= Party Secretary of Guangxi =

Regional government position in China

Secretary of the Guangxi Zhuang Autonomous Regional Committee of the Chinese Communist Party
- 中国共产党广西壮族自治区委员会书记
- Emblem of the Chinese Communist Party

- Flag of the Chinese Communist Party

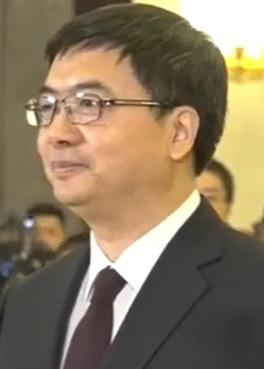
- Incumbent; Chen Gang since 31 December 2024
- Guangxi Zhuang Autonomous Regional Committee of the Chinese Communist Party
- Type: Party Committee Secretary
- Status: Provincial and ministerial-level official
- Member of: Guangxi Zhuang Autonomous Regional Standing Committee
- Nominator: Central Committee
- Appointer: Guangxi Zhuang Autonomous Regional Committee; Central Committee
- Inaugural holder: Zhang Yunyi
- Formation: 22 September 1949
- Deputy: Deputy Secretary; Secretary-General

The secretary of the Guangxi Zhuang Autonomous Regional Committee of the Chinese Communist Party is the leader of the Guangxi Zhuang Autonomous Regional Committee of the Chinese Communist Party (CCP). As the CCP is the sole ruling party of the People's Republic of China (PRC), the secretary is the highest ranking post in Guangxi.

The secretary is officially appointed by the CCP Central Committee based on the recommendation of the CCP Organization Department, which is then approved by the Politburo and its Standing Committee. The secretary can be also appointed by a plenary meeting of the Guangxi Regional Committee, but the candidate must be the same as the one approved by the central government. The secretary leads the Standing Committee of the Guangxi Regional Committee, and is usually a member of the CCP Central Committee. The secretary leads the work of the Regional Committee and its Standing Committee. The secretary is outranks the chairman, who is generally the deputy secretary of the committee.

The current secretary is Chen Gang, who took office on 31 December 2024.

== List of party secretaries ==
No.	Portrait	Name	Term start	Term end	Ref.
1		Zhang Yunyi (张云逸) (1892–1974)	22 September 1949	June 1956	
2		Chen Manyuan (陈漫远) (1911–1986)	June 1956	June 1957	
3		Liu Jianxun (刘建勋) (1913–1983)	June 1957	July 1961	
4		Wei Guoqing (韦国清) (1913–1989)	July 1961	October 1975	
5		An Pingsheng (安平生) (1917–1999)	October 1975	February 1977	
6		Qiao Xiaoguang (乔晓光) (1918–2003)	February 1977	June 1985	
7		Chen Huiguang (陈辉光) (born 1938)	June 1985	October 1990	
8		Zhao Fulin (赵富林) (1932-2024)	October 1990	July 1997	
9		Cao Bochun (曹伯纯) (born 1941)	July 1997	June 2006	
10		Liu Qibao (刘奇葆) (born 1953)	June 2006	November 2007	
11		Guo Shengkun (郭声琨) (born 1954)	November 2007	19 September 2012	
12		Peng Qinghua (彭清华) (born 1957)	19 September 2012	21 March 2018	
13		Lu Xinshe (鹿心社) (born 1956)	21 March 2018	18 October 2021	
14		Liu Ning (刘宁) (born 1962)	18 October 2021	31 December 2024	
15		Chen Gang (陈刚) (born 1965)	31 December 2024	Incumbent	
