= Chen Huiguang =

Chinese politician

- 陈辉光

Chairman of the Guangxi Regional Committee of the Chinese People's Political Consultative Conference
- In office 1988–2003
- Preceded by: Qin Yingji
- Succeeded by: Ma Qingsheng

Party Secretary of Guangxi
- In office June 1985 – October 1988
- Preceded by: Qiao Xiaoguang
- Succeeded by: Zhao Fulin

Party Secretary of Nanning
- In office 1983–1985
- Preceded by: Wang Enhou
- Succeeded by: Zhao Yisheng

Personal details
- Born: November 1938 (age 87) Yulin, Guangxi, China
- Party: Chinese Communist Party
- Education: Jiangxi Coal Mining Institute; Central Party School of the Chinese Communist Party

Chinese name
- Simplified Chinese: 陈辉光
- Traditional Chinese: 陳輝光
Transcriptions
Standard Mandarin
- Hanyu Pinyin: Chén Huīguāng

Chen Huiguang (Chinese: 陈辉光; born November 1938) is a Chinese politician who served as party secretary of Guangxi from 1985 to 1990 and chairman of the Guangxi Regional Committee of the Chinese People's Political Consultative Conference from 1988 to 2003.

He was a member of the 12th and 13th Central Committee of the Chinese Communist Party. He was a representative of the 14th and 15th National Congress of the Chinese Communist Party. He was a member of the 8th and 9th National Committee of the Chinese People's Political Consultative Conference. He was a member of the Standing Committee of the 10th Chinese People's Political Consultative Conference.

== Early life and education ==
Chen was born in Yulin, Guangxi, in November 1938. In 1961 he graduated from the Mining Department of Jiangxi Coal Mine College. He joined the Chinese Communist Party (CCP) in December 1965.

== Career ==
Starting in 1961, he served in several posts in the Dongluo Mining Bureau of Guangxi Zhuang Autonomous Region, including technician, secretary, engineer, and deputy party secretary and director.

He was deputy director of the Coal Bureau of Guangxi Zhuang Autonomous Region in November 1980 and subsequently deputy secretary of Guangxi, director of the Guangxi Autonomous Region Economic Commission and party secretary of Nanning. In June 1985, he was appointed party secretary of Guangxi, he remained in that position until 1988, when he was made chairman of the Guangxi Regional Committee of the Chinese People's Political Consultative Conference.

Party political offices
Preceded by Wang Enhou	Party Secretary of Nanning; 1983–1985	Succeeded by Zhao Yisheng
Preceded by Qiao Xiaoguang	Party Secretary of Guangxi; 1985–1988	Succeeded by Zhao Fulin
Assembly seats
Preceded by Qin Yingji	Chairman of the Guangxi Regional Committee of the Chinese People's Political Consultative Conference; 1988–2003	Succeeded by Ma Qingsheng
