= Zhao Fulin =

Chinese politician (1932–2024)

- 赵富林

Party Secretary of Guangxi
- In office October 1990 – July 1997
- Deputy: Cheng Kejie (governor)
- Preceded by: Chen Huiguang
- Succeeded by: Cao Bochun

Chairman of Guangxi People's Congress
- In office January 1995 – January 2002
- Preceded by: Liu Mingzu
- Succeeded by: Cao Bochun

Personal details
- Born: July 1932 Daming County, Hebei, China
- Died: 28 October 2024 (aged 92) Nanning, Guangxi, China
- Party: Chinese Communist Party
- Education: South Hebei Military and Political Cadre School; Central Party School of the Chinese Communist Party

Chinese name
- Simplified Chinese: 赵富林
- Traditional Chinese: 趙富林
Transcriptions
Standard Mandarin
- Hanyu Pinyin: Zhào Fùlín

Zhao Fulin (Chinese: 赵富林; July 1932 – 28 October 2024) was a Chinese politician who served as party secretary of Guangxi from 1990 to 1997 and chairman of Guangxi People's Congress from 1995 to 2002.

Zhao was a member of the 13th and 14th Central Committee of the Chinese Communist Party.

== Biography ==
Zhao was born in Daming County, Hebei in July 1932. He graduated from South Hebei Military and Political Cadre School and the Central Party School of the Chinese Communist Party.

From May 1949 to September 1961, he worked in Guanghua County (now part of Xiangyang and Laohekou), Zaoyang County (now Zaoyang), and then Jingmen County. He was appointed deputy party secretary of Jingzhou in August 1966, concurrently serving as party secretary of Jiangling County. In October 1983, he was elevated to party secretary of Jingzhou, the top political position in the city. He was appointed deputy party secretary of Hubei in December 1985, in addition to serving as secretary of the Discipline Inspection Commission.

In October 1990, he was transferred to southwest China's Guangxi Zhuang Autonomous Region and appointed party secretary. He also served as chairman of Guangxi People's Congress between January 1995 and January 2002.

Zhao died on 28 October 2024, at the age of 92.

Party political offices
Preceded by Hu Hengshan	Secretary of Hubei Discipline Inspection Commission of the Chinese Communist Party; 1985–1987	Succeeded by Ding Fengying
Preceded by Chen Huiguang	Party Secretary of Guangxi; 1990–1997	Succeeded by Cao Bochun
Assembly seats
Preceded by Liu Mingzu	Chairman of Guangxi People's Congress; 1995–2002	Succeeded by Cao Bochun
