= Wei Guoqing =

Chinese general and politician (1913–1989)

- 韦国清
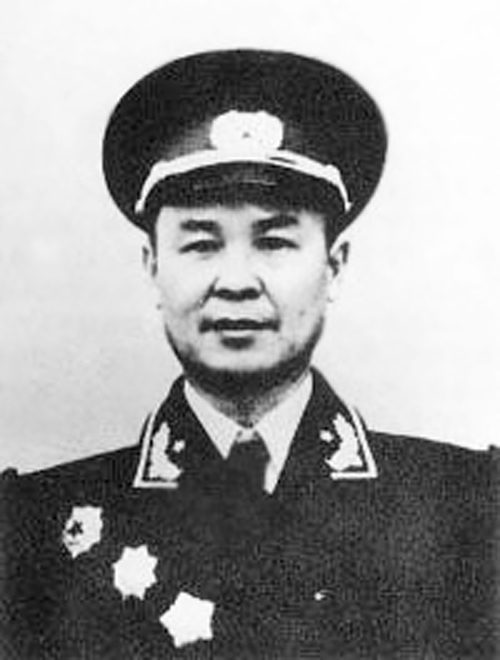
- Wei in 1955

Director of the People's Liberation Army General Political Department
- In office August 1977 – September 1982
- Preceded by: Zhang Chunqiao
- Succeeded by: Yu Qiuli

Party Secretary of Guangdong
- In office October 1975 – January 1979
- Governor: Himself
- Preceded by: Zhao Ziyang
- Succeeded by: Xi Zhongxun

Vice Chairman of the Standing Committee of the National People's Congress
- In office 17 January 1975 – 14 June 1989
- Chairperson: Zhu De→Song Qingling→Ye Jianying→Peng Zhen→Wan Li

Party Secretary of Guangxi
- In office January 1967 – October 1975
- Governor: Himself
- Preceded by: Qiao Xiaoguang
- Succeeded by: An Pingsheng
- In office July 1961 – April 1966
- Preceded by: Liu Jianxun
- Succeeded by: Qiao Xiaoguang
- In office August 1955 – June 1956
- Preceded by: Zhang Yunyi
- Succeeded by: Chen Manyuan

Vice Chairman of the Chinese People's Political Consultative Conference
- In office 5 January 1965 – 17 June 1983
- Chairperson: Zhou Enlai→Deng Xiaoping

Political Commissar of the Guangzhou Military Region
- In office November 1966 – August 1977
- Preceded by: Tao Zhu
- Succeeded by: Xiang Zhonghua

Personal details
- Born: Wei Bangkuan; 2 September 1913 Donglan County, Guangxi, China
- Died: 14 June 1989 (aged 75) Beijing, China
- Party: Chinese Communist Party
- Spouse(s): Liang Zhengxiang; Xu Qiqian
- Children: 5
- Education: Counter-Japanese Military and Political University

Military service
- Allegiance: People's Republic of China
- Years of service: 1929–1982
- Rank: General
- Battles/wars: Second Sino-Japanese War; Chinese Civil War; First Indochina War

Chinese name
- Simplified Chinese: 韦国清
- Traditional Chinese: 韋國清
Transcriptions
Standard Mandarin
- Hanyu Pinyin: Wéi Guóqīng
Yue: Cantonese
- Jyutping: Wai5 Gwok3-cing1

Wei Bangkuan
- Simplified Chinese: 韦邦宽
- Traditional Chinese: 韋邦寬
Transcriptions
Standard Mandarin
- Hanyu Pinyin: Wéi Bāngkuān
Yue: Cantonese
- Jyutping: Wai5 Bong1-fun1

Zhuang name
- Zhuang: Veiz Gozcing

Wei Guoqing (Chinese: 韦国清; pinyin: Wéi Guóqīng; Zhuang: Veiz Gozcing; 2 September 1913 – 14 June 1989) was a Chinese military officer and politician of Zhuang ethnicity. A veteran of the Long March, he commanded units of the New Fourth Army and the East China Field Army and was made a general in 1955. He led the Chinese Military Advisory Group that assisted the Viet Minh against France, and he then governed Guangxi for about two decades. He later served as director of the General Political Department of the People's Liberation Army from 1977 to 1982 and as a member of the Politburo, and he was a vice chairman of the Standing Committee of the National People's Congress from 1975 until his death.

During the Cultural Revolution, Wei kept control of Guangxi with the backing of most military units and much of the militia, and in 1968, the central leadership endorsed his suppression of the opposing "April 22" faction. Tens of thousands of people were killed in Guangxi that year in what is known as the Guangxi Massacre, and scholars and critics have linked his policies to the killings, which included cases of cannibalism. He lost his army post in 1982 after a clash with Deng Xiaoping's reformist leadership.

== Early life ==
Wei was born Wei Bangkuan on 2 September 1913 in Donglan County, Guangxi, into a poor Zhuang peasant family. In the summer of 1928, he joined the peasant self-defence force led by Wei Baqun and took part in an attack on the Donglan county seat. In 1929, he joined the Communist Youth League, and in December that year, he took part in the Baise Uprising, after which he was assigned to the 7th Army of the Chinese Red Army. In 1930, he served as a platoon leader in the 56th Regiment of the 7th Army's 19th Division, and later in its 55th Regiment, and from November 1930, he took part in the army's march through the border regions of Guangxi, Guizhou, Hunan and Jiangxi. He joined the Chinese Communist Party (CCP) in February 1931, and in July, he moved with his unit into the Central Soviet Area, where he served as a company commander and fought in the third campaign against the Nationalist encirclements.

== Red Army and Long March ==
In 1932, Wei studied military engineering at the Workers' and Peasants' Red Army School in Ruijin, after which he served as a company commander and military instructor. In early 1934, he entered the senior command course of the Red Army University, and after graduating, he became secretary of its party branch. When the Long March began in October 1934, he commanded the 4th Battalion of the Central Red Army's cadre regiment, a special-arms unit with artillery, engineers, heavy machine guns and mortars, whose political commissar was Huang Jinshan. In 1935, his unit built a pontoon bridge across the Wu River, seized the Jiaoping crossing on the Jinsha River and raided Tong'anzhou. After the First and Fourth Front Armies met in June 1935, he became acting commander of the Red Army University's special regiment, and in January 1937, he became commander of the special regiment of the Red Army's training division.

== Second Sino-Japanese War ==
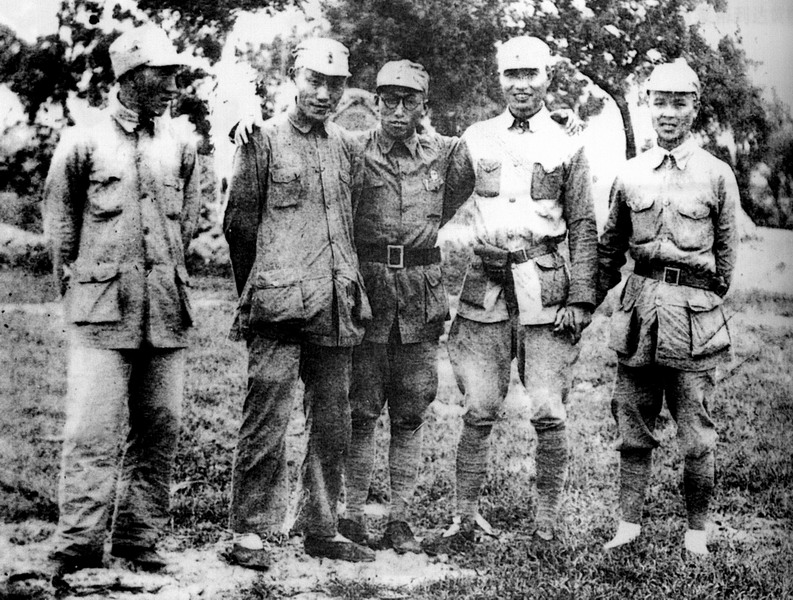
Commanders of the Eighth Route Army's 5th Column in northeastern Anhui on 25 August 1940. From left: Han Zhenji, Liu Ruilong, Tian Shouyao, Zhang Aiping and Wei Guoqing

After the outbreak of the Second Sino-Japanese War, Wei became head of the school attached to the headquarters of the Eighth Route Army and led its staff and students to the front in Shanxi. In May 1938, he became commander of the 6th Brigade of the Anti-Japanese Military and Political University, and in December that year, he led part of its staff and students across the Yellow River to the Taihang Mountains, where he helped found its First Branch and served as its head of training and deputy principal.

In January 1940, Wei marched south with Huang Kecheng's 5th Column. That year, he served as political commissar of the Eighth Route Army's Longhai southern advance detachment and then of the 3rd Detachment of its 5th Column, helping to establish a base area in northern Jiangsu. After the New Fourth Army incident of January 1941, he became political commissar of the 9th Brigade of the New Fourth Army's 3rd Division. In November 1941, the brigade was placed under the 4th Division, and Wei, now its commander, led it west from the Huaihai area back to northeastern Anhui. In 1942, he also became commander of the 1st Military Sub-district of the Huaibei Military District, secretary of the CCP's Huaibei 1st Prefectural Committee and chief of staff of the military district. In March 1943, his brigade led the main attack in the battle of Shanzitou against the forces of the Nationalist governor of Jiangsu Han Deqin. In September 1944, he became deputy commander of the New Fourth Army's 4th Division, and after the division commander Peng Xuefeng was killed, he set up a field headquarters to direct the division's westward campaign, which restored its base area in Henan, Anhui and Jiangsu. In 1945, he helped the division commander Zhang Aiping capture several county towns, including Siyang, Suining and Xiaoxian.

== Chinese Civil War ==
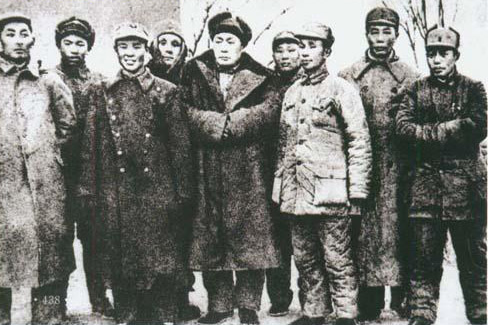
A group photo of leaders of the East China Field Army of China in 1947. From left: Ye Fei, Ding Qiusheng, Wei Guoqing, Deng Zihui, Chen Yi, Tang Liang, Su Yu, Chen Shigui, and Tan Zhenlin.

After the Japanese surrender, Wei became deputy commander of the New Fourth Army's 2nd Column and the chief communist representative on the Xuzhou team of the military mediation headquarters in Beiping. He later commanded the 2nd Column of the Shandong Field Army, and in 1946, he directed its main attack in the battle of Chaoyangji, in which the Nationalist 92nd Brigade was destroyed. He then served as commander and political commissar of the 2nd Column of the East China Field Army. In February 1947, he directed the battle of Baitabu, in which his forces destroyed the main force of the Nationalist 42nd Group Army and captured its commander Hao Pengju. During the Menglianggu campaign in May 1947, his column blocked the Nationalist 7th Army and Reorganised 83rd Division southwest of Yishui, holding off repeated attacks for three days and nights and enabling the main force to destroy the Nationalist Reorganised 74th Division. In July 1947, he took part in the Nanma and Linqu campaigns, and from August, he fought on the Jiaodong Peninsula.

In early 1948, Wei led the 2nd Column south and became commander of the Northern Jiangsu Corps. In March, he attacked Yilin and destroyed the Nationalist 113th Brigade, and in June, he launched an offensive on the eastern section of the Longhai railway in support of the Eastern Henan Campaign. During the Huaihai Campaign, his 2nd Column made a forced march to cut off the retreat of Du Yuming's forces towards Yongcheng. According to the historians William Whitson and Huang Chen-hsia, he held off the Nationalist 2nd Army of Qiu Qingquan and about 100 tanks under Chiang Wei-kuo in a decisive delaying action. In February 1949, he became political commissar of the 10th Corps of the Third Field Army, and in April, he took part in the Yangtze River Crossing campaign. After the capture of Shanghai, he and the corps commander Ye Fei led their forces into Fujian and launched the Fuzhou campaign, and in August 1949, he became director of the Fuzhou Military Control Commission, CCP secretary of Fuzhou and the city's mayor.

== Vietnam ==
In April 1950, Liu Shaoqi chose Wei to head the Chinese Military Advisory Group, which was to help Ho Chi Minh's forces fight the French, and Wei also served as secretary of its party committee. Before he left, Mao Zedong told him that the group should support the Vietnamese revolution as sincerely as it had served the Chinese revolution. The group, made up of 281 officers, was formally established in Nanning in July 1950 and arrived in North Vietnam in August under Wei's leadership. Together with Chen Geng, the CCP Central Committee's representative, Wei proposed and helped direct the Border Campaign of 1950.

In July 1951, Wei returned to China to become deputy commander of the Public Security Force, and in October 1952, he went back to Vietnam, where he took part in directing the Northwest Campaign. In October 1953, he reportedly gave Ho Chi Minh a copy of the French Navarre Plan. In 1954, though ill, he helped direct the Battle of Dien Bien Phu. During the Geneva Conference, he attended talks in Liuzhou between Zhou Enlai, Ho Chi Minh and Võ Nguyên Giáp in early July 1954, at which he gave a supplementary presentation. On 15 July, Zhou instructed him to propose to the Vietnamese side that they quickly draw up a plan for withdrawing their forces from the south.

== Guangxi ==
=== Before the Cultural Revolution ===
In 1954, Wei was elected a deputy to the 1st National People's Congress, and in September, he attended its first session, which discussed the draft of the state constitution. In February 1955, he was elected governor of Guangxi, in July, he became second deputy commander of the Public Security Force, and in August, he became first deputy secretary of the provincial party committee. He took up his post in Guangxi on his return to China in 1956. In 1955, he was made a general when the People's Liberation Army introduced formal ranks, and in 1956, he became an alternate member of the 8th Central Committee, becoming a full member in 1966. In July 1957, the National People's Congress resolved to turn the province into the Guangxi Zhuang Autonomous Region, a change intended to give the Zhuang cultural autonomy. In January 1958, he hosted the Nanning Conference, which was attended by Mao and most of the top leadership. Although Wei was junior to the other participants, he was present at one of the decisive discussions of the Great Leap Forward, at which production targets were approved. The autonomous region was proclaimed on 5 March 1958, and that month, Wei became the first chairman of its government. That year, he also became the first president of the re-established Guangxi University. He became second secretary of the regional party committee in October 1959 and first secretary in July 1961.

In 1962, Wei was elected chairman of the Guangxi committee of the Chinese People's Political Consultative Conference, and he became first political commissar of the Guangxi Military District in 1964 and of the Guangzhou Military Region in 1966. In 1965, Beihai, Qinzhou and other coastal areas on the Gulf of Tonkin were transferred from Guangdong to Guangxi's administration. The transfer gave Guangxi a coastline, making it the only one of China's five autonomous regions with access to the sea. Guangxi, together with Yunnan, was the route by which Chinese troops entered Vietnam between 1965 and 1970. His official biography credits him with substantial growth in Guangxi's agriculture, industry, water conservancy, defence, culture and education during his 20 years in charge of the region.

=== Cultural Revolution ===
Unlike most provincial party leaders, Wei was not toppled at the start of the Cultural Revolution. The historian Song Yongyi noted that he was the only provincial party first secretary and first political commissar of a military district in China who was neither overthrown nor transferred during the Cultural Revolution. Rebels and Red Guards hounded him and paraded him through the streets of Guilin in a dunce cap, but within a few months he regained power with the backing of most military units and much of the militia. In March 1967, he became head of the Guangxi Military Control Committee, which controlled the People's Armed Departments that trained the militias. On 22 April 1967, his political rival Wu Jinnan mobilised Red Guards in an attempt to overthrow him, and the region's mass organisations split into the "April 22" faction and the Allied Command, which supported Wei. Wei was strongly disliked by many members of the Central Cultural Revolution Group, who backed the opposition against him, but Mao was unwilling to have him purged because of the war in Vietnam and Wei's past role as an adviser to the Vietnamese communists.

Late in 1967, Wei and Wu were summoned to Beijing to negotiate a settlement. In a decision on Guangxi issued on 18 November 1967, the Central Committee stated that Wei had sincerely examined his errors with a good attitude, and it approved his self-criticism. After the two men returned to Guangxi, Wei sent loyal militia to strategic counties, and in the spring of 1968, the Allied Command used heavy weapons against opponents whom it labelled counter-revolutionaries. On 17 June 1968, the region's revolutionary committee preparatory group and the Guangxi Military District announced that they had uncovered a counter-revolutionary group called the "Guangxi branch of the Republic of China Anti-Communist National Salvation Army".

On 3 July 1968, the Central Committee, the State Council, the Central Military Commission and the Central Cultural Revolution Group issued a notice based on a report by the preparatory group and the Guangxi Military District, which ordered an immediate end to armed fighting and called for the punishment of "active counter-revolutionaries". According to Sutton, Beijing had sided decisively with Wei, who was photographed with Mao the same day, and Wei then steadily established his authority over the counties. The historians Roderick MacFarquhar and Michael Schoenhals wrote that Wei's attack on the April 22 faction in 1968 led to large-scale bloodshed. On 26 August 1968, the Guangxi Revolutionary Committee was founded with Wei as its chairman. The writer Liu Binyan stated that Wei had obtained an order from the Central Cultural Revolution Group to suppress the April 22 faction and had then lent his army to the effort.

Using the records of investigations carried out in the 1980s, the sociologist Andrew G. Walder found that almost 90,000 people were killed in Guangxi and about 10,000 more went missing in what became known as the Guangxi Massacre, mostly during a campaign in the countryside in the summer of 1968. Walder argued that the killings were part of a region-wide counterinsurgency campaign against rebel insurgents, carried out by village militias that also killed many noncombatants. The historian Donald S. Sutton argued that Wei's uncompromising policies, including reported orders for peasants to kill fleeing rebels with hoes, together with the bitterness of the long conflict, directly produced the widespread violence of the summer of 1968, including the cannibalism in Wuxuan County. Song Yongyi found that 49,272 of the deaths, or 58.3 per cent of the total, occurred after the notice of 3 July, and he argued that Wei directly instigated the massacres. In 1969, Wei became a member of the Central Military Commission, and in February 1971, he became first secretary of the reconstituted Guangxi party committee.

== Guangdong and central leadership ==
In October 1975, Wei was transferred to Guangdong, where he became first secretary of the provincial party committee and first political commissar of the Guangzhou Military Region, and he later also became chairman of the Guangdong Revolutionary Committee. In August 1977, he became director of the People's Liberation Army's General Political Department and a standing member of the Central Military Commission, and in February 1979, he became the commission's deputy secretary-general. He was a member of the 9th to 12th Central Committees and of the 10th to 12th Politburos, and earlier he had been a member of the Standing Committee of the 1st National People's Congress and of the 1st to 3rd National Defence Councils. In April 1981, the Liberation Army Daily, the armed forces' newspaper, published a full-page attack on the film Bitter Love, written by the army writer Bai Hua.

In August 1982, the Liberation Army Daily, which was under Wei's authority, published an article against "bourgeois liberalization" that was seen as an attack on Deng Xiaoping's policies shortly before the 12th Party Congress, and Wei was dismissed and replaced by Yu Qiuli. When Yu's appointment was reported in September 1982, The Christian Science Monitor described Wei as widely regarded as holding views somewhat to the left of the moderates who dominated the leadership. Liu Binyan later wrote that Wei had been one of Deng's favourite followers during the revolutionary struggles, but that he continued to insist on the correctness of the Cultural Revolution while Deng sought to discredit it, which led to a split between them. By July 1983, Wei had no formal links with Guangxi, and his seat in the National People's Congress had been moved from Guangxi to Henan.

According to Liu, Wei's removal cleared the way for the central authorities to send investigators to Guangxi. In the early 1980s, the central leadership under Hu Yaobang ousted Guangxi's local leadership, which had tried to stall the investigations. Yan Lebin, an official who took part in handling the legacy of the Cultural Revolution in Guangxi, recalled that Wei had privately told He Lanjie, a vice president of the Supreme People's Court, that 150,000 people had died in Guangxi during the Cultural Revolution. Yan also wrote that by the 1980s, Guangxi had added a third principle to the "Two Whatevers", that whatever Comrade Wei Guoqing had instructed must be resolutely carried out. According to the political scientist Feng Chongyi, Wei was not classed among the "three kinds of people" targeted after the Cultural Revolution because of his revolutionary record before 1949. On 16 September 1985, the Central Committee agreed to requests by 64 veteran members, including Wei, to leave the Central Committee. He remained a vice chairman of the Standing Committee of the National People's Congress, a post he had held since 1975, and he had been a vice chairman of the national committee of the Chinese People's Political Consultative Conference from 1964 to 1983.

== Death and legacy ==
Wei died in Beijing on 14 June 1989. His ashes were kept at the Babaoshan columbarium until 24 October 2024, when they were reburied at the Babaoshan Revolutionary Cemetery in a ceremony attended by his widow, his son and descendants of other revolutionary leaders, including Zhu De and Peng Dehuai.

In May 2024, the head of the General Political Department of the People's Army of Vietnam received Wei's son in Hanoi, and the Vietnamese army newspaper described Wei as the head of the Chinese military advisers in the Dien Bien Phu campaign and named him among the Chinese advisers whose help had been one of the important factors in Vietnam's revolutionary success.

== Personal life ==
Wei's first wife, Liang Zhengxiang, was from Liuzhou and had come to Yan'an to study at the Anti-Japanese Military and Political University. Guo Huaruo introduced her to Wei in Yan'an in 1938, and after she graduated from the university's 4th Brigade in November that year, they married at Luochuan. Their son Wei Yunfeng was born in 1939 in the Taihang Mountains. The war kept the family apart until early 1942, when Liang brought their son to Wei at the New Fourth Army's 9th Brigade. Because his parents were away on revolutionary work, Wei Yunfeng was raised by a Red Army veteran. In 1958, he entered the Harbin Military Engineering Institute as one of its first students of missile automatic control. After graduating in 1964, he worked for the National Defense Science and Technology Commission, and from 1975, he was an engineer at the First Research Institute of the Ministry of Public Security, where he worked on security systems for sites including the Great Hall of the People and the Mausoleum of Mao Zedong. He retired because of illness in 1997 and died on 28 December 2014, aged 76.

Wei later married Xu Qiqian. While Wei led the advisory group in Vietnam, Xu worked in Beijing, where their son Wei Xiaoyi and his elder brothers lived with her. She later moved with the children to Guangxi, where she worked in the education bureau. Wei Xiaoyi, who was born after 1949, served in the news department of the People's Liberation Army's General Staff and later researched Chinese military and revolutionary history.

== Awards and honors ==
Order of August 1 (2nd Class Medal) (1955)
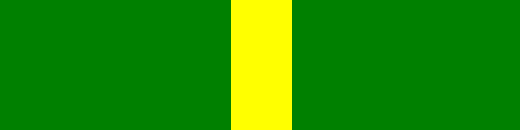
Order of Independence and Freedom (1st Class Medal) (1955)
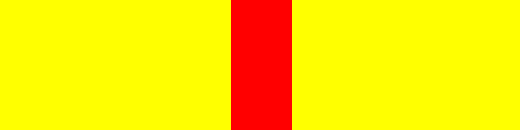
Order of Liberation (1st Class Medal) (1955)
Red Star Medal of Merit (1st Class Medal) (1988)

== See also ==
- Guangxi Massacre

Government offices
New title	Mayor of Fuzhou; 1949–1950	Succeeded by Xu Ya
Preceded by Chen Manyuan (acting)	Governor of Guangxi; 1955–1956	Succeeded by An Pingsheng
Preceded by Zhao Ziyang	Governor of Guangdong; 1975–1979	Succeeded by Xi Zhongxun
Party political offices
New title	Party Secretary of Fuzhou; 1949–1950	Succeeded by Xu Jiatun
Preceded by Zhang Yunyi	Party Secretary of Guangxi; 1955–1956	Succeeded by Chen Manyuan
Preceded by Liu Jianxun	Party Secretary of Guangxi; 1961–1966	Succeeded by Qiao Xiaoguang
Preceded by Qiao Xiaoguang	Party Secretary of Guangxi; 1967–1975	Succeeded by An Pingsheng
Preceded by Zhao Ziyang	Party Secretary of Guangdong; 1975–1978	Succeeded by Xi Zhongxun
Educational offices
Preceded by Yang Dongchun	President of Guangxi University; 1958–1968	Succeeded by Li Yanhuai
Assembly seats
Preceded by Liu Jianxun	Chairman of the Guangxi Regional Committee of the Chinese People's Political Consultative Conference; 1962–1977	Succeeded by Qin Yingji
Military offices
Preceded by Tao Zhu	Political Commissar of the Guangzhou Military Region; 1966–1977	Succeeded by Xiang Zhonghua
Preceded by Zhang Chunqiao	Director of the People's Liberation Army General Political Department; 1977–1982	Succeeded by Yu Qiuli
