= Wen Minsheng =

Chinese politician

Wen Minsheng (Chinese: 文敏生) (1915–1997) was CPC Committee Secretary and Governor of Henan. He was born in Shanxi.

Preceded by Liu Jianxun	Communist Party Chief of Henan	Succeeded by Liu Jianxun
Preceded by Wu Zhipu	Governor of Henan	Succeeded by Liu Jianxun
