= Hengxian Middle School =

School in Guangxi, China

- Other names: 横县中学
- Former names: 横县县立中学、郭公讲院、秀林书院
- Type: Public
- Established: 1923
- Administrative staff: 203
- Students: 3348

Hengxian Middle School is a public senior high school located in Heng county, Guangxi Autonomous Region, the People's Republic of China. It was formally established as a public secondary educational institution in 1923. As of 2010, it has 53 classes, 203 staff and faculty members, and 3348 students.
