= Guangxi =

Autonomous region of China

Coordinates: 23.6°N 108.3°E

Guangxi 广西 Kwangsi
- Autonomous region
- Guangxi Zhuang Autonomous Region

Chinese transcription(s)
  - Pinyin: Guǎngxī zhuàngzú zìzhìqū
  - Jyutping: Gwong2 sai1 Zong3 zuk6 Zi6 zi6 keoi1
  - Abbreviation: 桂 (Guì; Gwai3)

Zhuang transcription(s)
  - Standard Zhuang: Gvangjsih Bouxcuengh Swcigih
  - Abbreviation: Gvei
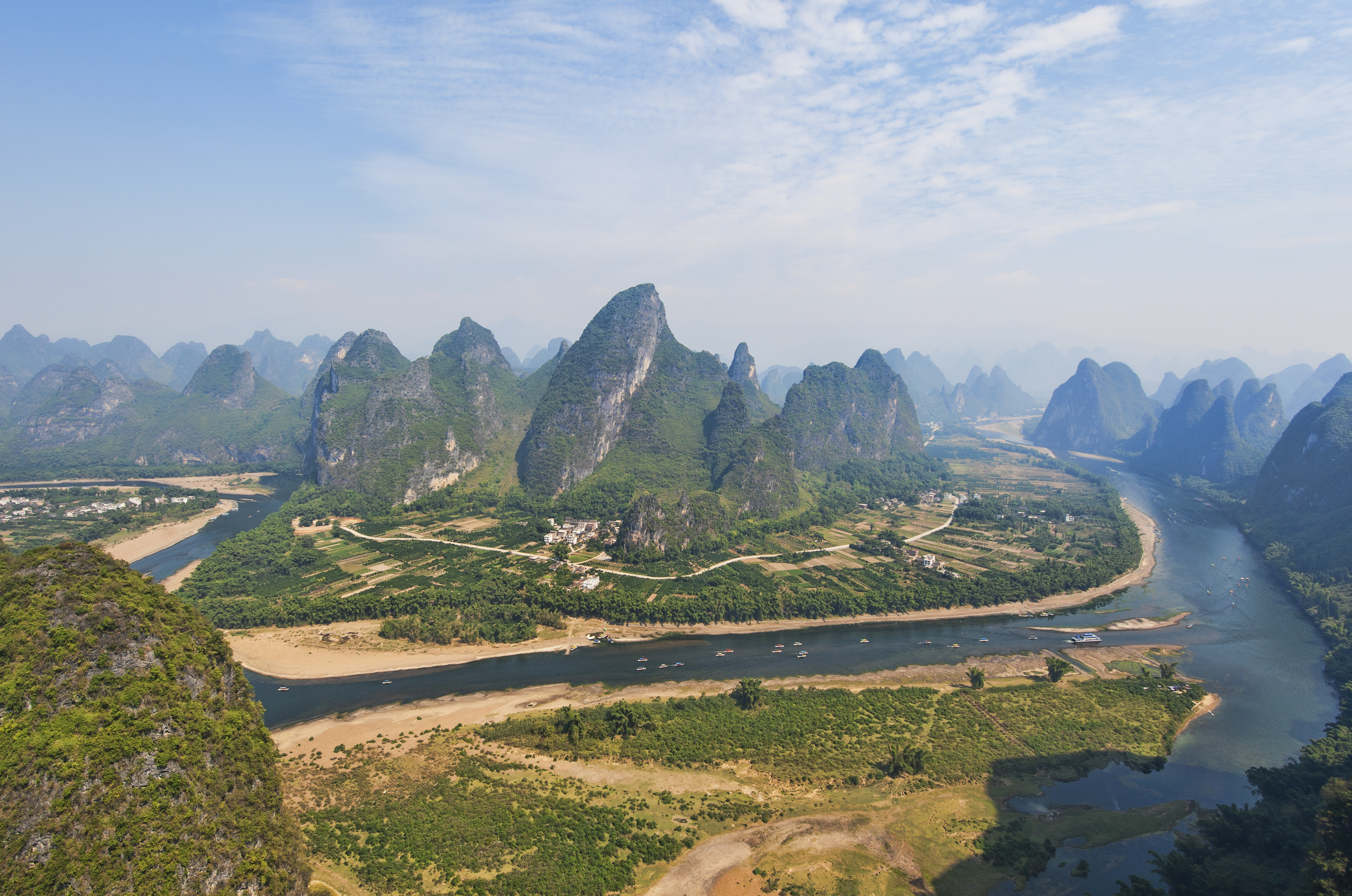
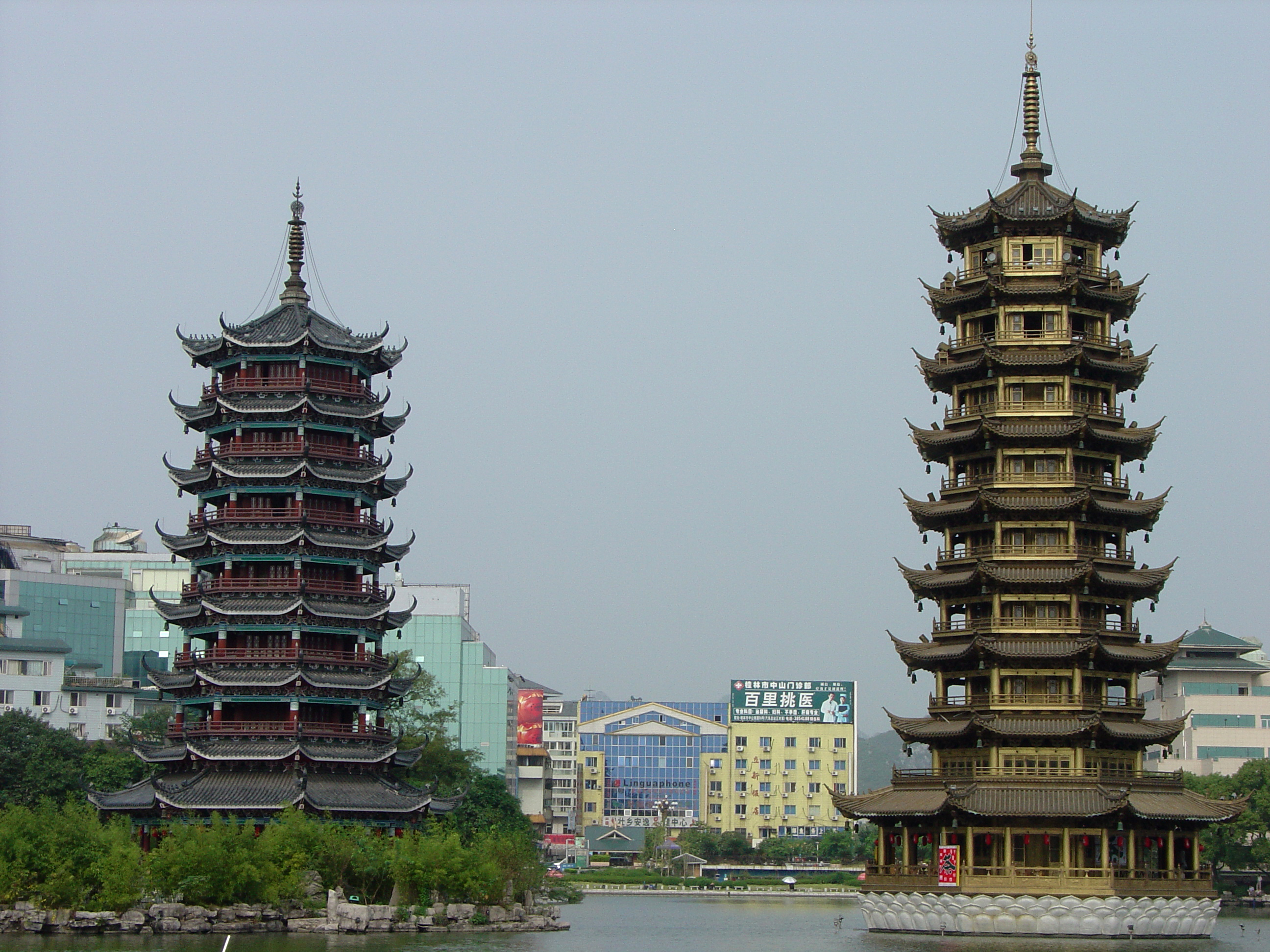
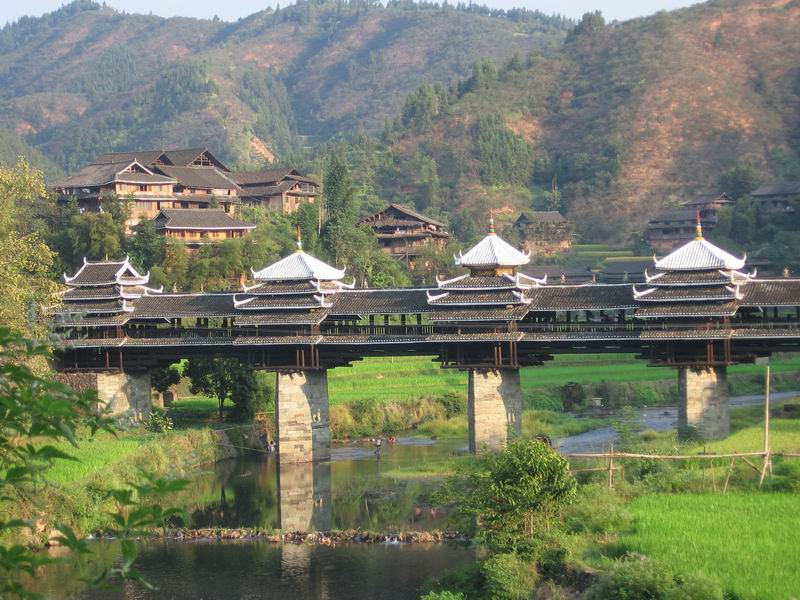
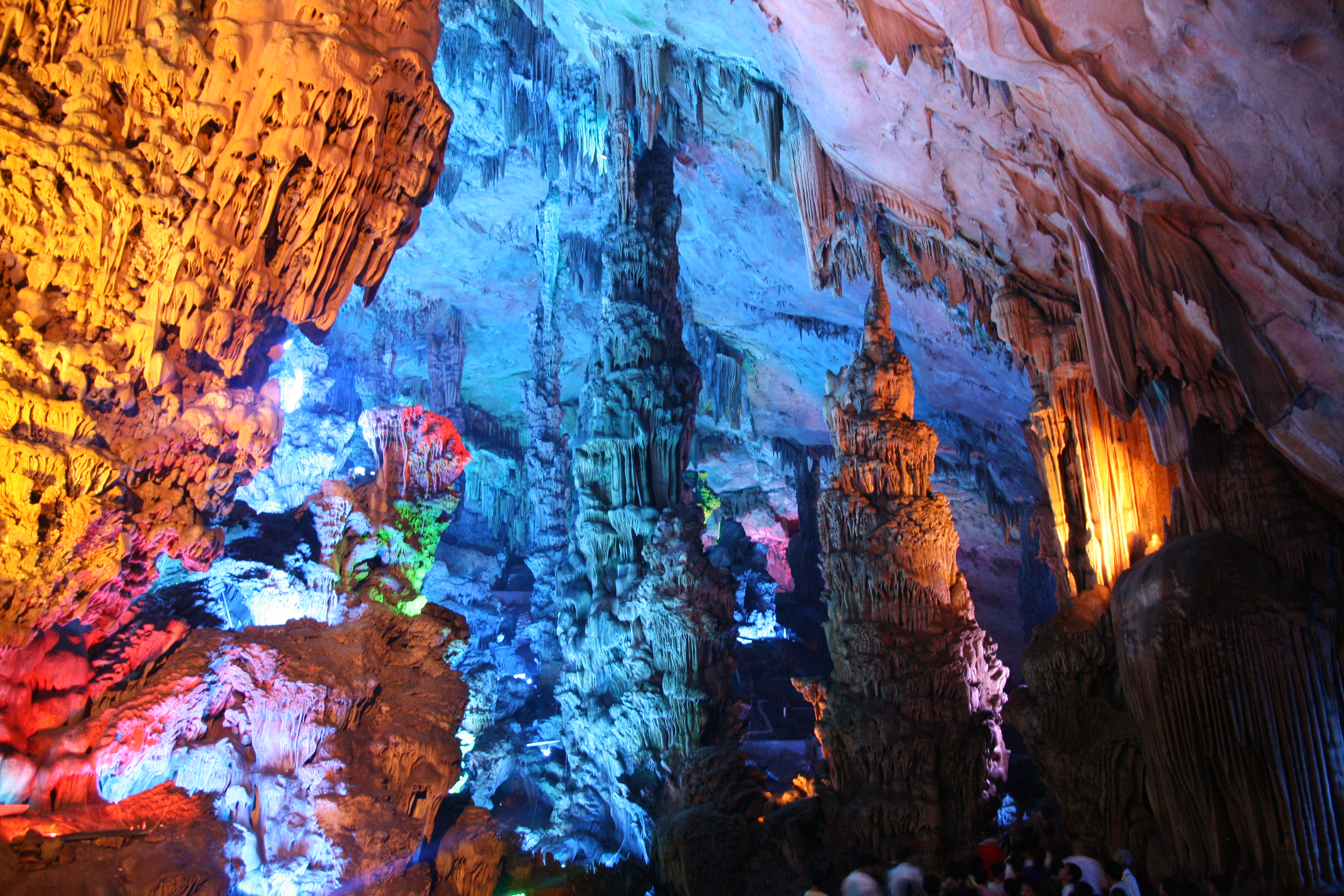
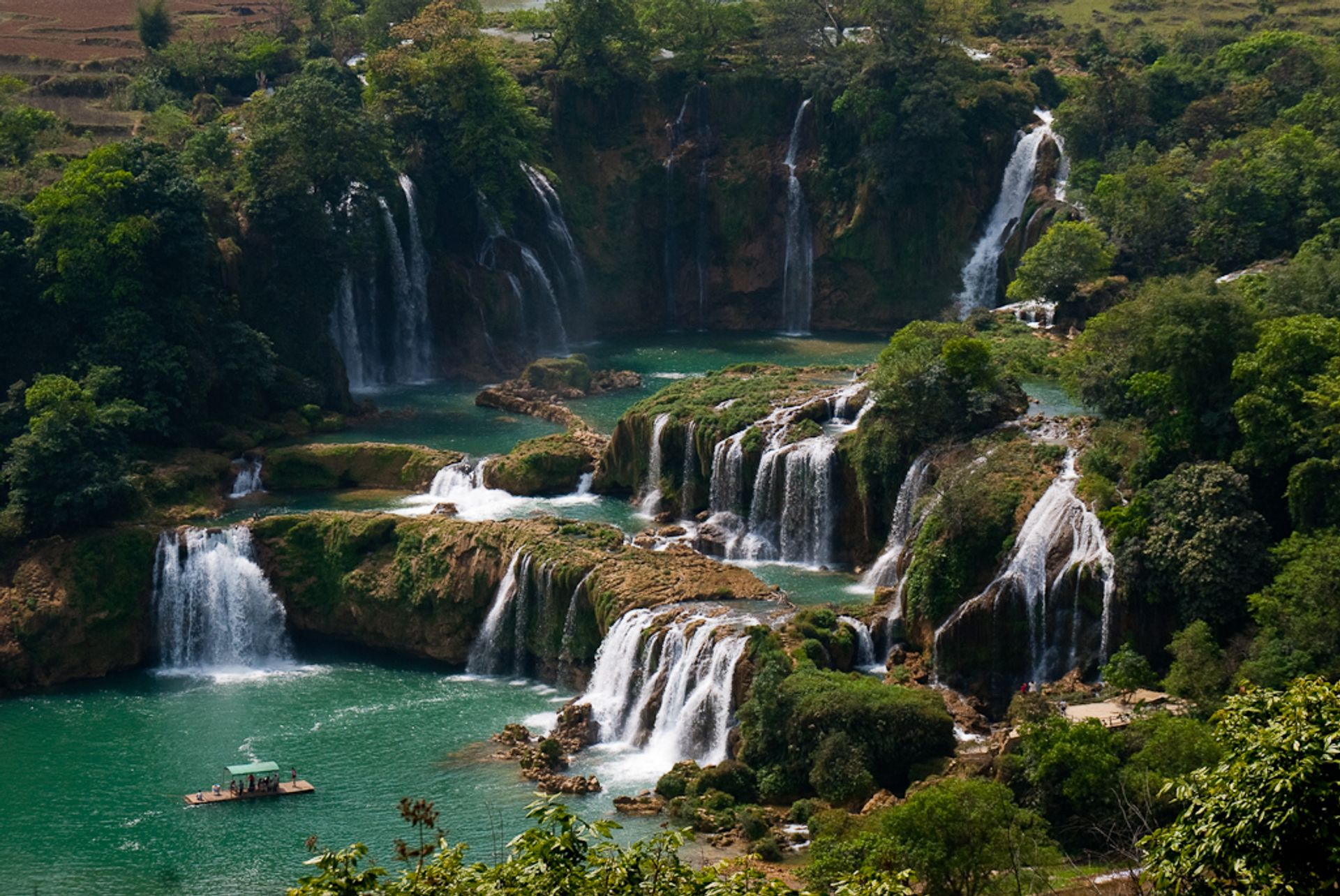
- Li River Sun and Moon Pagodas Chengyang Bridge Reed Flute Cave Detian Falls

- Location of Guangxi within China
- Country: China
- Named for: 广 guǎng – 'wide'; 西 xī – 'west'; lit. 'western expanse'
- Capital (and largest city): Nanning
- Divisions: 14 prefectures, 109 counties, 1396 townships

Government
  - Type: Autonomous region
  - Body: Guangxi Zhuang Autonomous Regional People's Congress
  - Party Secretary: Chen Gang
  - Congress Chairman: Chen Gang
  - Government Chairman: Wei Tao
  - CPPCC Chairman: Sun Dawei
  - National People's Congress Representation: 91 deputies

Area
  - Total: 237,600 km^{2} (91,700 sq mi)
  - Rank: 9th
- Highest elevation (Kitten Mountain): 2,141 m (7,024 ft)

Population (2020)
  - Total: 50,126,804
  - Rank: 11th
  - Density: 211.0/km^{2} (546.4/sq mi)
  - Rank: 20th

Demographics
  - Ethnic composition: Han – 62%; Zhuang – 31%; Yao – 3%; Miao – 1%; Dong – 0.7%; Mulao – 0.4%; Maonan – 0.2%
  - Languages and dialects: Zhuang, Yue languages (mainly Cantonese), Southwestern Mandarin, Pinghua
- ISO 3166 code: CN-GX
- GDP (2025): CN¥ 2,973 billion (19th); US$ 416 billion
- GDP per capita: CN¥59,384 (29th); US$8,314
- GDP growth: ▲4.1%
- HDI (2023): 0.760 (26th) – high
- Website: (in Chinese) Guangxi Zhuang Autonomous Region

Guangxi
- Guangxi in simplified (top) and traditional (bottom) characters

Chinese name
- Simplified Chinese: 广西
- Traditional Chinese: 廣西
- Hanyu Pinyin: Guǎngxī
Transcriptions
Standard Mandarin
- Hanyu Pinyin: Guǎngxī
- Bopomofo: ㄍㄨㄤˇ ㄒㄧ
- Gwoyeu Romatzyh: Goangshi
- Wade–Giles: Kuang^{3}-hsi^{1}
- Yale Romanization: Gwǎngsyī
- IPA: [kwàŋ.ɕí]
Wu
- Romanization: Kuaon^{上}si^{平}
Hakka
- Romanization: Kóng-sî
Yue: Cantonese
- Yale Romanization: Gwóngsāi
- Jyutping: Gwong2 sai1
- IPA: [kʷɔ̌ːŋ.sɐ́i]
Southern Min
- Hokkien POJ: Kńg-sai
- Teochew Peng'im: Kuáng-sai
Eastern Min
- Fuzhou BUC: Guōng-să̤

Guangxi Zhuang Autonomous Region
- Simplified Chinese: 广西壮族自治区
- Traditional Chinese: 廣西壯族自治區
- Hanyu Pinyin: Guǎngxī zhuàngzú zìzhìqū
Transcriptions
Standard Mandarin
- Hanyu Pinyin: Guǎngxī zhuàngzú zìzhìqū
- Bopomofo: ㄍㄨㄤˇ ㄒㄧ ㄓㄨㄤˋ ㄗㄨˊ ㄗˋ ㄓˋ ㄑㄩ
- Gwoyeu Romatzyh: Goangshi Juanqtzwu Tzyhjyhchiu
- Wade–Giles: Kuang^{3}-hsi^{1} Chuang^{4}-tsu^{2} Tzŭ^{4}-chih^{4}-chʻü^{1}
- Yale Romanization: Gwǎngsyī Jwàngdzú Dz̀jr̀chyū
- IPA: [kwàŋ.ɕí ʈʂwâŋ.tsǔ tsɹ̩̂.ʈʂɻ̩̂.tɕʰý]
Wu
- Romanization: Kuaon^{上}si^{平} tsaon^{去}zoh^{入} zy^{去}zy^{去}chiu^{平}
Hakka
- Romanization: Kóng-sî Tsong-tshu̍k Tshṳ-tshṳ-khî
Yue: Cantonese
- Yale Romanization: Gwóngsāi Jongjuhk Jihjihkēui
- Jyutping: Gwong2 sai1 Zong3 zuk6 Zi6 zi6 keoi1
- IPA: [kʷɔŋ˧˥.sɐj˥ tsɔŋ˧.tsʊk̚˨ tsi˨.tsi˨.kʰɵɥ˥]
Southern Min
- Hokkien POJ: Kńg-sai Chàng-cho̍k Chū-tī-khu
- Teochew Peng'im: Kuáng-sai Tsàng-tsôk Tsĕu-tī-khu
Eastern Min
- Fuzhou BUC: Guōng-să̤ Cáung-cŭk Cê̤ṳ-dê-kṳ̆

Vietnamese name
- Vietnamese alphabet: Quảng Tây
- Chữ Hán: 廣西
- Chữ Nôm: 區自治民族壯廣西

Zhuang name
- Zhuang: Gvangjsih
- 1957 orthography: Gvaŋзsiƅ
- Sawndip: 广西佈僮自治区

Guangxi, (Note: /ɡwɑːŋˈʃiː/, gwahng-SHEE; [kwàŋ.ɕí]; alternately romanized as Kwangsi or Kwanghsi; Chinese: 广西; Zhuang: Gvangjsih) officially the Guangxi Zhuang Autonomous Region (GZAR), is an autonomous region of the People's Republic of China, located in South China and bordering Vietnam (Tuyên Quang, Cao Bằng, Lạng Sơn provinces, and Quảng Ninh City) and the Gulf of Tonkin. Formerly a province, Guangxi became an autonomous region in 1958. Its current capital is Nanning.

Guangxi's location, in mountainous terrain in the far south of China, has placed it on the frontier of Chinese civilization throughout much of Chinese history. The current name "Guang" means "expanse" and has been associated with the region since the creation of Guang Prefecture in 226 AD. It was given provincial level status during the Yuan dynasty, but even into the 20th century, it was considered an open, wild territory. The abbreviation of the region (Chinese: 桂; Hanyu pinyin: Guì; Zhuang: Gvei) comes from the name of the city of Guilin, the provincial capital during both the Ming and Qing dynasties.

Guangxi has the largest ethnic minority population in China. In 2021, a report stated the Zhuang people accounted for 31.36% of the region's population. Various regional languages and dialects such as Pinghua, Zhuang, Kam, Cantonese, Hakka, and Min are spoken alongside Mandarin Chinese.

== Name ==
"Guǎng" (simplified Chinese: 广; traditional Chinese: 廣) means 'expanse' or 'vast', and has been associated with the region since the creation of Guang Prefecture in AD 226. Guangxi and neighboring Guangdong literally mean 'expanse west' and 'expanse east'. Together, Guangxi and Guangdong are called Liangguang (Liangkwang; traditional Chinese: 兩廣; simplified Chinese: 两广; pinyin: liǎng guǎng; Cantonese Yale: léuhng gwóng; lit. 'Two Expanses', Vietnamese: Lưỡng Quảng). During the Song dynasty, the Two Guangs were formally separated as Guǎngnán Xīlù (廣南西路; 广南西路; 'vast south west region') and Guǎngnán Dōnglù (廣南東路; 广南东路; 'vast south east region'), which became abbreviated as Guǎngxī Lù (廣西路; 广西路) and Guǎngdōng Lù (廣東路; 广东路).

Guangxi was also previously spelled as Kwangsi in postal and Wade–Giles romanizations. The spelling of the province was replaced by the pinyin spelling of Guangxi in 1958 and has been widely used internationally after 1986. The official name was also known as Kwangsi Chuang Autonomous Region in a number of Western publications outside of China published in the 1950s to 1970s.

== History ==
Originally inhabited by a mixture of tribal groups known to the Chinese as the Baiyue ("Hundred Yue", Vietnamese: Bách Việt), the region first became part of China during the Qin dynasty. In 214 BC, the Han Chinese general Zhao Tuo (Vietnamese: Triệu Đà) claimed most of southern China for Qin Shi Huang before the emperor's death. The ensuing civil war permitted Zhao to establish a separate kingdom at Panyu known as Nanyue ("Southern Yue"). Alternatively submissive to and independent of Han dynasty control, Southern Yue expanded colonization and sinicization under its policy of "Harmonizing and Gathering the Hundred Yue" (和集百越) until its collapse in 111 BC during the southward expansion of the Han dynasty.

The name "Guangxi" can be traced to the "Expansive" or "Wide" province (廣州) of the Eastern Wu, which controlled southeastern China during the Three Kingdoms period. Guilin formed one of its commanderies.

Under the Tang dynasty, the Zhuang moved to support Piluoge's kingdom of Nanzhao in Yunnan, which successfully repulsed imperial armies in 751 and 754. Guangxi was then divided into an area of Zhuang ascendancy west of Nanning and an area of Han ascendancy east of Nanning.

After the collapse of the Southern Zhao, Liu Yan established the Southern Han (Nanhan) in Xingwangfu (modern Guangdong). Although this state gained minimal control over Guangxi, it was plagued by instability and annexed by the Song dynasty in 971. The name "Guangxi" itself can be traced to the Song, who administered the area as the Guangnanxi ("West Southern Expanse") Circuit. Harassed by both Song and the Jiaozhi in modern Vietnam, the Zhuang leader Nong Zhigao led a revolt in 1052 for which he is still remembered by the Zhuang people. His independent kingdom was short-lived, however, and the tattooed Song general Di Qing returned Guangxi to China.

The Yuan dynasty established control over Yunnan during its conquest of the Dali Kingdom in 1253 and eliminated the Southern Song following the Battle of Yamen in 1279. Rather than ruling Lingnan as a subject territory or military district, the Mongolians then established Guangxi ("Western Expanse") as a proper province. The area nonetheless continued to be unruly, leading the Ming dynasty to employ the different local groups against one another. At the Battle of Big Rattan Gorge between the Zhuang and the Yao in 1465, 20,000 deaths were reported.

During the Ming and Qing dynasties, parts of Guangxi were ruled by the powerful Cen (岑) clan. The Cen were of Zhuang ethnicity and were recognized as tusi or local rulers by the Chinese emperors.

The Qing dynasty left the region alone until the imposition of direct rule in 1726, but the 19th century was one of constant unrest. A Yao revolt in 1831 was followed by the Jintian Uprising, the beginning of the Taiping Rebellion, in January 1851 and the Da Cheng Rebellion in April 1854. The execution of St. Auguste Chapdelaine by local officials in Guangxi provoked the Second Opium War in 1858 and the legalization of foreign interference in the interior. Although Louis Brière de l'Isle was unable to invade its depot at Longzhou, the Guangxi Army saw a great deal of action in the 1884 Sino-French War. Largely ineffective within Vietnam, it was still able to repulse the French from China itself at the Battle of Zhennan Pass (modern Friendship Pass) on 23 March 1885.

Following the Wuchang Uprising, Guangxi seceded from the Qing Empire on 6 November 1911. The Qing governor, Shen Bingdan, initially remained in place but was subsequently removed by a mutiny commanded by General Lu Rongting. General Lu's Old Guangxi clique overran Hunan and Guangdong as well and helped lead the National Protection War against Yuan Shikai's attempt to re-establish an imperial government. Zhuang's loyalty made his Self-Government Army cohesive but reluctant to move far beyond its own provinces. Subsequent feuding with Sun Yat-sen led to defeat in the 1920 and 1921 Guangdong–Guangxi War. After a brief occupation by Chen Jiongming's Cantonese forces, Guangxi fell into disunity and profound banditry for several years until Li Zongren's Guangxi Pacification Army established the New Guangxi clique dominated by Li, Huang Shaohong, and Bai Chongxi.

Successful action in Hunan against Wu Peifu led to the Zhuang GPA becoming known as the "Flying Army" and the "Army of Steel". After the death of Sun Yat-sen, Li also repulsed Tang Jiyao's revolt and joined the Northern Expedition establishing control over other warlords by the Republic of China. His was one of the few Kuomintang units free from serious Chinese Communist Party (CCP) influence and was therefore employed by Chiang Kai-shek for the Shanghai massacre of 1927. Within the People's Republic of China, Guangxi is also noted for the Baise Uprising, a failed CCP revolt led by Chen Zhaoli and Deng Xiaoping in 1929.

In 1937, the Guangxi Women's Battalion was founded as a response to Soong Mei-ling's appeal for women to support the Sino-Japanese War. Reports on the size of the battalion vary from 130 students, to 500, to 800.

Being in the far south, Guangxi did not fall during the Chinese Civil War, but joined the People's Republic in December 1949, two months after its founding.

In 1952, a small section of Guangdong's coastline (Qinzhou, Lianzhou (now Hepu County), Fangchenggang and Beihai) was given to Guangxi, giving it access to the sea. This was reversed in 1955, and then restored in 1965. This made Guangxi the only autonomous region which is not landlocked.

The Guangxi Massacre, during the Cultural Revolution, involved the killing of 100,000 to 150,000 in the region in 1967 and 1968.

While some development of heavy industry occurred in the 1960s and 1970s, the region remained largely a scenic tourist destination. Even the economic growth of the 1990s seemed to leave Guangxi behind. However, in recent years, there has been a growing amount of industrialization and increasing concentration on cash crops. Per capita GDP has risen as industries in Guangdong transfer production to comparatively lower-wage areas in Guangxi.

During the 1979 Sino-Vietnamese War, Guangxi communities were important to the Chinese war effort. They supplied logistical support to the People's Liberation Army, including food and housing. Militia members from Guangxi performed tasks including building roads, bridges, trenches, other logistical efforts, and caring for the wounded.

== Geography ==
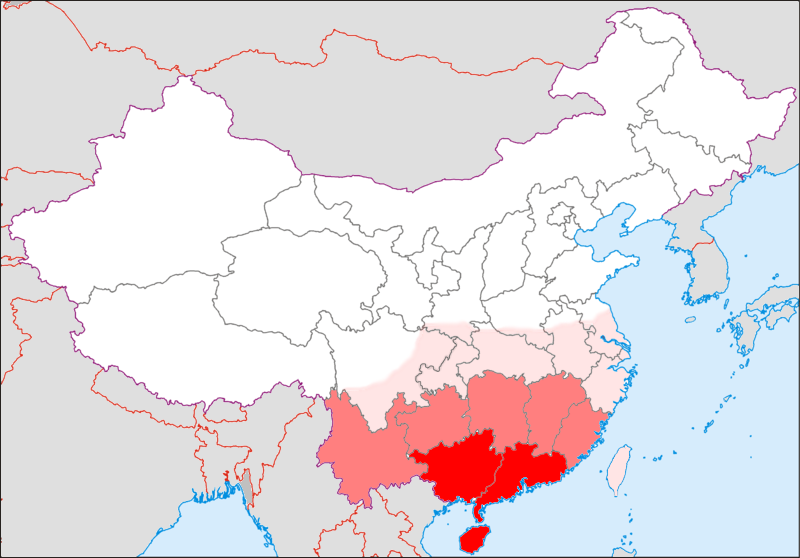
Geographic extension of South China: The three southernmost provinces of China—Guangdong, Guangxi, and Hainan—commonly defined as South China or Lingnan Expanded definition of South China based on the 1945–1949 classification, including additional southern provinces Broad concept of Southern China encompassing a wider geographical and cultural region

Located in the southern part of the country, Guangxi is bordered by Yunnan to the west, Guizhou to the north, Hunan to the northeast, and Guangdong to the east and southeast. It is also bordered by Vietnam in the southwest and the Gulf of Tonkin in the south. Its proximity to Guangdong is reflected in its name, with "Guang" (simplified Chinese: 广; traditional Chinese: 廣; pinyin: Guǎng) being used in both names.

Large portions of Guangxi are hilly and mountainous. The northwest portion of Guangxi includes part of the Yunnan-Guizhou Plateau, the Jiuwan Mountains and the Fenghuang Mountains both run through the north, the Nanling Mountains form the region's north-east border, and the Yuecheng and Haiyang Mountains both branch from the Nanling Mountains. Also in the north are the Duyao Mountains. The Duyang Mountains run through the west of Guangxi. Near the center of the region are the Da Yao and Da Ming Mountains. On the southeastern border are the Yunkai Mountains. Guangxi's highest point is Kitten Mountain, in the Yuecheng Mountains, at 2,141 metres (7,024 ft).

Karst landforms, characterized by steep mountains and large caverns, are common in Guangxi, accounting for 37.8 percent of its total land area.

Guangxi is also home to several river systems, which flow into several different bodies of water: the Qin River and the Nanliu River both flow into the Gulf of Tonkin, several tributary rivers flow into the larger Xiang River in neighbouring Hunan province, and the Xi River system flows southeast through the autonomous region into the South China Sea.

Xi River system schematic (italics indicates rivers outside Guangxi)
| | | | He River (贺江) | Xi River |
| | | Li River | Gui River (桂江) | Xi River |
| Beipan River | Hongshui River | Qian River | Xun River | Xi River |
| Nanpan River | Hongshui River | Qian River | Xun River | Xi River |
| Rong River | Liu River | Qian River | Xun River | Xi River |
| Long River | Liu River | Qian River | Xun River | Xi River |
| You River | Yong River | Yu River | Xun River | Xi River |
| Zuo River | Yong River | Yu River | Xun River | Xi River |

Along the border with Vietnam there is the Ban Gioc–Detian waterfall (pinyin: Dé Tiān Pùbù), which separates the two countries.

About one-quarter of Guangxi's area is forested.

=== Human geography ===
Major cities in Guangxi include Nanning, Liuzhou, Guilin, and Beihai. Notable towns include Longmen, Sanjiang, and Yangshuo. The Xi River system provides waterways which connect to the Pearl River Delta. Important seaports along Guangxi's short coastline on the Gulf of Tonkin include Beihai, Qinzhou, and Fangchenggang. Pinglu Canal was constructed to connect Xi River system and coastal Guangxi.

=== Climate ===
Guangxi has a subtropical climate. Summers are generally long, hot, and humid, lasting from April to October. Winters are mild, and snow is rare. The autonomous region's average annual temperature ranges from 17.5 °C (63.5 °F) to 23.5 °C (74.3 °F), with January temperatures typically ranging from 4 °C (39 °F) to 16 °C (61 °F), and July temperatures typically ranging from 27 °C (81 °F) to 32 °C (90 °F).

Due to frequent rain-bearing monsoon winds, average annual precipitation is quite high in Guangxi, ranging from 1,080 millimetres (43 in) in drier zones to 1,730 millimetres (68 in) in wetter zones. The region also experiences monsoons, blowing from south-southwest from late April to the beginning of October. Most of the precipitation occurs between May and August. Microbursts can also occasionally occur in the extreme south of the region, from July to September. This is caused by typhoons blowing from the South China Sea.

=== Image gallery ===
Li River, Guangxi

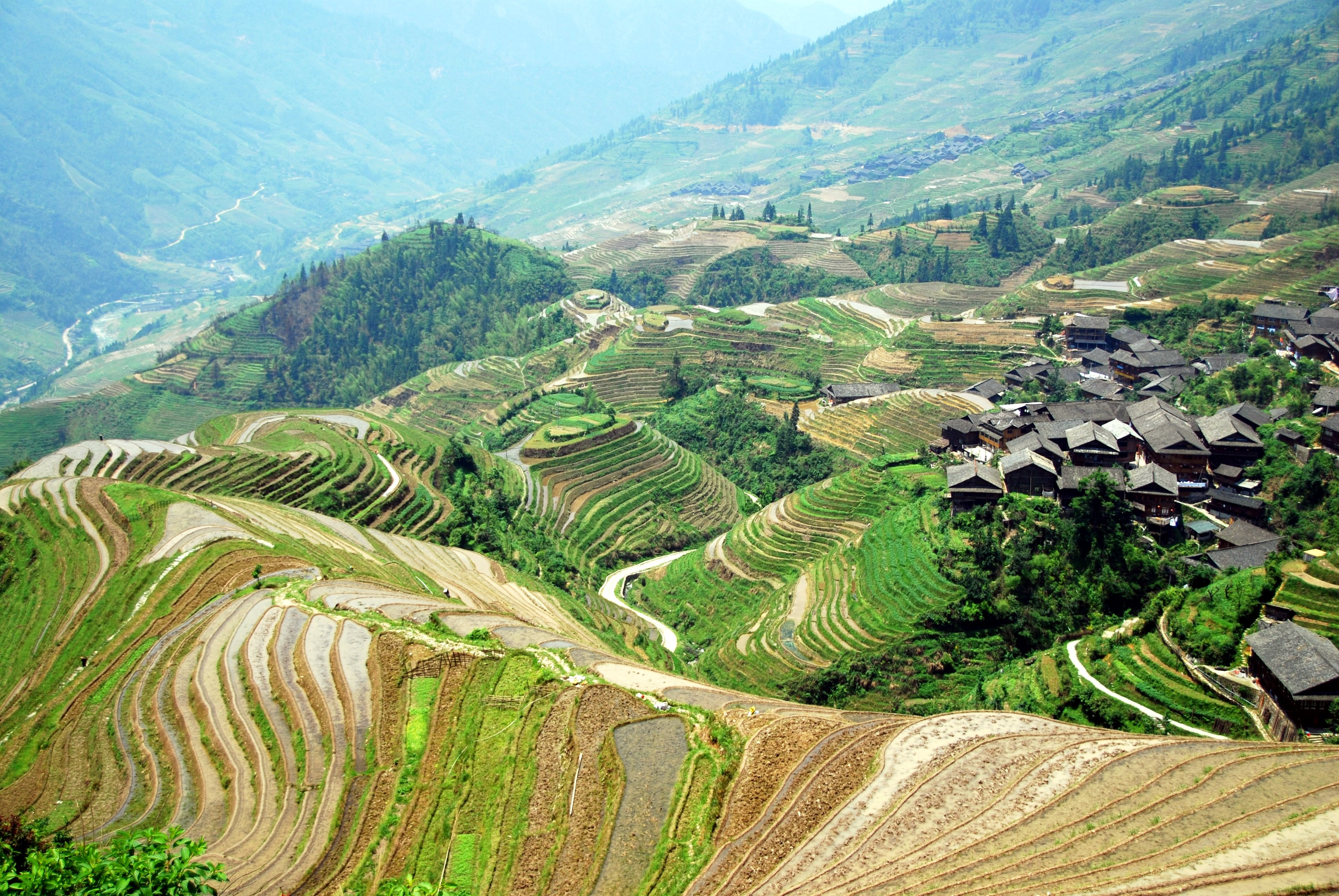
Longsheng Rice Terrace

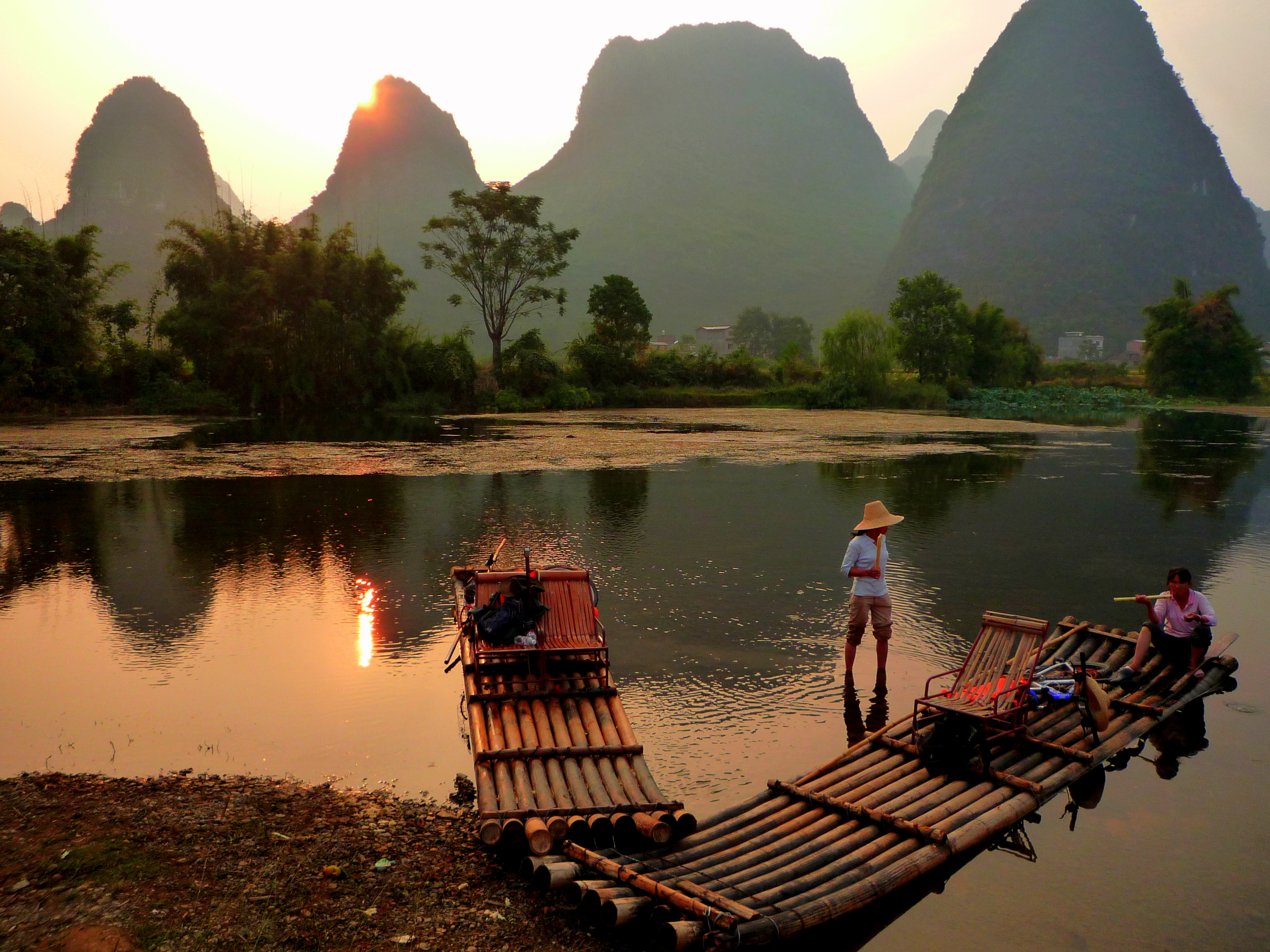
Yulong River

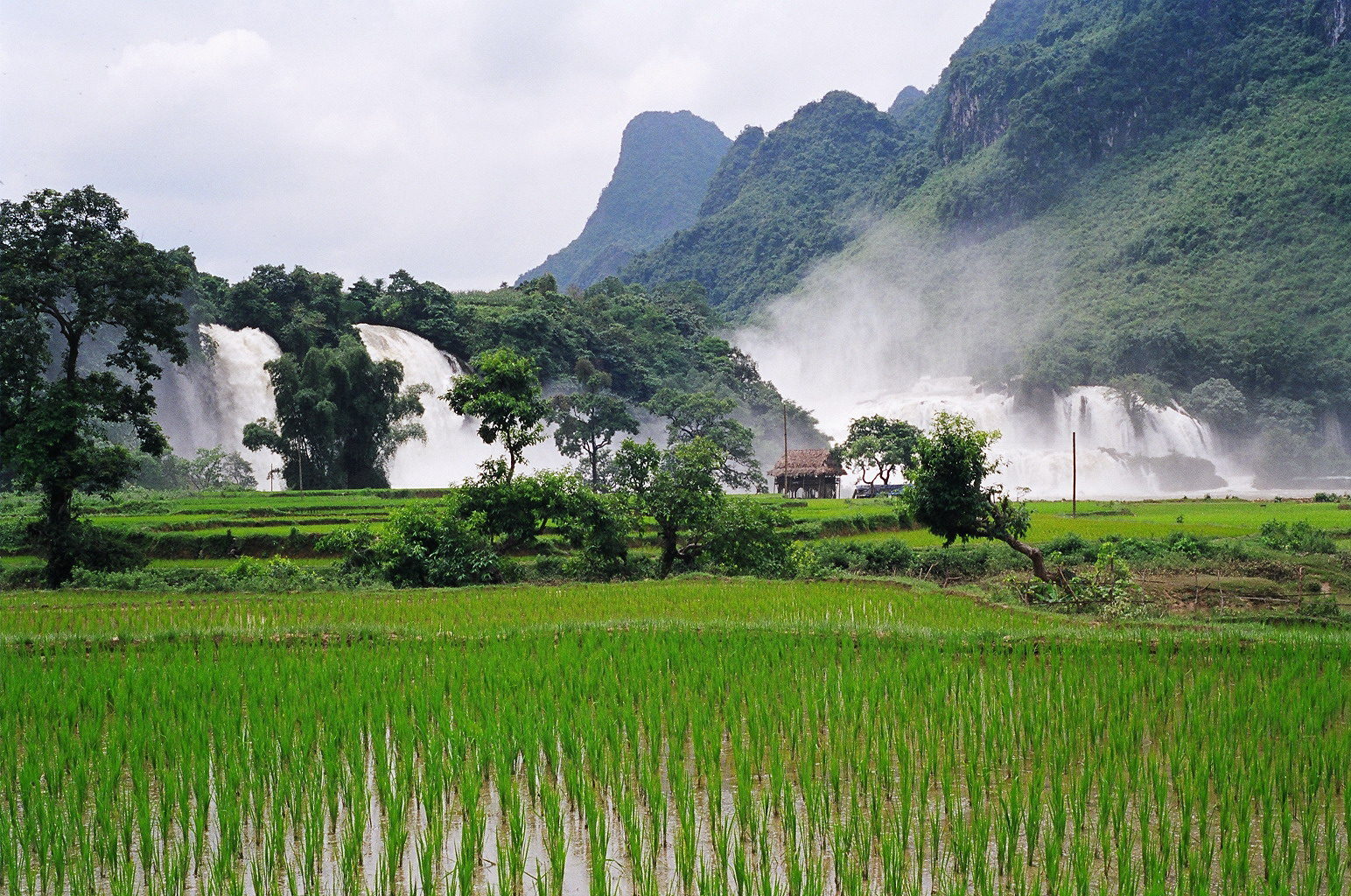
Ban Gioc Duc Thien– Banyue Detian Falls

== Administrative divisions ==
Guangxi is divided into fourteen prefecture-level divisions: all prefecture-level cities:

Administrative divisions of Guangxi
| Division code | Division | Area in km^{2} | Population 2020 | Seat | Divisions | | | |
| Division code | Division | Area in km^{2} | Population 2020 | Seat | Districts | Counties | Aut. counties | CL cities |
|---|---|---|---|---|---|---|---|---|
| 450000 | Guangxi Zhuang Autonomous Region | 236,700.00 | 50,126,804 | Nanning city | 41 | 48 | 12 | 10 |
| 450100 | Nanning city | 22,099.31 | 8,741,584 | Qingxiu District | 7 | 4 | | 1 |
| 450200 | Liuzhou city | 18,596.64 | 4,157,934 | Liubei District | 5 | 3 | 2 | |
| 450300 | Guilin city | 27,667.28 | 4,931,137 | Lingui District | 6 | 8 | 2 | 1 |
| 450400 | Wuzhou city | 12,572.44 | 2,820,977 | Changzhou District | 3 | 3 | | 1 |
| 450500 | Beihai city | 3,988.67 | 1,853,227 | Haicheng District | 3 | 1 | | |
| 450600 | Fangchenggang city | 6,181.19 | 1,046,068 | Gangkou District | 2 | 1 | | 1 |
| 450700 | Qinzhou city | 10,820.85 | 3,302,238 | Qinnan District | 2 | 2 | | |
| 450800 | Guigang city | 10,605.44 | 4,316,262 | Gangbei District | 3 | 1 | | 1 |
| 450900 | Yulin city | 12,828.11 | 5,796,766 | Yuzhou District | 2 | 4 | | 1 |
| 451000 | Baise city | 36,203.85 | 3,571,505 | Youjiang District | 2 | 7 | 1 | 2 |
| 451100 | Hezhou city | 11,771.54 | 2,007,858 | Babu District | 2 | 2 | 1 | |
| 451200 | Hechi city | 33,487.65 | 3,417,945 | Yizhou District | 2 | 4 | 5 | |
| 451300 | Laibin city | 13,391.59 | 2,074,611 | Xingbin District | 1 | 3 | 1 | 1 |
| 451400 | Chongzuo city | 17,345.47 | 2,088,692 | Jiangzhou District | 1 | 5 | | 1 |

Administrative divisions in Zhuang, Chinese, and varieties of romanizations
| English | Zhuang | Chinese | Pinyin |
|---|---|---|---|
| Guangxi Zhuang Autonomous Region | Gvangjish Bouxcuengh Swcigih | 广西壮族自治区 | Guǎngxī zhuàngzú Zìzhìqū |
| Nanning city | Namzningz Si | 南宁市 | Nánníng Shì |
| Liuzhou city | Liujcouh Si | 柳州市 | Liǔzhōu Shì |
| Guilin city | Gveilinz Si | 桂林市 | Guìlín Shì |
| Wuzhou city | Ngouzcouh Si | 梧州市 | Wúzhōu Shì |
| Beihai city | Bwzhaij Si | 北海市 | Běihǎi Shì |
| Fangchenggang city | Fangzcwngzgangj Si | 防城港市 | Fángchénggǎng Shì |
| Qinzhou city | Ginhcouh Si | 钦州市 | Qīnzhōu Shì |
| Guigang city | Gveigangj Si | 贵港市 | Guìgǎng Shì |
| Yulin city | Yoglinz Si | 玉林市 | Yùlín Shì |
| Baise city | Bwzswz Si / Singz Baksaek | 百色市 | Bǎisè Shì |
| Hezhou city | Hocouh Si | 贺州市 | Hèzhōu Shì |
| Hechi city | Hozciz Si | 河池市 | Héchí Shì |
| Laibin city | Laizbinh Si | 来宾市 | Láibīn Shì |
| Chongzuo city | Cungzcoj Si | 崇左市 | Chóngzuǒ Shì |

These 14 prefecture-level cities are in turn subdivided into 111 county-level divisions (41 districts, 10 county-level cities, 48 counties, and 12 autonomous counties). At the year-end of 2021, the total population is 48.85 million.

Population by urban areas of prefecture and county cities
| # | Cities | 2020 Urban area | 2010 Urban area | 2020 City proper |
|---|---|---|---|---|
| 1 | Nanning | 4,939,523 | 2,660,833 (Note: New district established after 2010 census: Wuming (Wuming County). The new district not included in the urban area count of the pre-expanded city.) | 8,741,584 |
| 2 | Liuzhou | 2,204,841 | 1,410,712 (Note: New district established after 2010 census: Liujiang (Liujiang County). The new district not included in the urban area count of the pre-expanded city.) | 4,157,934 |
| 3 | Guilin | 1,361,244 | 844,290 (Note: New district established after 2010 census: Lingui (Lingui County). The new district not included in the urban area count of the pre-expanded city.) | 4,931,137 |
| 4 | Guigang | 921,440 | 658,887 | 4,316,262 |
| 5 | Yulin | 877,561 | 547,924 | 5,796,766 |
| 6 | Qinzhou | 771,052 | 489,139 | 3,302,238 |
| 7 | Beihai | 673,483 | 463,388 | 1,853,227 |
| 8 | Wuzhou | 665,910 | 424,734 (Note: New district established after 2010 census: Longxu by splitting from parts of Cangwu County. The new district areas from Cangwu County not included in the urban area count of the pre-expanded city.) | 2,820,977 |
| 9 | Guiping | 652,210 | 508,212 | see Guigang |
| 10 | Beiliu | 573,761 | 652,853 | see Yulin |
| 11 | Hezhou | 560,686 | 379,889 (Note: New district established after 2010 census: Pinggui by splitting from parts of Zhongshan County and parts of Babu. The new district areas from Zhongshan County not included in the urban area count of the pre-expanded city.) | 2,007,858 |
| 12 | Laibin | 531,511 | 315,875 | 2,074,611 |
| 13 | Baise | 513,983 | 185,497 (Note: New district established after 2010 census: Tianyang (Tianyang County). The new district not included in the urban area count of the pre-expanded city.) | 3,571,505 |
| 14 | Hechi | 504,030 | 197,858 (Note: New district established after 2010 census: Yizhou (Yizhou CLC). The new district not included in the urban area count of the pre-expanded city.) | 3,417,945 |
| 15 | Fangchenggang | 416,752 | 278,955 | 1,046,068 |
| 16 | Cenxi | 397,639 | 337,052 | see Wuzhou |
| 17 | Pingguo | 277,500 | (Note: Pingguo County is currently known as Pingguo CLC after 2010 census.) | see Baise |
| 18 | Chongzuo | 265,077 | 113,539 | 2,088,692 |
| 19 | Dongxing | 155,538 | 92,267 | see Fangchenggang |
| 20 | Jingxi | 150,456 | (Note: Jingxi County is currently known as Jingxi CLC after 2010 census.) | see Baise |
| 21 | Lipu | 146,753 | (Note: Lipu County is currently known as Lipu CLC after 2010 census.) | see Guilin |
| 22 | Heshan | 48,873 | 66,118 | see Laibin |
| — | Yizhou | see Hechi | 155,365 | see Hechi |

== Demographics ==
Historical population
| Year | Pop. | ±% |
|---|---|---|
| 1912 | 7,879,000 | — |
| 1928 | 13,648,000 | +73.2% |
| 1936–37 | 13,385,000 | −1.9% |
| 1947 | 14,636,000 | +9.3% |
| 1954 | 19,560,822 | +33.6% |
| 1964 | 20,845,017 | +6.6% |
| 1982 | 36,420,960 | +74.7% |
| 1990 | 42,245,765 | +16.0% |
| 2000 | 43,854,538 | +3.8% |
| 2010 | 46,026,629 | +5.0% |
| 2020 | 50,126,804 | +8.9% |

Largest cities in Guangxi Source: China Urban Construction Statistical Yearbook 2018 Urban Population and Urban Temporary Population
| Rank | Name | Pop. | Rank | Name | Pop. |
|---|---|---|---|---|---|
| 1 | Nanning | 3,614,200 | 11 | Baise | 271,000 |
| 2 | Liuzhou | 1,830,800 | 12 | Fangchenggang | 248,000 |
| 3 | Guilin | 946,400 | 13 | Beiliu | 234,000 |
| 4 | Yulin | 756,300 | 14 | Guiping | 209,500 |
| 5 | Wuzhou | 629,300 | 15 | Hezhou | 203,000 |
| 6 | Beihai | 497,600 | 16 | Chongzuo | 191,000 |
| 7 | Guigang | 426,700 | 17 | Cenxi | 178,000 |
| 8 | Qinzhou | 375,000 | 18 | Jingxi | 165,000 |
| 9 | Hechi | 357,000 | 19 | Dongxing | 99,500 |
| 10 | Laibin | 331,600 | 20 | Pingxiang | 79,600 |

=== Ethnic groups ===
The Han Chinese are the largest ethnic group in Guangxi. Han Chinese populations in Guangxi largely live along the autonomous region's southern coast and eastern portions. Of these, the main subgroups are those that speak Yue and Southwestern Mandarin varieties of Chinese. Qinzhou and Goulou Yue are spoken in the southern and eastern regions, respectively. Pinghua is spoken in Nanning and Guilin. There are Hakka-speaking regions in Luchuan County, Bobai County and in some areas bordering Vietnam.

Guangxi has over 16 million Zhuangs, the largest minority ethnicity in China. Over 90 percent of Zhuang in China live in Guangxi, especially in the central and western regions. High concentrations of Zhuang people can be found in Nanning, Liuzhou, Chongzuo, Baise, Hechi, and Laibin. The highest concentration of ethnic Zhuang people is found in the county-level city of Jingxi, with a 2021 publication by the People's Government of Guangxi stating that Jingxi's population is 99.7% Zhuang.

The autonomous region also has sizable populations of indigenous Yao, Miao, Kam, Mulam, Maonan, Hui, Bouyei, Gin, Yi, Sui and Gelao peoples. Other ethnic minorities in Guangxi include the Manchu, Mongol, Korean, Tibetan, Hlai, and Tujia people.

Ethnic makeup of the Guanxi Zhuang Autonomous Region (2020 Seventh National Census)
| Ethnicity | Han Chinese | Zhuang | Yao | Miao | Dong | Mulao | Maonan | Hui | Bouyei | Gin | Other nationalities |
|---|---|---|---|---|---|---|---|---|---|---|---|
| Population | 31,318,824 | 15,721,956 | 1,683,038 | 578,122 | 362,580 | 180,185 | 73,199 | 35,347 | 31,303 | 29,326 | 112,924 |
| Percentage (%) | 62.48 | 31.36 | 3.36 | 1.15 | 0.72 | 0.36 | 0.15 | 0.07 | 0.06 | 0.06 | 0.23 |
| Proportion of minority population (%) | － | 83.59 | 8.95 | 3.07 | 1.93 | 0.96 | 0.39 | 0.19 | 0.17 | 0.16 | 0.60 |

=== Religion ===
Religion in Guangxi (Note: The data was collected by the Chinese General Social Survey (CGSS) of 2009 and by the Chinese Spiritual Life Survey (CSLS) of 2007, reported and assembled by Xiuhua Wang (2015) to confront the proportion of people identifying with two similar social structures: ① Christian churches, and ② the traditional Chinese religion of the lineage (i.e. people believing and worshipping ancestral deities often organised into lineage "churches" and ancestral shrines). Data for other religions with a significant presence in China (deity cults, Buddhism, Taoism, folk religious sects, Islam, et al.) was not reported by Wang.)
1. Chinese ancestral religion (40.5%)
2. Christianity (0.26%)
3. Other religions or not religious people (Note: This may include: Buddhists; Confucians; Deity worshippers; Taoists; Members of folk religious sects; Indigenous religions of the ethnic minorities; Small minorities of Muslims; And people not bound to, nor practicing any, institutional or diffuse religion.) (59.3%)

The predominant religions in Guangxi among the Han Chinese are Chinese folk religions, Taoist traditions and Chinese Buddhism. The large Zhuang population mostly practices the Zhuang folk religion centered around the worship of their ancestral god Buluotuo (布洛陀). According to surveys conducted in 2007 and 2009, 40.48% of the population believes and is involved in ancestor veneration, while 0.26% of the population identifies as Christian.

The reports did not give figures for other types of religion; 59.26% of the population may be either irreligious or involved in worship of nature deities, Buddhism, Confucianism, Taoism, folk religious sects. The Yao, another numerous ethnic group inhabiting the province, mostly practices a form of indigenised and conservative Taoism.

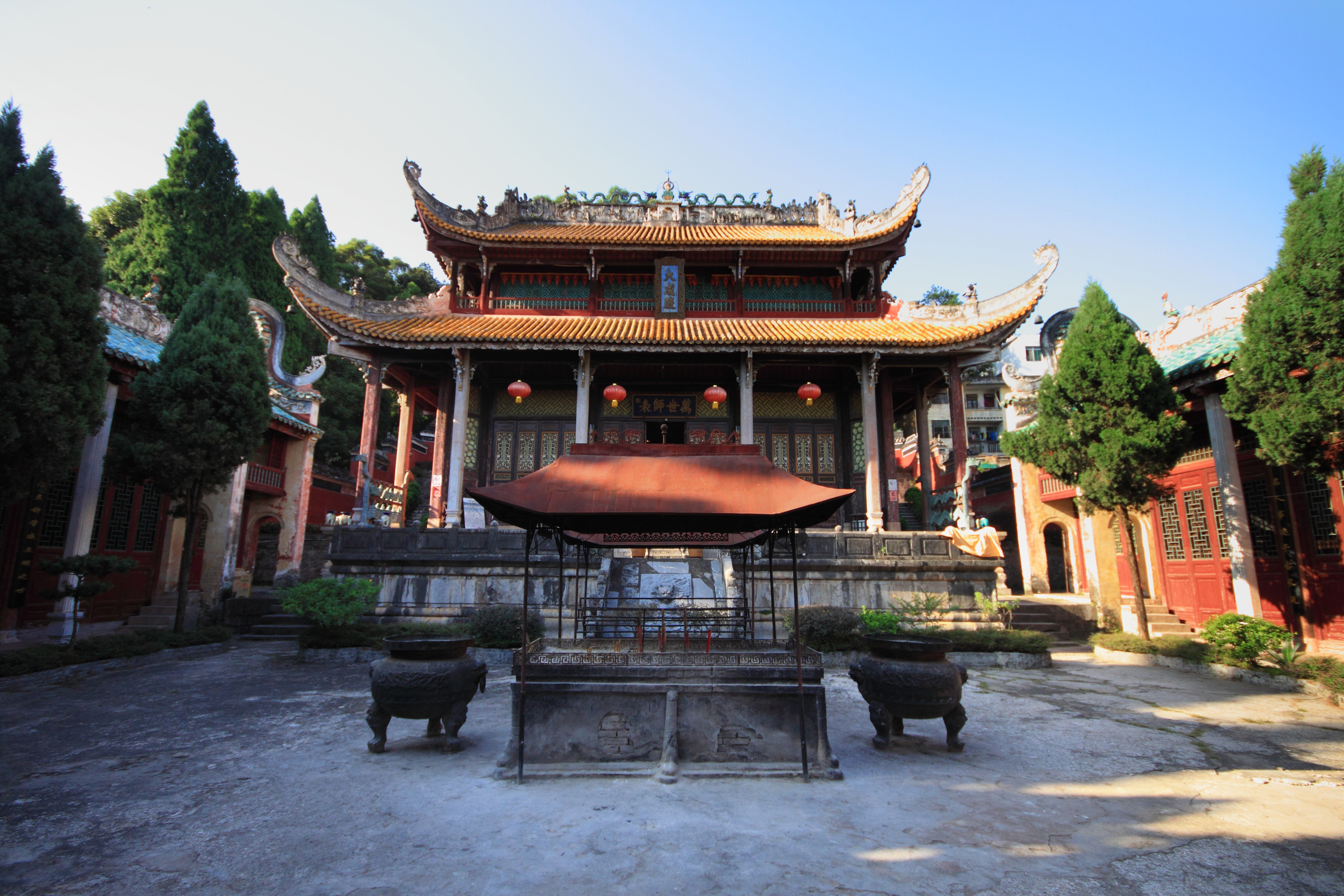
Wenmiao (Temple of the God of Culture, Confucius) in Gongcheng.

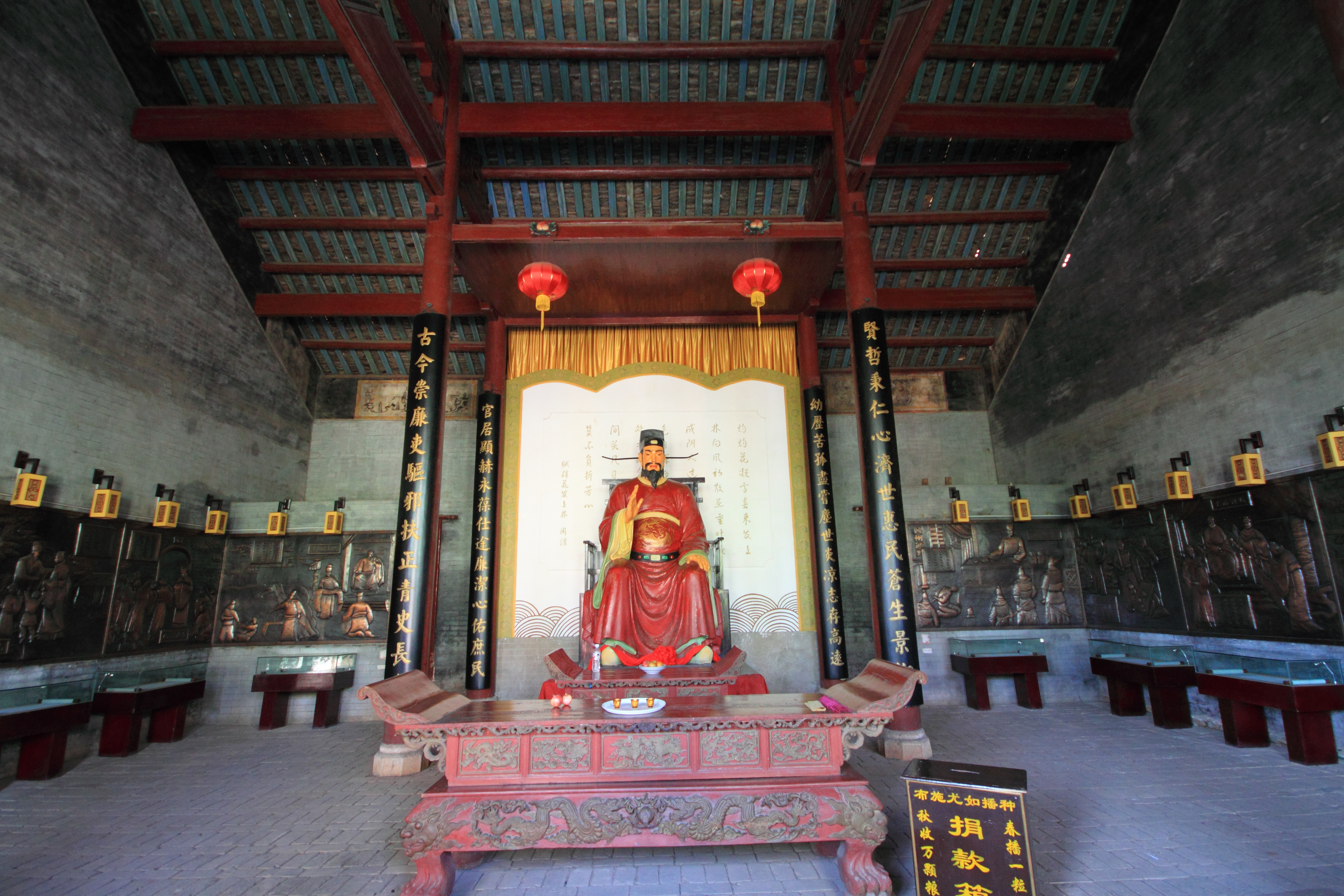
Shrine of Zhou Wei in Gongcheng.

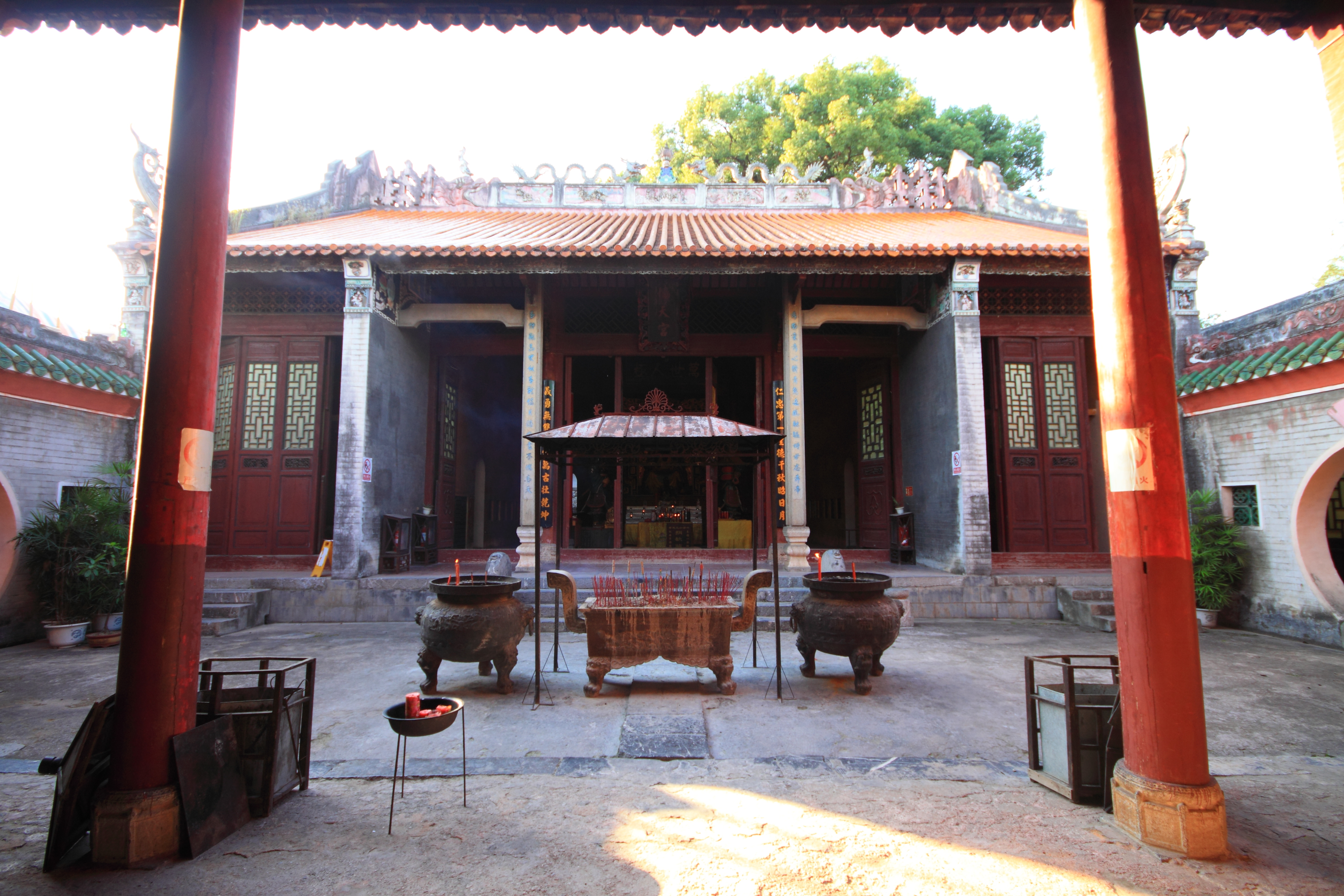
Wumiao (Temple of the God of War, Guandi) in Gongcheng.

Today, there are 21 mosques in Guangxi. This includes:

- Nanning Mosque
- Guilin Chongshan Mosque
- Guilin Ancient Mosque
- Liuzhou Mosque
- Baise Mosque

== Politics ==
Secretaries-General of the KMT Guangxi Provincial Senate

1. Ou Wenxiong (區文雄): 1938–1942
2. Huang Kunshan (黃崑山): 1942–1946
3. Sun Renlin (孫仁林): 1946–1949

Chairmen of the Senate

1. Li Renren (李任仁): 1938–1942
2. Huang Xuchu (黃旭初): 1942–1949

Secretaries of the CPC Guangxi Committee

1. Zhang Yunyi: 1949–1953
2. Chen Manyuan (陈漫远): 1953–1957
3. Liu Jianxun (刘建勋): 1957–1961
4. Wei Guoqing: 1960–1966
5. Qiao Xiaoguang (乔晓光): 1966–1967
6. Wei Guoqing: 1970–1975
7. An Pingsheng (安平生): 1975–1977.
8. Qiao Xiaoguang (乔晓光): 1977–1985
9. Chen Huiguang (陈辉光): 1985–1990
10. Zhao Fulin (赵富林): 1990–1997
11. Cao Bochun: 1997–2006
12. Liu Qibao: 2006–2007
13. Guo Shengkun: 2007–2012
14. Peng Qinghua: 2012–2018
15. Lu Xinshe (鹿心社): 2018 – 2021
16. Liu Ning (刘宁): 2021 – 2024
17. Chen Gang (陈刚): 2024 – present

Chairmen of Government

1. Zhang Yunyi: 1949–1953
2. Chen Manyuan: 1953–1958
3. Wei Guoqing: 1958–1975
4. An Pingsheng (安平生): 1975–1977
5. Qiao Xiaoguang: 1977–1979
6. Qin Yingji (覃应机): 1979–1983
7. Wei Chunshu (韦纯束): 1983–1990
8. Cheng Kejie: 1990–1998
9. Li Zhaozhuo: 1998–2003
10. Lu Bing: 2003 – December 2007
11. Ma Biao: December 2007 – 2013
12. Chen Wu: March 2013 – October 2020
13. Lan Tianli (蓝天立): October 2020 – May 2025
14. Wei Tao (韦韬): July 2025 – present (acting)

== Economy ==
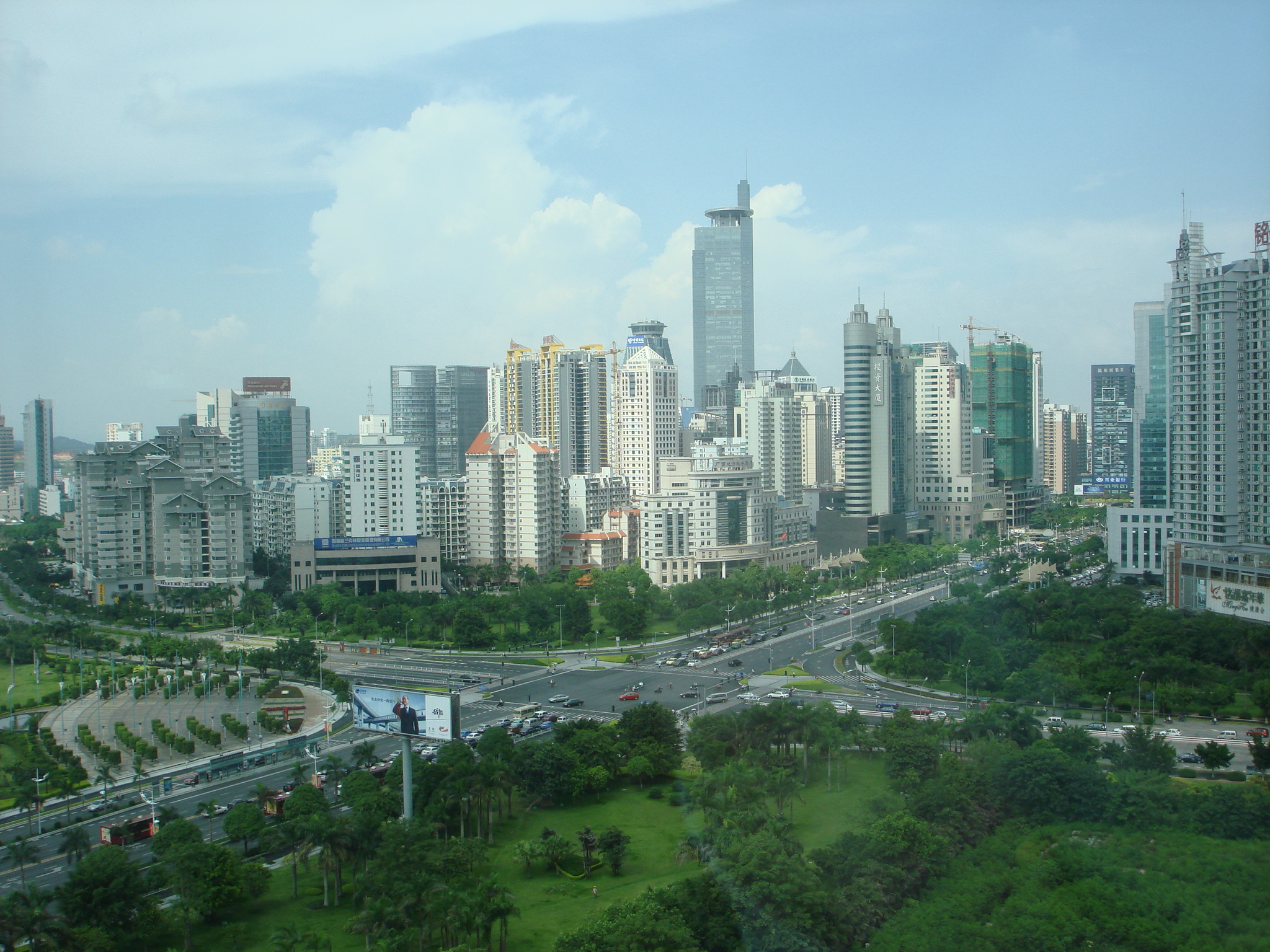
View of Nanning, the capital and economic center of Guangxi

Important crops in Guangxi include rice, maize and sweet potatoes. Cash crops include sugar cane, peanuts, tobacco, and kenaf.

85 percent of the world's star anise is grown in Guangxi. It is a major ingredient in the antiviral oseltamivir.

Guangxi is one of China's key production centers for nonferrous metals. The region holds approximately 1/3 of all tin and manganese deposits in China.

Liuzhou is the main industrial center and a major motor vehicle manufacturing center. General Motors have a manufacturing base here in a joint venture as SAIC-GM-Wuling Automobile. The city also has a large steel factory and several related industries. The local government of Guangxi hopes to expand the region's manufacturing sector, and during the drafting of China's Five Year Plan in 2011, earmarked 2.6 trillion RMB for investment in the region's Beibu Gulf Economic Zone (See Below).

In recent years Guangxi's economy has languished behind that of its wealthy neighbor and twin, Guangdong. Guangxi's 2017 nominal GDP was about 2039.63 billion yuan (US$302.09 billion) and ranked 17th in China. Its per capita GDP was 38,102 yuan (US$5,770).

Due to its lack of a major manufacturing industry in comparison to other provincial-level regions, Guangxi is the fourth most energy efficient provincial-level region in China, helping to further boost its green image.

As the only coastal region in China with close proximity to Southeast Asia, Guangxi holds a strategic position in China's trade with the Association of Southeast Asian Nations (ASEAN).

=== Economic and technological development zones ===
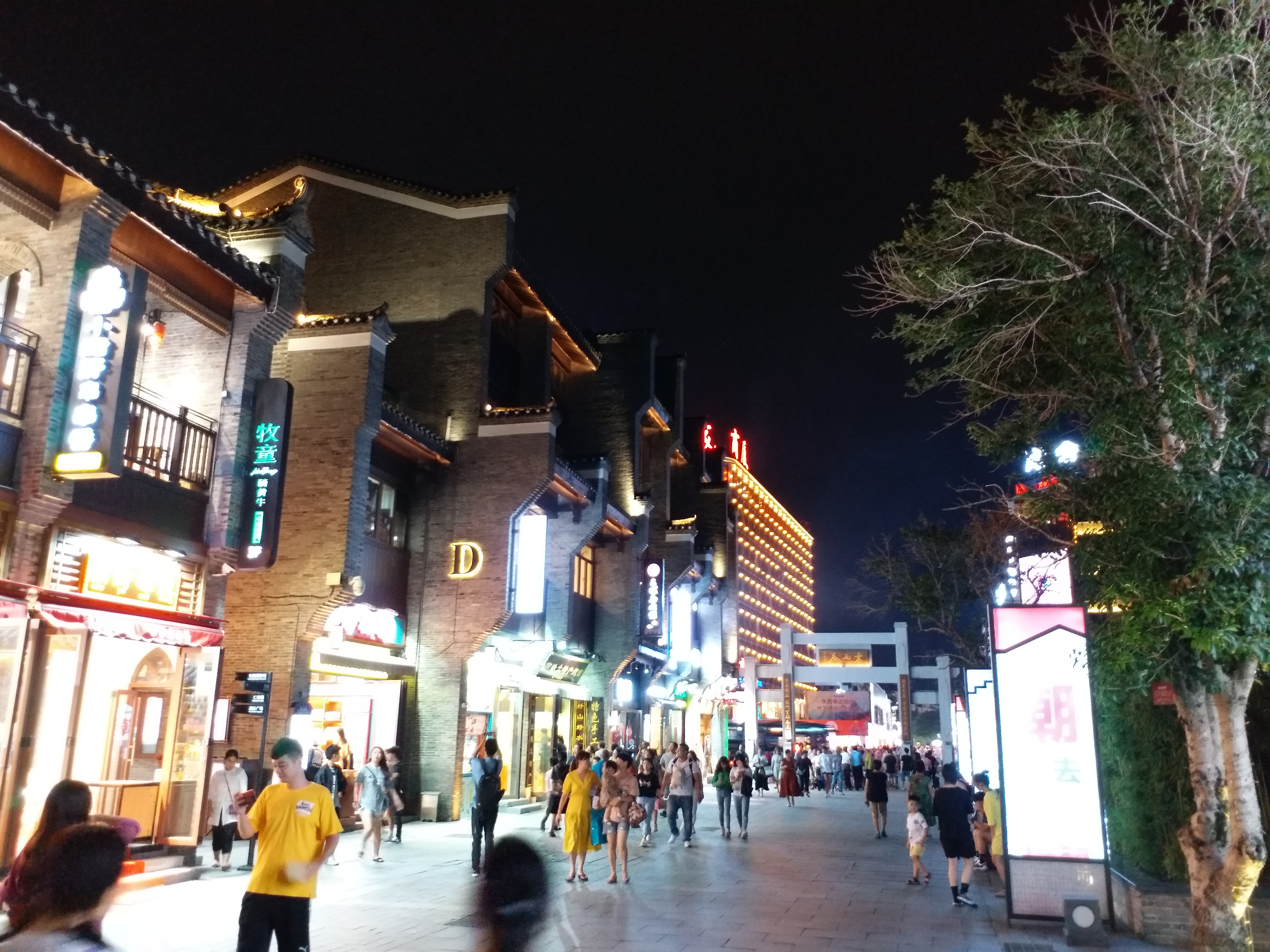
A commercial street in Guilin

- Beihai Silver Beach National Tourist Holiday Resort
- Beihai Export Processing Zone

Approved by the State Council, Beihai Export Processing Zone (BHEPZ) was established in March 2003. Total planned area is 1.454 square kilometres (0.561 sq mi). The first phase of the developed area is 1.135 square kilometres (0.438 sq mi). It was verified and accepted by the Customs General Administration and eight ministries of the state, on 26 December 2003. It is the Export Processing Zone nearest to ASEAN in China and also the only one bordering the sea in western China. It is situated next to Beihai Port.

- Dongxing Border Economic Cooperation Area
- Guilin National New & Hi-Tech Industrial Development Zone

Guilin Hi-Tech Industrial Development Zone was established in May 1988. In 1991, it was approved as a national-level industrial zone. It has an area of 12.07 square kilometres (4.66 sq mi). Encouraged industries include electronic information, biomedical, new materials, and environmental protection.

- Nanning Economic & Technological Development Area

Established in 1992, Nanning Economic and Technological Development Zone was approved to be a national-level zone in May 2001. Its total planned area of 10.796 square kilometres (4.168 sq mi). It is located in the south of Nanning. It has become the new developing zone with fine chemical engineering, auto parts, aluminum processing, biological medicine and other industries.

- Nanning National Hi-Tech Industrial Development Zone

Nanning Hi-Tech Industrial Development Zone was established in 1988 and was approved as a national-level industrial zone in 1992. The zone has a planned area of 43.7 square kilometres (16.9 sq mi), and it encourages industries that do electronic information, bioengineering and pharmaceutical, mechanical and electrical integration, and the new materials industry.

- Pingxiang Border Economic Cooperation Zone

In 1992, Pinxiang Border Economic Cooperation Zone was established. It has a total area of 7.2 square kilometres (2.8 sq mi). It focuses on the development of hardware mechanical and electrical products, daily-use chemical processing, services, and the international logistics-based storage and information industry.

- Yongning Economic Development Zone

=== Investment ===
Seventy-one Taiwanese ventures started up in Guangxi in 2007, with contracts bringing up to US$149 million of investment, while gross exports surpassed US$1 billion. There are a total of 1182 Taiwan ventures in Guangxi, and by the end of 2006, they have brought a total of US$4.27 billion of investment into the autonomous region. During the first half of 2007, 43 projects worthy of RMB 2.6 billion (US$342 million) have already been contracted between Guangxi and Taiwan investors. Cooperation between Guangxi and Taiwan companies mainly relates to manufacturing, high-tech electronic industries, agriculture, energy resources, and tourism.

=== Power ===
Guangxi Power Grid invested 180 million yuan in 2007 in projects to bring power to areas that still lacked access to electricity. The areas affected include Nanning, Hechi, Bose and Guigang. Around 125,000 people have gained access to electricity. The money has been used to build or alter 738 10-kilovolt distribution units with a total length of wire reaching 1,831.8 kilometers.

Due to a lack of investment in construction in the power grid net in rural areas, more than 400 villages in Guangxi Province were not included in the projects. Around 500,000 cannot participate in the policy known as "The Same Grid, the Same Price". Guangxi Power Grid will invest 4.6 billion yuan in improving the power grid during the 11th Five Year Plan.

Guangxi Power Grid invested 2.5 billion yuan in building an electric power system in the first half of 2007. Of the total investment, 2.3 billion yuan has been put into the project of the main power grid. So far, four new transformer substations in Guangxi are in various stages of completion. Wenfu substation went into operation in the city of Hechi in January 2007, and since then it has become a major hub of the electrical power system of the surrounding three counties. When the Cangwu substation was completed, it doubled the local transformer capacity. In June 2007, the new substation in Chongzuo passed its operation tests. And in the same month, Qiulong commenced production too. This shall support the power supply system of Qiulong City, as well as the northern part of the Guangxi region, and facilitate the nationwide project to transmit power from west to east.

=== Beibu Gulf Economic Zone ===
In late February 2008, the central government approved China's first international and regional economic cooperation zone in Guangxi. The construction of the Beibu Gulf Economic Zone began in 2006. With the approval, the Beibu Gulf Economic Zone will be formally incorporated into national development strategies.

The Beibu Gulf Economic Zone covers six coastal cities along the Beibu Gulf. It integrates the cities of Nanning, the region's capital, Beihai, Qinzhou, Fangchenggang, Chongzuo and Yulin. The state will adopt policies and measures to support mechanism innovation, rational industry layout, and infrastructure construction in the Beibu Gulf Economic Zone.

Guangxi has pledged a 100 billion yuan (US$14 billion) investment over the next five years for building and repairing 2,500 km (1,600 mi) railways to form a network hub in the area. Beibu Gulf Zone will serve as the logistics base, business base, processing and manufacturing base, and information exchange center for China-ASEAN cooperation. Beibu Gulf Zone promises broad prospects for further development and its growth potential is rapidly released. But the shortage of talent and professionals in petrochemicals, iron and steel, electricity, finance, tourism, port planning, logistics and marine industries are bottlenecks.

The regional government is also working on speeding up key cooperation projects including transportation, the marine industry, agriculture, forestry, fisheries, energy development, cross-border tourism, and environmental protection. Beibu Gulf has already attracted several major projects such as Qinzhou oil refinery projects and Stora Enso, a Fortune 500 forest products company based in Finland. In January 2008 trade import and export in the Beibu Gulf zone exceeded US$1.3 billion, a record high.

=== Bauxite reserves ===
In September 2007, China's Ministry of Commerce said that it has found 120 million tons of new bauxite reserves in Guangxi. The ministry said that the new reserves, which are located in Chongzhou in the southern region of Youjiang, have very high-quality bauxite, a raw material for making aluminum. Currently, the proven reserves of bauxite in Guangxi are about 1 billion tons, making the province one of the country's biggest bauxite sources.

== Transport ==
=== Rail ===
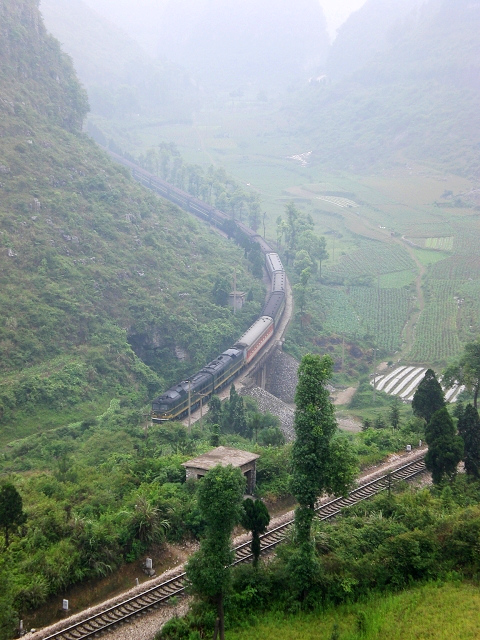
The Guizhou–Guangxi Railway near the Layi Station in Nandan County, Hechi

The Hunan–Guangxi Railway (Xianggui Line), which bisects the autonomous region diagonally from Quanzhou in the northeast on the border with Hunan to Pingxiang in the southwest on the border with Vietnam, passes through Guangxi's three principal cities, Nanning, Liuzhou and Guilin. Most other railways in Guangxi are connected to the Xianggui Line.

From Nanning, the Nanning–Kunming Railway heads west through Baise to Kunming, Yunnan and the Nanning–Fangchenggang Railway runs south to Qinzhou, Fangchenggang and Beihai on the coast. From Liuzhou, the Guizhou–Guangxi Railway extends northwestward through Hechi to Guizhou and the Jiaozuo–Liuzhou Railway runs due north to Hunan, and eventually Hubei and Henan in central China. From Litang Township on the Xianggui Line between Nanning and Liuzhou, the Litang–Qinzhou Railway runs south to Qinzhou on the coast and the Litang–Zhanjiang Railway (Lizhan Line) extends southeastward through Guigang and Yulin to Zhanjiang, Guangdong.

The Luoyang–Zhanjiang Railway (Luozhan Line), which intersects with the Xianggui Line on the Hunan side of the border at Yongzhou, runs south through Hezhou and Wuzhou in eastern Guangxi and joins the Lizhan Line at Yulin. At Cenxi, a branch of the Luozhan Line heads east to Maoming, Guangdong, forming a second rail outlet from Guangxi to Guangdong.

=== Aviation ===
Guangxi has 7 airports in different cities: Nanning, Guilin, Beihai, Liuzhou, Wuzhou, Baise, and Hechi.

== Culture ==
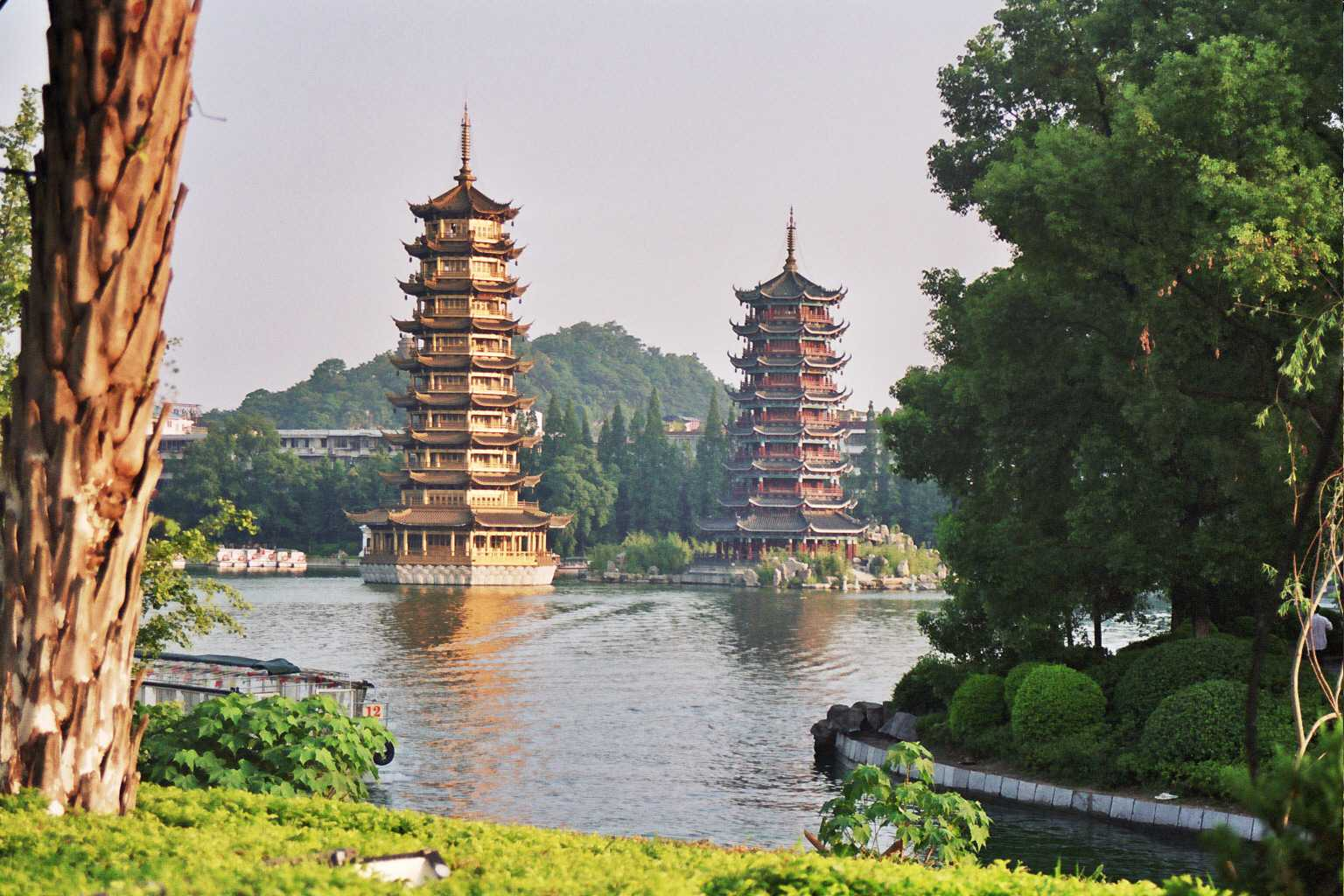
Pagodas in Guilin

"Guangxi" and neighbouring Guangdong literally mean "Western Expanse" and "Eastern Expanse". Together, Guangdong and Guangxi are called the "Two Expanses" (simplified Chinese: 两广; traditional Chinese: 兩廣; pinyin: Liǎngguǎng).

Its culture and language are reflected in this. Though now associated with the Zhuang ethnic minority, Guangxi's culture traditionally has had a close connection with Cantonese. Cantonese culture and language followed the Xi River valley from Guangdong and are still predominant in the eastern half of Guangxi today. Outside of this area, there is a huge variety of ethnicities and language groups represented.

Guangxi is known for its ethnolinguistic diversity. In the capital of Nanning, for example, three varieties of Chinese are spoken locally: Southwestern Mandarin, Yue (specifically Cantonese), and Pinghua, in addition to various Zhuang languages and others.

=== Cuisine ===
Guangxi cuisine is known as guìcài (Chinese: 桂菜); however, it is not as affluent as that of its more known neighbours such as Sichuan, Hunan or Guangdong. Much of Guangxi's local cuisine is centered around the cuisine of its ethnic minorities. This includes the more well known Luosifen soup, Chinese: 桂林米粉; pinyin: guìlín mǐfěn and a variety of pickled dishes.

=== Languages ===
Guangxi is highly linguistically diverse. Aside from Chinese languages such as Guiliu Mandarin and Yue Chinese, Guangxi is also home to significant Zhuang, Kam, Mulam, Maonan, Hmong, Mien, Bunu, Lajia, Sui, Gelao, Nuosu, and Vietnamese (Kinh) speaking populations.

==== Chinese languages ====
Significant populations of almost all top-level Chinese language families can be found in Guangxi.

11.6 million Yue Chinese speakers live in Guangxi, with the majority of them speaking either Goulou (6.8 million) or Yongxun (4.7 million) varieties. Smaller populations of Guangfu (720 thousand) and Qinlian (3.9 million) speakers can also be found, primarily distributed along the Pearl River and the southern coast of the province respectively.

Of the 5.4 million dialectal Mandarin speakers who call Guangxi home, 5.2 million speak Guiliu Mandarin, a subgroup of Southwestern Mandarin. Smaller populations speak varieties closely related to that of southern Guizhou (265 thousand) and Yunnan (123 thousand). These speakers of dialectal Mandarin are primarily distributed in the north and west of the province, in prefectures such as Guilin and Liuzhou.

Populations of what is typically called Pinghua can also be found. 1.8 million speak Northern Pinghua, and 2.4 million speak Southern Pinghua; the latter of which is more closely related to Yue. There are also around 1.3 million Xiang Chinese speakers, primarily found in and around Quanzhou county, and 140 thousand Min Chinese speakers.

Almost all counties in Guangxi have multiple varieties of Chinese natively spoken.

== Tourism ==
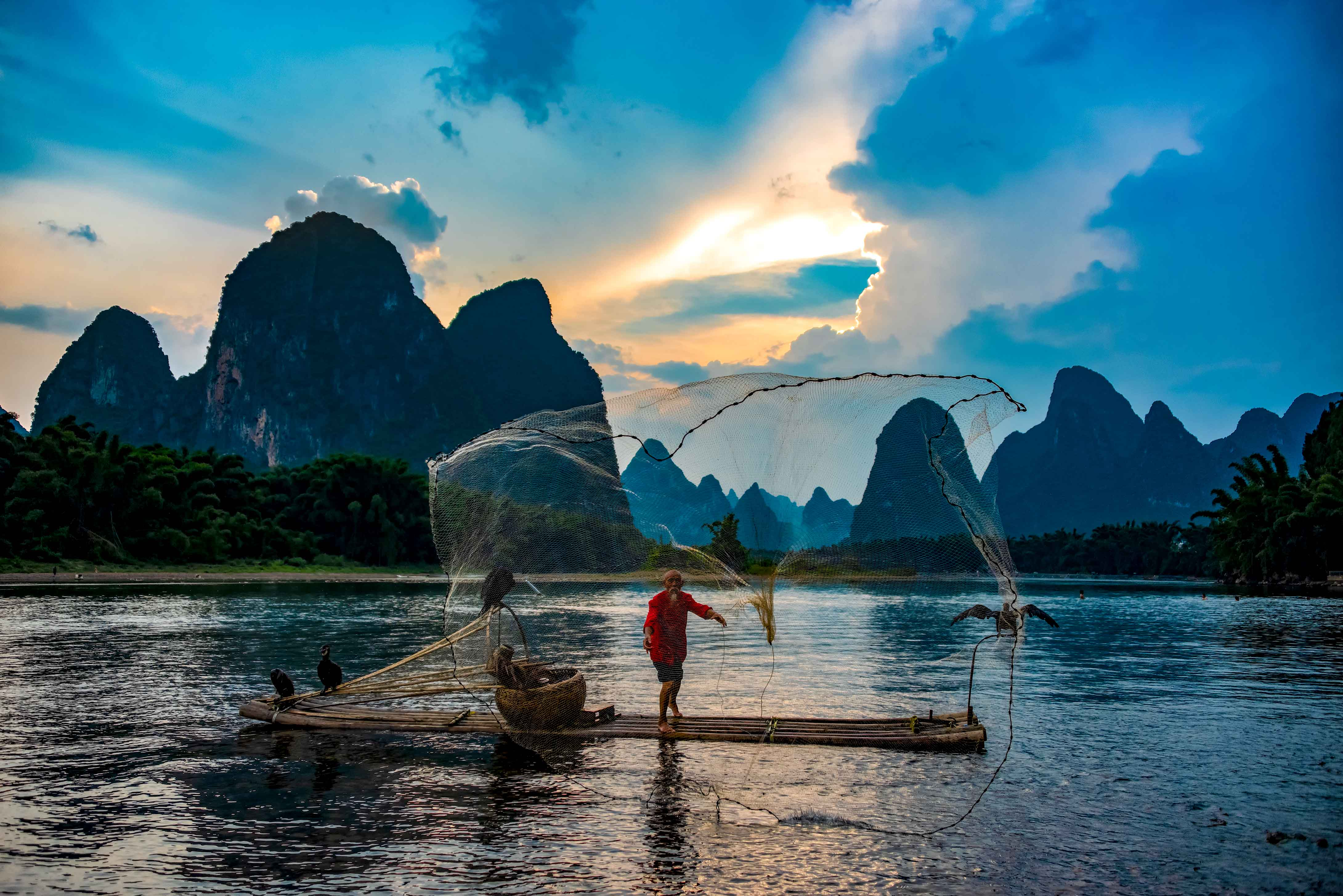
Cormorant fisherman on the Li River in Yangshuo County

The major tourist attraction of Guangxi is Guilin, a city famed across China and the world for its spectacular setting by the Li Jiang (Li River) among karst peaks. It also used to be the capital of Guangxi and Jingjiang Princes' City, the old princes' residence, is open to the public. South of Guilin down the river is the town of Yangshuo, which has become a favourite destination for foreign tourists.

The variety of visible cultures in Guangxi, such as the Zhuang and Dong, are also a draw for tourists. The northern part of the region, bordering Guizhou, is home to the Longsheng Rice Terraces, some of the steepest in the world. Nearby is Sanjiang Dong Autonomous County.

Many Chinese tourists visiting Nanning also visit Ban Gioc–Detian Falls on the China-Vietnam border.

== Education ==
- Guilin University of Technology
- Guangxi Arts University
- Guangxi University
- Guangxi Medical University
- Guangxi Normal University
- Guilin University of Electronic Technology
- Guangxi University for Nationalities
- Guangxi Chinese Medical University
- Hengxian Middle School

== Sister regions ==
- – Kumamoto Prefecture (1982)
- – Carinthia (1987)
- – Rio Grande do Norte (1995)
- – Newport (formerly) (1996–2019)
- – Voronezh Oblast (1997)
- – Montana (1999)
- – Poitou-Charentes (2002)
- – Surat Thani Province (2004)
- – Cebu (2010)
- – Iloilo (2010)
- – Podkarpackie (2015)
- – Perlis (2023)

== See also ==
- Major national historical and cultural sites in Guangxi
- List of twin towns and sister cities in China
- Chinese landing helicopter dock Guangxi
