= Liu Jianxun =

Chinese politician

Liu Jianxun (Chinese: 刘建勋) (1913 – April 23, 1983) was a Chinese politician. He was twice Chinese Communist Party Committee Secretary of Henan (1961–1966, 1971–1978), governor of Henan (1968–1978) and CCP Committee Secretary of Guangxi (1957–1961). Born in Hebei, he was a delegate to the 5th National People's Congress.

Preceded by Chen Manyuan	Party Secretary of Guangxi; 1957–1961	Succeeded by Wei Guoqing
Preceded by Wen Minsheng	Governor of Henan; 1968–1978	Succeeded by Duan Junyi
Preceded by Wu Zhipu	Party Secretary of Henan; 1961–1966	Succeeded by Wen Minsheng
Preceded by Wen Minsheng	Party Secretary of Henan; 1971–1978	Succeeded by Duan Junyi
