= Gui-Liu Mandarin =

Southwestern Mandarin dialects

Gui–Liu Mandarin
- Region: northern Guangxi, southwestern Hunan, southern Guizhou
- Speakers: 30.07 million (2012)
- Language family: Sino-Tibetan: Sinitic; Chinese; Mandarin; Southwestern Mandarin; Gui–Liu Mandarin

Language codes
- ISO 639-3: –
- Glottolog: None

Gui–Liu Mandarin (simplified Chinese: 桂柳官话; traditional Chinese: 桂柳官話) is a group of Southwestern Mandarin varieties spoken predominantly in the Guangxi Zhuang Autonomous Region. It is named after the cities of Guilin and Liuzhou, two main cities in the northeast of the province. The second edition of The Language Atlas of China divides the group into three subbranches, namely Xiangnan (Chinese: 湘南小片), Guibei (Chinese: 桂北小片), and Qiannan (Chinese: 黔南小片), of which Guibei is spoken in the highest number of counties.

== Phonology ==
=== Initials ===
The initial system of Guiliu varieties are rather heterogenous from each other yet nonetheless still share notably characteristics. A harmonised initial system of Guilin and Liuzhou Mandarin is shown below. Sounds which only occur in Liuzhou are shown in red.

Initial consonants
		Labial	Dental/ Alveolar	Palatal	Velar	Glottal
Nasal		m	n		ŋ	
Plosive	plain	p	t		k	
Plosive	aspirated	pʰ	tʰ		kʰ	
Affricate	plain		ts	tɕ		
Affricate	aspirated		tsʰ	tɕʰ		
Fricative		f	s	ɕ		h
Approximant			l (Note: In Guilin this sound has merged with /n/.)			

==== Common features ====
- Guiliu Mandarin generally follows the devoicing pattern of Middle Chinese voiced obstruents of other Mandarin varieties. In the 平 píng tone, they become aspirated stops but in the 仄 zé tones, they become unaspirated: 皮: Guilin /pʰi²¹/, Liuzhou /pʰi³¹/ but 辦: Guilin /pã²⁴/, Liuzhou /pã²⁴/.
- The 日 rì initial has generally been lost or have become an initial palatal glide [j-]: 人: Guilin /in²¹/, Liuzhou /in³¹/; 讓: Guilin /iaŋ²⁴/, Liuzhou /iaŋ²⁴/.
- The 疑 yí initial has mostly been preserved in non-palatal syllables as /ŋ/: 我 Guilin /ŋo⁵³/, Liuzhou /ŋo⁵⁴/.

==== Internal variation ====
===== Loss of retroflex consonants =====
Like other Southwestern Mandarin, most Guiliu varieties have lost their retroflex consonants. The main exception is the Baishi variety which retains them as /tʃ/, /tʃʰ/ and /ʃ/. Amongst the varieties which do not retain retroflexes as distinct consonants, Guilin universally converts old retroflexes into alveolar sibilants. Liuzhou mostly converts them into alveolars but before /y/ (which becomes /u/ in Guilin à la Standard Mandarin in this context), they become alveolar-palatals.

	Beijing	Guilin	Liuzhou
茶	chá /tʂʰa³⁵/	tsʰa²¹	tsʰa³¹
主	zhǔ /tʂu²¹⁴/	tsu⁵³	tɕy⁵⁴

===== Palatalisation =====
The degree to which palatalisation operates within Gui-Liu varieties is subject to variation between varieties. Some varieties, Lipu and Baishi, completely lack palatalisation of any form. In Liuzhou, palatalisation mainly operates on alveolar sibilants before [i] and [y] except with the rhymes /in/, /ie/ and /iẽ/. As for Guilin Mandarin, it palatalises both velar consonants and alveolar sibilants before all instances of a palatal element. The situation is summarised in the following table where cells in which palatalisation has occurred are coloured yellow:

		Guilin	Xincheng	Liuzhou	Lipu and Baishi
Before /i/, /y/ except the rhymes /in/, /ie/, /iẽ/	*ts	tɕ	tɕ	tɕ	ts
Before /i/, /y/ except the rhymes /in/, /ie/, /iẽ/	*tsʰ	tɕʰ	tɕʰ	tɕʰ	tsʰ
Before /i/, /y/ except the rhymes /in/, /ie/, /iẽ/	*s	ɕ	ɕ	ɕ	s
Before /i/, /y/ except the rhymes /in/, /ie/, /iẽ/	*k	tɕ	c	k	k
Before /i/, /y/ except the rhymes /in/, /ie/, /iẽ/	*kʰ	tɕʰ	cʰ	kʰ	kʰ
Before /i/, /y/ except the rhymes /in/, /ie/, /iẽ/	*x	ɕ	ç	h	h
/in/, /ie/ and /iẽ/	*ts	tɕ	tɕ	ts	ts
/in/, /ie/ and /iẽ/	*tsʰ	tɕʰ	tɕʰ	tsʰ	tsʰ
/in/, /ie/ and /iẽ/	*s	ɕ	ɕ	s	s
/in/, /ie/ and /iẽ/	*k	tɕ	c	k	k
/in/, /ie/ and /iẽ/	*kʰ	tɕʰ	cʰ	kʰ	kʰ
/in/, /ie/ and /iẽ/	*x	ɕ	ç	h	h

=== Rhymes ===
Shown below is a harmonised list of rhymes between Guilin and Liuzhou Mandarin. Those which only occur in Guilin are in light blue where as those which only occur in Liuzhou are in green.

Finals
Medial	Nucleus																					
Medial	∅	a	o	e	ə	æ	ɑ	ɛi	ɐi	əu	ɐu	u	ã	ẽ	ɐn	ən	aŋ	oŋ	aʔ (Note: Only found in a small number of words, otherwise this tone has merged into 陽平)	oʔ	eʔ	ŋ
∅	ɿ (Note: Does not occur in Lipu and Baishi)	a	o	e	ə	æ	ɑ	ɛi	ɐi	əu	ɐu		ã	ẽ	ɐn	ən	aŋ	oŋ	aʔ	oʔ	eʔ	ŋ
i	i	ia	io	ie			iɑ			iəu	iɐu	iu		iẽ		i(ə)n	iaŋ	ioŋ				
u	u	ua				uæ		uɛi	uɐi				uã		uɐn	uən	uaŋ		uaʔ			
y	y			ye								yu		yẽ		y(ə)n						

==== Common features ====
- Monophthongisation of historical diphthongs *ai and *au to /æ~ɛ/ and /ɑ~ɔ/ has occurred in many varieties.
- Nasalisation of historic coda /n/ has occurred after /a/ and /e/ in many varieties.
- Loss of the distinction between coda /n/ and /ŋ/ (with them becoming complementary to each other) has occurred in many varieties.

=== Tones ===
Most Guiliu varieties distinguish four tones, corresponding mostly to the four tones of Standard Mandarin. However, some varieties may preserve a distinct tone reflecting old checked, or stop coda, syllables. In Liuzhou this tone is mostly vestigial but it remains robust in varieties such as Baishi. In all other varieties, this tone has merged into the Light level tone.

Tones
Category	Guilin	Liuzhou	Lipu	Baishi
Dark level (陰平)	33	44	44	44
Light level (陽平)	21	31	21	21
Rising (上聲)	53	54	54	54
Departing (去聲)	24	24	35	23
Checked (入聲)	Merged into 陽平	(ʔ5)	Merged into 陽平	213
