= He River =

River in Guangxi and Guangdong, China

Coordinates: 23°25′55″N 111°29′54″E

- Traditional Chinese: 賀江
- Simplified Chinese: 贺江
Transcriptions
Standard Mandarin
- Hanyu Pinyin: Hè Jiāng
- Wade–Giles: Ho River

The He River is a tributary of the Xi River in Guangxi and Guangdong provinces in China.
