= Chen Manyuan =

Chinese politician

Chen Manyuan (Chinese: 陈漫远) (December 1911 – November 22, 1986) was a People's Republic of China politician. He was the 2nd Chinese Communist Party Committee Secretary of Guangxi (1957) as well as chairman of Guangxi (1953–1958). He was a member of the Central Advisory Commission and the 1st Chinese People's Political Consultative Conference. He was a delegate to the 1st National People's Congress and 3rd National People's Congress.

Preceded by Zhang Yunyi	Communist Party Chief of Guangxi; 1957	Succeeded by Liu Jianxun
Preceded by Zhang Yunyi	Chairman of Guangxi; 1953–1958	Succeeded by Wei Guoqing
