= Qiao Xiaoguang =

Chinese politician and diplomat

- 乔晓光

Party Secretary of Guangxi
- In office February 1977 – June 1985
- Preceded by: An Pingsheng
- Succeeded by: Chen Huiguang

Director of the Revolutionary Committee of Guangxi Zhuang Autonomous Region
- In office February 1977 – December 1979
- Preceded by: An Pingsheng
- Succeeded by: Qin Yingji

First Secretary of Guangxi
- In office 1961–1970
- Preceded by: Wei Guoqing
- Succeeded by: Wei Guoqing

Chinese Ambassador to North Korea
- In office 1955–1961
- Premier: Zhou Enlai
- Preceded by: Pan Zili
- Succeeded by: Hao Deqing

Personal details
- Born: 1918 Guangzong County, Hebei, China
- Died: 2003 (aged 84–85) Beijing, China
- Party: Chinese Communist Party

Chinese name
- Simplified Chinese: 乔晓光
- Traditional Chinese: 喬曉光
Transcriptions
Standard Mandarin
- Hanyu Pinyin: Qiáo Xiǎoguāng

Wang Kekui
- Chinese: 王克奎
Transcriptions
Standard Mandarin
- Hanyu Pinyin: Wáng Kèkuí

Qiao Xiaoguang (Chinese: 乔晓光; 1918–10 June 2003) was a People's Republic of China politician and diplomat. He was the Chinese Ambassador to North Korea (1955–1961). He was born in Guangzong County, Hebei. He was twice Chinese Communist Party Committee Secretary of Guangxi (1966–1967, 1977–1985) and chairman of Guangxi (1977–1979). He was a delegate to the 4th and 5th National People's Congress and a member of the 11th and 12th Central Committee of the Chinese Communist Party.

Diplomatic posts
Preceded by Pan Zili	Chinese Ambassador to North Korea; 1955–1961	Succeeded by Hao Deqing
Party political offices
Preceded by Wei Guoqing	Party Secretary of Guangxi; 1966–1967	Succeeded by Wei Guoqing
Preceded by An Pingsheng	Party Secretary of Guangxi; 1977–1985	Succeeded by Chen Huiguang
Government offices
Preceded by An Pingsheng	Director of the Revolutionary Committee of Guangxi Zhuang Autonomous Region; 1977–1979	Succeeded by Tan Yingji
