= An Pingsheng =

Chinese politician

- Born: 1917
- Died: 1999 (aged 81–82)
- Other name: 安平生
- Occupation: politician

An Pingsheng (Chinese: 安平生) (1917–1999) was a Chinese politician. He was governor of Guangxi (1975–1977) and secretary of the Guangxi Zhuang Autonomous Regional Committee of the Chinese Communist Party (1975–1977). Born in Xi'an, Shaanxi, An was governor of Yunnan as well as Chinese Communist Party Committee Secretary. He was a delegate to the 5th National People's Congress.

Preceded by Wei Guoqing	Communist Party Chief and Chairmen of Guangxi; 1975–1977	Succeeded by Qiao Xiaoguang
Preceded by Jia Qiyun	Party Secretary of Yunnan	Succeeded by Pu Chaozhu
Preceded by Jia Qiyun	Governor of Yunnan	Succeeded by Liu Minghui
