= Cao Bochun =

Chinese politician

Cao Bochun (Chinese: 曹伯纯; born November 1941) is a politician of the People's Republic of China. He was the secretary of CCP Guangxi committee, and currently serves as vice director of environment and resources protection committee of 11th National People's Congress.

Born in Zhuzhou, Hunan Province, Cao graduated from aeronautic engineering school in Zhuzhou in December 1963, and stayed as a teacher in the school. He joined the Chinese Communist Party (CCP) in December 1966. In the early-1970s, the school was transformed into a branch of Jiangnan Aeronautic Engine Factory (National 331 Factory), and he became a worker and technician. He was eventually promoted to vice head of the factory. In 1983, he was appointed as vice secretary of the CCP Zhuzhou municipal committee and director of Publicity Department. He became the secretary of the CCP Zhuzhou committee in 1984. He later served as secretary of CCP Xiangtan municipal committee, and vice governor of Hunan Province. In June 1992, he became the vice secretary of the CCP Liaoning committee. From June 1992 to 1995, he was the secretary of the CCP Dalian municipal committee. In July 1997, he was appointed as secretary of CCP committee of Guangxi Zhuang Autonomous Region, and was re-elected in October 2001. On January 31, 2002, he was elected as chairman of Guangxi People's Congress, and was re-elected in January 2003. He retired in 2006, and was appointed as vice director of environment and resources protection committee of National People's Congress on 29 June 2006 and was re-elected in March 2008.

Cao was an alternate member of 14th Central Committee of the Chinese Communist Party, and a full member of 15th and 16th Central Committees of the CCP. He is a standing committee member of 11th National People's Congress.
