= Qin Yingji =

Chinese politician

Qin Yingji (Chinese: 覃应机) (1915–1992) was a People's Republic of China politician. He was born in Sanshi, Donglan County, Guangxi. He was the Chairman of Guangxi. He was a member of the Zhuang ethnic group.

Preceded by Qiao Xiaoguang	Chairman of Guangxi	Succeeded by Wei Chunshu
