= Guangxi Zhuang Autonomous Regional Committee of the Chinese Communist Party =

Guangxi Zhuang Autonomous Regional Committee of the Chinese Communist Party 中国共产党广西壮族自治区委员会 Cunghgoz Gungcanjdangj Gvangjsih Bouxcuengh Swcigih Veijyenzvei

Overview
- Type: Highest decision-making organ when Guangxi Zhuang Autonomous Regional Congress is not in session.
- Elected by: Guangxi Zhuang Autonomous Regional Congress
- Length of term: Five years
- Term limits: None
- First convocation: 22 September 1949

Leadership
- Secretary: Chen Gang
- Deputy Secretary: Wei Tao (Acting Government Chairman); Wang Weiping
- Secretary-General: Zhou Yijue
- Executive organ: Standing Committee
- Inspection organ: Commission for Discipline Inspection

Guangxi Zhuang Autonomous Regional Committee of the Chinese Communist Party
- Simplified Chinese: 中国共产党广西壮族自治区委员会
- Traditional Chinese: 中國共產黨廣西壯族自治區委員會
Transcriptions
Standard Mandarin
- Hanyu Pinyin: Zhōngguó Gòngchǎndǎng Guǎngxī zhuàngzú zìzhìqū Wěiyuánhuì

Abbreviation
- Simplified Chinese: 中共广西壮族自治区委
- Traditional Chinese: 中共廣西壯族自治區委
- Literal meaning: CCP Guangxi Zhuang Autonomous Regional Committee
Transcriptions
Standard Mandarin
- Hanyu Pinyin: Zhōnggòng Guǎngxī zhuàngzú zìzhìqū Wěi

The Guangxi Zhuang Autonomous Regional Committee of the Chinese Communist Party is the regional committee of the Chinese Communist Party (CCP) in the Guangxi Zhuang Autonomous Region. The CCP committee secretary is the highest ranking post in the region. The current secretary is Chen Gang, who succeeded Liu Ning on 31 December 2024.

== History ==
On 22 September 1949, the CCP Central Committee decided to establish the Guangxi Provincial Committee of the CCP. In 1958, after the province was turned to the Guangxi Tong Autonomous Region, the committee was renamed. In 1965, the autonomous region was renamed to the Guangxi Zhuang Autonomous Region, and the committee assumed its current name.

== Organization ==
The organization of the CCP Guangxi Committee includes:

- General Office

=== Functional Departments ===
- Organization Department
- Publicity Department
- United Front Work Department
- Political and Legal Affairs Commission

=== Offices ===
- Policy Research Office
- Office of the Cyberspace Affairs Commission
- Office of the Institutional Organization Commission
- Office of the Military-civilian Fusion Development Committee
- Taiwan Work Office
- Office of the Leading Group for Inspection Work
- Letters and Calls Bureau

=== Dispatched institutions ===
- Working Committee of the Organs Directly Affiliated to the Guangxi Regional Committee

=== Organizations directly under the Committee ===
- Guangxi Party School
- Guangxi Daily
- Guangxi Institute of Socialism
- Party History Research Office
- Guangxi Regional Archives

== Leadership ==
=== Party Committees ===
10th Committee of the Autonomous Region (November 2011–November 2016)

- Secretary: Guo Shengkun (–December 2012), Peng Qinghua (December 2012–)
- Deputy Secretaries: Ma Biao (Zhuang) (–March 2013), Wei Chao'an (–January 2016), Chen Wu (Zhuang) (April 2013–), Li Ke (Zhuang) (April 2016–November 2016), Hou Jianguo (November 2016–)
- Standing Committee Members: Guo Shengkun (–December 2012), Ma Biao (Zhuang) (–March 2013), Wei Chao'an (–January 2016), Long Yihe (–June 2014), Shen Beihai (–April 2015), Wen Kahua (Zhuang), Chen Wu (Zhuang), Shi Shengleng (Manchu) (–January 2014), Huang Daowei, Lin Nianxiu (–March 2014), Yu Yuanhui (Yao) (–May 2015; investigated for serious disciplinary violations), Zhou Xinjian (–April 2015), Fan Xiaoli (female, Hui), Peng Qinghua (December 2012–), Wang Xiaodong (December 2013–), Deng Weiping (January 2014–March 2015), Tang Renjian (April 2014–July 2016), Bai Nianfa (June 2014–), Yu Chunsheng (March 2015–), Lan Tianli (Zhuang) (April 2015–), Yu Yunlin (April 2015–), Li Kang (female, Zhuang) (November 2015–), Li Ke (Zhuang) (April 2016–November 2016), Wang Ke (June 2016–), Hou Jianguo (November 2016–)

11th Regional Party Committee (November 2016 – November 2021)

- Secretary: Peng Qinghua (until 21 March 2018), Lu Xinshe (21 March 2018 – 18 October 2021), Liu Ning (from 18 October 2021)
- Deputy Secretaries: Chen Wu (until October 2020), Hou Jianguo (until May 2017), Sun Dawei (June 2017 – January 2021), Lan Tianli (from October 2020), Liu Xiaoming (from March 2021)
- Other Standing Committee members: Fan Xiaoli, Yu Chunsheng (until September 2017), Wang Xiaodong, Yu Yunlin (until March 2018), Wang Ke (until August 2018), Huang Shiyong, Wang Kai (until March 2017), Zhao Deming (until May 2018), Mo Gongming (June 2017 – January 2018), Fang Lingmin (from September 2017), Jiang Yingyu (January 2018 – June 2020), Qin Rupei (from January 2018), Lu Xinshe (March 2018 – October 2021), Xu Shaochuan (from March 2018), Huang Weijing (from May 2018), Yan Zhichan (July 2018 – March 2020), Zeng Wanming (November 2018 – August 2021), He Renxue (from June 2020), Zeng Xin (from June 2020), Wang Weiping (from August 2021), Xu Hairong (from October 2021), He Wenhao (from October 2021)

12th Regional Party Committee (November 2021–)

- Secretary: Liu Ning (until December 2024), Chen Gang
- Deputy Secretaries: Lan Tianli (until May 2025), Liu Xiaoming (until March 2023), Wang Weiping (since September 2024), Wei Tao (since July 2025)
- Other Standing Committee members: Xu Hairong (until April 2022), He Wenhao, Fang Lingmin, He Renxue, Wang Weiping, Cai Lixin, Nong Shengwen, Xu Yongqian, Sun Daguang (until March 2023), Zhou Yijue, Wang Xinfu (from April 2022), Chen Yijun (from May 2023), Zhuang Ge (May 2024–), Miao Qingwang (July 2024–), Lu Xinning (August 2024–), Chen Gang (December 2024–), Wei Tao (Zhuang ethnicity; July 2025–), Tan Pichuang (September 2025–)

== See also ==
- Politics of Guangxi
