= Chairman of Guangxi =

Chairman of the Guangxi Zhuang Autonomous Region People's Government
- 广西壮族自治区人民政府主席
- National Emblem of China

- Flag of China
- Incumbent; Wei Tao since 3 July 2025
- People's Government of the Guangxi Zhuang Autonomous Region
- Type: Head of government
- Status: Provincial and ministerial-level official
- Reports to: Guangxi Zhuang Autonomous Region People's Congress and its Standing Committee
- Nominator: Presidium of the Guangxi Zhuang Autonomous Region People's Congress
- Appointer: Guangxi Zhuang Autonomous Region People's Congress
- Term length: Five years, renewable
- Inaugural holder: Zhang Yunyi
- Formation: December 1949
- Deputy: Deputy Chairperson; Secretary-General

The Chairperson of the Guangxi Zhuang Autonomous Region People's Government is the head of the Guangxi Zhuang Autonomous Region and leader of the People's Government of the Guangxi Zhuang Autonomous Region.

The chairperson is elected by the People's Congress of the Guangxi Zhuang Autonomous Region, and responsible to it and its Standing Committee. The chairperson is a provincial level official and is responsible for the overall decision-making of the regional government. The chairperson is assisted by an executive vice chairperson as well as several vice chairpersons. The chairperson generally serves as the deputy secretary of the Guangxi Zhuang Autonomous Regional Committee of the Chinese Communist Party and as a member of the CCP Central Committee. The chairperson the second-highest-ranking official in the province after the secretary of the CCP Guangxi Committee. The government chairman is always a Zhuang. The current acting chairperson is Wei Tao, who took office on 3 July 2025.

== List ==
=== People's Republic of China ===
No.	Officeholder	Term of office		Party	Ref.
No.	Officeholder	Took office	Left office	Party	Ref.
Chairman of the Guangxi Provincial People's Government
1	Zhang Yunyi (1892–1974)	December 1949	March 1954	Chinese Communist Party	
Governor of the Guangxi Provincial People's Committee
2	Wei Guoqing (1913–1989)	March 1954	August 1958	Chinese Communist Party	
Chairman of the Guangxi Zhuang Autonomous Region People's Committee
2	Wei Guoqing (1913–1989)	August 1958	August 1968	Chinese Communist Party	
Chairman of the Guangxi Zhuang Autonomous Region Revolutionary Committee
2	Wei Guoqing (1913–1989)	August 1968	October 1975	Chinese Communist Party	
3	An Pingsheng (1917–1999)	October 1975	February 1977	Chinese Communist Party	
4	Qiao Xiaoguang (1918–2003)	February 1977	December 1979	Chinese Communist Party	
Chairman of the Guangxi Zhuang Autonomous Region People's Government
5	Qin Yingji (1915–1992)	December 1979	April 1983	Chinese Communist Party	
6	Wei Chunshu (1922–2016)	April 1983	January 1990	Chinese Communist Party	
7	Cheng Kejie (1933–2000)	January 1990	January 1998	Chinese Communist Party	
8	Li Zhaozhuo (born 1944)	17 January 1998	2 April 2003	Chinese Communist Party	
9	Lu Bing (born 1944)	2 April 2003	28 December 2007	Chinese Communist Party	
10	Ma Biao (born 1954)	26 January 2008	28 March 2013	Chinese Communist Party	
11	Chen Wu (1954–2026)	28 March 2013	19 October 2020	Chinese Communist Party	
12	Lan Tianli (born 1962)	19 October 2020	29 May 2025 (Note: Suspended since 16 May 2025. Resignation accepted by Standing Committee of Guangxi Regional People's Congress on 29 May 2025)	Chinese Communist Party	
—	Vacant (Note: Executive Vice Chairman Xu Yongke presided over government work since 16 May 2025)				
13	Wei Tao (born 1970)	3 July 2025	Incumbent	Chinese Communist Party	
