= Cheng Kejie =

Chinese politician executed for corruption

Cheng Kejie Cingz Klez Gyez
- 成克杰

Vice Chairman of the Standing Committee of the National People's Congress
- In office 16 March 1998 – 21 April 2000
- Chairman: Li Peng

Chairman of Guangxi
- In office January 1993 – January 1998
- Preceded by: Wei Chunshu
- Succeeded by: Li Zhaozhuo

Personal details
- Born: 13 November 1933 Shanglin County, Guangxi, China
- Died: 14 September 2000 (aged 66) Beijing
- Party: Chinese Communist Party (1954–2000, expelled)
- Education: Northern Jiaotong University

Cheng Kejie (Chinese: 成克杰; 13 November 1933 – 14 September 2000) was a Chinese politician. He held the position of Chairman of the People's Government of the Guangxi Zhuang Autonomous Region and vice-chairman of the Standing Committee of the National People's Congress. Cheng was executed for accepting bribes. He remains the only party and state leader to be sentenced to death and executed to date.

== Biography ==
=== Guangxi ===
Cheng was born in Guangxi, and joined the Chinese Communist Party (CCP) in February 1954. Since graduating in 1957 from the Railway Management Department of the Beijing Railway Institute (now Beijing Jiaotong University), Cheng Kejie has held various positions, including technician at Zhanjiang Station of the Liuzhou Railway Bureau, business instructor at the Zhanjiang Office, technician, engineer, chief engineer, deputy director (1984–1985), and director (1985–1986) at the Nanning Branch. Two years later, he was promoted to vice-chairman of the People's Government of the Guangxi Zhuang Autonomous Region. In 1989, he became the deputy secretary of the CCP Guangxi Zhuang Autonomous Region Committee, and the following year, he was elevated to Chairman of the People's Government of the Guangxi Zhuang Autonomous Region, serving as Acting Chairman prior to April 28, 1990. During his leadership, Guangxi organized the Fourth Ethnic Minority Traditional Sports Games in 1991.

=== National People's Congress ===
In 1992, Cheng Kejie was appointed to the 14th Central Committee of the Chinese Communist Party, and in March 1998, during the inaugural session of the 9th National People's Congress, he was elected as vice-chairman of the Standing Committee of the National People's Congress.

=== Corruption ===
In January 1999, Yu Fanglin, the secretary of the CCP Yulin Committee, disclosed to the case officer during his detention that Cheng Kejie, while serving as chairman of the Guangxi Zhuang Autonomous Region, had twice directed Yu Fanglin to procure 7,000 tons of sugar from Guigang Sugar Factory (Chinese: 贵港糖厂) at a reduced price for resale, thereby generating a significant profit. In August of that year, the Central Committee of the Chinese Communist Party resolved to investigate Cheng Kejie, though this decision was not publicly disclosed at the time. Cheng Kejie, Vice Chairman of the National People's Congress Standing Committee, was last publicly reported on August 30, 1999, during the closing day of the eleventh meeting of the Ninth National People's Congress Standing Committee. On October 1, 1999, the celebration for the fiftieth anniversary of the founding of the People's Republic of China took place in Beijing, yet Cheng Kejie was absent from the General Assembly, while Xie Fei, also a vice-chairman, made an appearance despite being seriously ill. Xie Fei died on October 27, shortly after his return to Guangzhou, and Cheng Kejie's name was absent from the reports on the day of his farewell service. This incited conjecture over Cheng Kejie's potential involvement in the case.

In March 2000, Cheng was suspected of legal and disciplinary violations, resulting in his absence from that year's NPC meeting. He was expelled from the CCP on April 20, dismissed from his role as a deputy to the NPC on April 21, and had his vice chairman position revoked on April 25. Subsequently, the Supreme People's Procuratorate (SPP) decided to arrest him. On July 31, Cheng Kejie, accused of accepting bribes exceeding RMB 41.09 million, either independently or in collusion with Li Ping (described as his mistress), was sentenced to death by the Beijing Municipal No. 1 Intermediate People's Court. His subsequent appeal was denied on August 22.

On September 7, the Supreme People's Court authorized the death penalty for Cheng Kejie, who was ultimately executed by lethal injection at 9:53 p.m. on September 14, 2000. He was the first party and state leader in the history of the People's Republic of China to be executed by the judicial authorities.

== See also ==
- Zheng Xiaoyu
