= Huang Ribo =

Chinese biochemist and politician (born 1958)

- 黄日波

Vice Chairperson of the Guangxi Zhuang Autonomous Regional Committee of the Chinese People's Political Consultative Conference
- In office January 2018 – January 2023
- In office January 2008 – September 2013

Vice Chairman of the People's Government of the Guangxi Zhuang Autonomous Region
- In office July 2013 – January 2018

Personal details
- Born: July 1958 (age 68) Jingxi, Guangxi, China
- Party: Independent
- Education: Guangxi Agricultural College; University of Reading
- Occupation: Biochemist, politician

Huang Ribo (Chinese: 黄日波; born July 1958) is a Chinese biochemist and politician, who was served as the vice chairperson of the Guangxi Zhuang Autonomous Regional Committee of the Chinese People's Political Consultative Conference and the vice chairman of the People's Government of the Guangxi Zhuang Autonomous Region.

== Career ==
Huang was born in Jingxi, Guangxi in July 1958. He was enrolled to the agricultural department of Guangxi Agricultural College (now Guangxi University) in 1978 and graduated in 1982. After graduation, he was served as a technician at the Agricultural Technology Extension Station of Chengxiang Town, Napo County. Huang was enrolled to Guangxi Agricultural College again in 1985, and he was enrolled to the University of Reading in 1986.

Huang backed to Guangxi Agricultural College and served as a teacher in 1990. He also served as the director of experimental center from 1997 to 2003, and a professor of School of Life Sciences and Technology of Guangxi University from 2003 to 2007. In 1990, Huang invented a method for the stepwise release of microbial inclusions, which manufactured hyaluronic acid by this method.

Huang also served as the president of the Guangxi Academy of Sciences and vice chairperson of the Guangxi Association for Science and Technology.

In January 2008, Huang was appointed as the vice chairperson of the Guangxi Zhuang Autonomous Regional Committee of the Chinese People's Political Consultative Conference. In July 2013, Huang was appointed as the vice chairman of the People's Government of the Guangxi Zhuang Autonomous Region. He was stepped down the post of vice chairperson of the CPPCC Guangxi Zhuang Autonomous Regional Committee in September 2013.

In January 2018, Huang was re-appointed as the vice chairperson of the Guangxi Zhuang Autonomous Regional Committee of the Chinese People's Political Consultative Conference.

== Investigation ==
On 18 October 2026, Huang was suspected of "serious violations of laws" by the National Supervisory Commission, the highest anti-corruption agency of China.
