= Ma Biao =

Ma Biao may refer to:

- Ma Biao (politician), Communist party politician
- Ma Biao (general), Chinese Muslim Lieutenant-General
