= Gu Chaohao =

Chinese mathematician

- 谷超豪
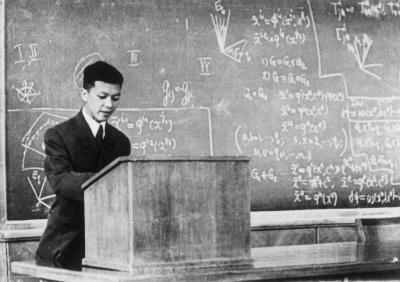
- Gu in 1959
- Born: 15 May 1926; Wenzhou, Zhejiang, Republic of China
- Died: 24 June 2012 (aged 86); Shanghai, People's Republic of China
- Education: Zhejiang University; Moscow State University
- Spouse: Hu Hesheng
- Awards: Highest Science and Technology Award (2009)
- Scientific career
- Fields: Mathematics
- Workplaces: Chinese Academy of Sciences; University of Science and Technology of China

Gu Chaohao (Chinese: 谷超豪; pinyin: Gǔ Chāoháo; Wade–Giles: Ku Ch'aohao; May 15, 1926 – June 24, 2012) was a Chinese mathematician. He graduated from National Chekiang University (Zhejiang University) in 1948, and received a doctorate in physics and mathematical science from Moscow University in 1959. He was primarily engaged in research on partial differential equations, differential geometry, solitons, and mathematical physics. He served as vice president of Fudan University and from 1988 to 1993 as president of the University of Science and Technology of China. In 1980, he was elected an academician of the Chinese Academy of Sciences. He received the Highest Science and Technology Award in 2009.

== Works ==
- Gu Chaohao, Hu H, Zhou Xixiang:Darboux Transformations in Integrable Systems 2005 Springer, ISBN 978-1-4020-3087-1
- Gu Chaohao Ed:Soliton Theory and Its Applications, Springer ISBN 9780387571126
- Differential Geometry and Differential Equations:Proceedings of a Symposium, Shanghai, 1985, Editors: M. Berger, Gu Chaohao, R.L. Bryant, Springer ISBN 9780387178493
- Gu Chaohao, Li Ta-Tsien, Hu Hesheng:Differential Geometry and Related Topics, World Scientific Pub Co, Singapore ISBN 9789812381880
- Gu Chaohao, Li Yishen Ed, Nonlinear Physics: Proceedings of the International Conference, Shanghai, Peoples Rep of China, April 24–30, 1989 Springer, ISBN 0387523898

Educational offices
New title	Dean of Graduate School of Fudan University; 1984–1987	Succeeded by Yang Fujia
Preceded by Teng Teng	President of University of Science and Technology of China; 1988–1993	Succeeded by Tang Honggao
Preceded by Guan Weiyan	Dean of Graduate School of University of Science and Technology of China; 1988–1992	Succeeded by Tang Honggao
New title	President of Wenzhou University; 1999–2006	Succeeded by Chen Fusheng
