= GIET =

GIET may refer to:

- GIET University, formerly Gandhi Institute of Engineering and Technology
- Guilin University of Electronic Technology, formerly Guilin Institute of Electronic Technology (GIET)
