= Zhu Qingshi =

Chinese chemist

- 朱清时

President of the Southern University of Science and Technology
- In office September 2009 – September 2014
- Preceded by: New title
- Succeeded by: Li Ming (acting)

Dean of the Graduate School of the University of Science and Technology of China
- In office June 2000 – April 2001
- Preceded by: Tang Honggao
- Succeeded by: Bai Chunli

President of the University of Science and Technology of China
- In office June 1998 – September 2008
- Preceded by: Tang Honggao
- Succeeded by: Hou Jianguo

Personal details
- Born: 7 February 1946 (age 80) Chengdu, Sichuan, China
- Education: University of Science and Technology of China
- Scientific career
- Fields: Physical chemistry
- Workplaces: University of Science and Technology of China; Southern University of Science and Technology

Chinese name
- Simplified Chinese: 朱清时
- Traditional Chinese: 朱清時
Transcriptions
Standard Mandarin
- Hanyu Pinyin: Zhū Qīngshí

Zhu Qingshi FRSC (Chinese: 朱清时; born 7 February 1946) is a Chinese physical chemist and writer. He is the former president of the University of Science and Technology of China (1998–2008), and the founding president of Southern University of Science and Technology (2009–2014).

Zhu Qingshi was a descendant of the imperial family of the Ming dynasty and the twentieth descendant of Zhu Chun, Prince of Shu, the eleventh son of Zhu Yuanzhang. Zhu Qingshi's family settled in Bailuchang Township, Peng County, after the fall of the Ming, and they are local prominent families.

== Life and career ==
1946. Zhu was born in Chengdu, Sichuan, China.

1963. Graduated from Huaxi Secondary School in Chengdu (originally called Chengdu 13th School), China.

1968. Graduated from the University of Science and Technology of China with a degree in physics.

1991. Elected as an academician of the Chinese Academy of Sciences.

1994. Became chief of its Laboratory of Bond Selective Chemistry.

1996. Appointed Vice-president of the University of Science and Technology of China.

1998. Appointed the President of the University of Science and Technology of China.

== Honours ==
- Academician Chinese Academy of Sciences
- Honorary doctorate, Soka University of Japan
- 1994 Thompson Memorial Award, Spectrochima Actas.

Educational offices
Preceded by Tang Honggao	President of the University of Science and Technology of China; 1998–2008	Succeeded by Hou Jianguo
Preceded by Tang Honggao	Dean of the Graduate School of the University of Science and Technology of China; 2000–2001	Succeeded by Bai Chunli
New title	President of the Southern University of Science and Technology; 2009–2014	Succeeded by Li Ming (acting)
