= Chen Qixue =

Chen Qixue (1512–1593), courtesy name Zongmeng, and art name Xing'an, was a political figure of the Ming Dynasty. He was originally from Xuancheng in the Ningguo Prefecture (now Xuanzhou, Anhui), and his family belonged to the military registry of Dengzhou, Shandong. He served as the Minister of the Ministry of Justice in Nanjing and was posthumously honored with the title "Gongjing" (Respectful and Tranquil).

== Life ==
He ranked third in the provincial examination (xiangshi) of Shandong. In the 23rd year of the Jiajing era (1544), he passed the imperial examination in the Jiachen year (甲辰科) with the 5th place in the third class and became a jinshi (successful candidate). He was appointed as a traveling official, and in June of the 26th year of the Jiajing era (1547), he was selected as an Investigating censor for the Huguang Circuit. He once impeached Lu Bing, an influential official of the Jinyi Guard, for abusing his power. In the 27th year of Jiajing (1548), he served as an inspector overseeing the salt administration in the Lianghuai region.

In February of the 29th year of the Jiajing era (1550), he was promoted to the position of Assistant Inspector of Shaanxi. In the first month of the 32nd year of the Jiajing era (1553), he was promoted to Right Councillor of Yulin. He subsequently held various positions, including Deputy Military Commissioner of Sūzhou and Left Councillor. In the 40th year of Jiajing (1561), in the leap month of May, he was promoted to the Inspector of Shanxi. In July, he was elevated to Right Assistant Imperial Censor and Governor of Datong. In the 42nd year of Jiajing (1563), in May, he was promoted to Right Deputy Imperial Censor and Governor of Shaanxi. In the 44th year of Jiajing (1565), in April, he was reassigned to the position of Deputy Imperial Censor and Governor overseeing Nanjing's grain reserves. In the following year, in March, he was promoted to Right Vice Minister of the Ministry of Revenue, and in April, he became Left Vice Minister of the Ministry of War, overseeing the military affairs of the three borders of Shaanxi, where he successfully suppressed the rebellion of Qiu Fu. In October of the 45th year of Jiajing (1566), after three years of evaluation, he was promoted to Right Imperial Censor in the Court of Censors, continuing as Left Vice Minister of the Ministry of War and maintaining his position as Governor.

In the first year of the Longqing era (1567), in April, he was dismissed from his post and returned to his hometown. In the same year, in winter, he was called back to resume his position as Governor of Xuan-Datong in Shanxi. In the first month of the fourth year, following a memorial from the Censor Zhang Lu, he was ordered to return home and wait for further orders. In May, he resumed his original post overseeing the Shenji Camp. In October, he was appointed as the Minister of the Ministry of Justice in Nanjing. He retired in August of the fifth year, returning to his hometown.

He died at the age of 82 and was posthumously honored with the title "Gongjing" (Respectful and Tranquil).

== Family ==
His great-grandfather was Chen An, a seventh-rank official. His grandfather was Chen Shan, posthumously honored as the Director of the Imperial Rites. His father, Chen Ding, served as the Prefect of Ying Tian (Nanjing). His biological mother was Lady Wang, and his stepmother was also Lady Wang. He had older brothers Chen Qike and Chen Qiyu, who were both graduates of the imperial examination. His younger brothers were Chen Qili and Chen Qiju.
