= Yan Jici =

Chinese physicist (1901–1996)

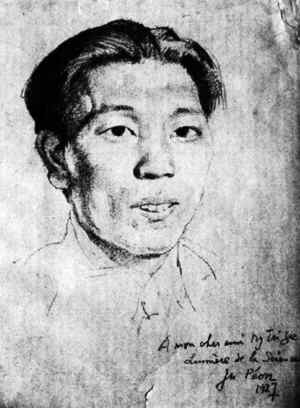
- Sketch of Yan Jici by Xu Beihong (1927)
- Traditional Chinese: 嚴濟慈
- Simplified Chinese: 严济慈
Transcriptions
Standard Mandarin
- Hanyu Pinyin: Yán Jìcí
- Wade–Giles: Yen^{2} Chi^{4}-tz'ŭ^{2}
- IPA: [jɛ̌n tɕî.tsʰɨ̌]
Wu
- Suzhounese: Gnie^{2} Tsi^{5}-zy^{2}

Yan Jici (Chinese: 严济慈; Wade–Giles: Yen Chi-tz'u; 23 January 1901 – 2 November 1996), also commonly known as Ny Tsi-ze, was a Chinese physicist and politician who is considered a founder of modern physics in China. He was a founding member of Academia Sinica in 1948 and of the Chinese Academy of Sciences (CAS) in 1955. He served as founding director of the CAS Institute of Physics and the second president of the University of Science and Technology of China (1980–1984).

In politics, he was a delegate to seven consecutive National People's Congresses (1st to 7th), and served as Vice Chairperson of the National People's Congress from 1983 to 1993.

== Early and education ==
Yan was born in Dongyang, Zhejiang, China on 23 January 1901. After graduating from the National Southeast University in Nanjing in 1923, he went abroad to study at the University of Paris in France. He earned his master's degree in mathematics and physics in 1925, and his Ph.D. in natural science in 1927. His Ph.D. dissertation was on the "deformation and change of optical properties of quartz in an electrical field", with Charles Fabry as his advisor. As the first Chinese to earn a doctoral degree in France, he became famous in both France and China.

== Career ==
=== Republic of China ===
After returning to China, Yan became Dean of the School of Sciences and Engineering at Jinan University (then located in Shanghai). He also taught at Utopia University in Shanghai and the National Central University and Southeast University in Nanjing. At the end of 1928, he went to Paris again and worked in the lab of Marie Curie for a period. In 1935, he was elected a member of the Société Française de Physique together with Frédéric Joliot-Curie. On Yan's recommendation, Qian Sanqiang later studied with Joliot-Curie and became one of China's foremost nuclear physicists.

Yan returned to China again in 1930, and soon afterwards became the founding director of the Institute of Physics of the National Peiping Academy in Beiping (now Beijing). In 1932, Yan, Li Shu-hua, Ye Qisun and others co-founded the Chinese Physical Society. As such, he is considered a founder of modern physics in China. Most of Yan's scientific research was conducted during the Beiping years. He published more than 50 papers in international scientific journals, before his career was interrupted by war.

When the Second Sino-Japanese War broke out in 1937 and Beiping came under Japanese attack, Yan organized the arduous relocation of the Institute of Physics to Kunming in southwest China. More than half of the equipment, books, and documents were lost. To aid the war effort, he shifted the institute's focus to optics research and production, as optical equipment was much needed in military communication and medical instruments. Under his leadership and aided by Qian Linzhao, the institute manufactured hundreds of high-powered microscopes, crystal oscillators, military rangefinders and telescopes, and other equipment. After the end of the war, he was awarded the Third Class Star Medal by the Republic of China government in 1946.

In 1948, he was elected a founding member of Academia Sinica and Chairman of the Chinese Physical Society.

=== People's Republic of China ===
After the founding of the People's Republic of China in 1949, Yan was instrumental in the establishment of the Chinese Academy of Sciences (CAS). He was Founding Director of the CAS Institute of Physics, Vice President of the CAS and President of its Northeast China Branch. He also served as Editor-in-Chief of two major journals Science Bulletin and Science in China (中国科学). In 1955, he was elected a founding member of the CAS.

Yan was a member of the founding committee of the University of Science and Technology of China (USTC), and was appointed Vice President of the university in 1961. After the death of Guo Moruo, he served as the second President of USTC from 1980 to 1984, and President Emeritus afterwards.

Yan was a delegate to the 1st to 7th National People's Congress, serving from 1954 to 1993. From 1983, he served as Vice Chairman of the 6th and 7th Congress for ten years. He was also Honorary Chairman of the Jiusan Society.

== Family ==
Yan was married to Zhang Zongying (张宗英), the daughter of the prominent educator Zhang Heling (张鹤龄). She was one of the first female students at Southeast University. They were engaged in 1923 and married in 1927.

Yan and his wife had eight children: seventh sons and a daughter. The third, seventh (the only daughter), and eighth died in infancy, and the five surviving sons all became academics. The eldest son, Yan Youguang (严又光), was the main designer of China's first digital computer. The second son, Yan Shuangguang (严双光), was an aircraft designer who was beaten to death during the Cultural Revolution. The fourth, Yan Siguang (严四光), was a distinguished researcher at the Chinese Academy of Social Sciences. The fifth, Yan Wuguang (严武光), is a professor at the CAS Institute of High Energy Physics. The sixth, Yan Luguang, is an academician of the CAS and former President of Ningbo University. The Yan family has been called the "little academy of science".

== Death and legacy ==
Yan died in Beijing on 2 November 1996, aged 95. In 1998, the fortieth anniversary of the establishment of the USTC, the university erected a bronze statue of him on its west campus. In 2012, Chinese scientists named a newly discovered minor planet as 10611 Yanjici in his memory.

Academic offices
Preceded by Guo Moruo; Vacant since 1978	President of the University of Science and Technology of China; 1980–1984	Succeeded by Guan Weiyan
