= Zhengzhou No.47 Middle School =

Middle school considered to be the youngest and most famous school of Zhengzhou

Zhengzhou No. 47 Middle School (郑州市 第四十七 中学 Zhèng-zhōu-shì dì-sì-shí-qī zhōng-xué) is a secondary school in Zhengzhou, the capital city of Henan Province, China.

Zhengzhou No. 47 Middle School was founded in 1996 when it had its first intake of junior middle school students only. In August 1997, it had its first intake of senior high school students and became a secondary school with both junior and senior students.

After undergoing an evaluation between 25 September 2002 and 18 June, it was awarded the label of exemplar senior high school in July 2003.

In 2002, the first batch of students who studied in both junior and senior middle schools in Zhengzhou No. 47 Middle School graduated. Among these students, one entered Beijing University, one Qinghua University and one University of Science and Technology of China. This was regarded as a huge success for the school.
