= Night-vision contact lens =

Type of soft contact lens

Night vision contact lens
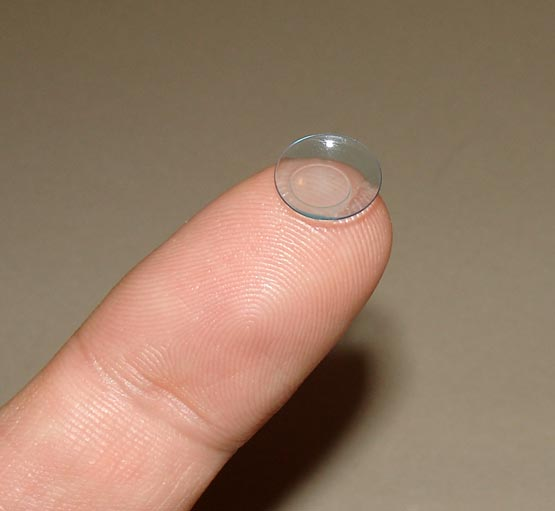
- This is an image of a contact lens that is not the same as the one the article is about, it is only meant to serve as a representation.
- Type: Contact lens
- Inventor: University of Science and Technology of China and other universities in Japan and USA
- Manufacturer: University of Science and Technology of China
- Available: No

A night-vision contact lens, also known as an infrared-converting contact lens, is a type of soft contact lens that uses nanoparticles to convert near-infrared light into visible light allowing partial vision in low light conditions.

== Mechanism of operation ==
This contact lens uses nanoparticles. Nanoparticles in this contact lens absorb infrared light and convert it into light that is in the 400–700nm range(visible light) allowing it to convert near-infrared light(800–1600 nm wavelength) into visible light.

== Effectiveness ==
Images formed are blurry and disturbed as the infrared light is converted into visible light at the surface of the lens which disturbs the image upon entering the eye and in the light is also scattered by the nano particles. It is currently in its early stages and is still being developed.
