= St. Paul's Church, Gunupur =

Catholic church in Gunupur, Odisha, India

Coordinates: 19.082036°N 83.812329°E

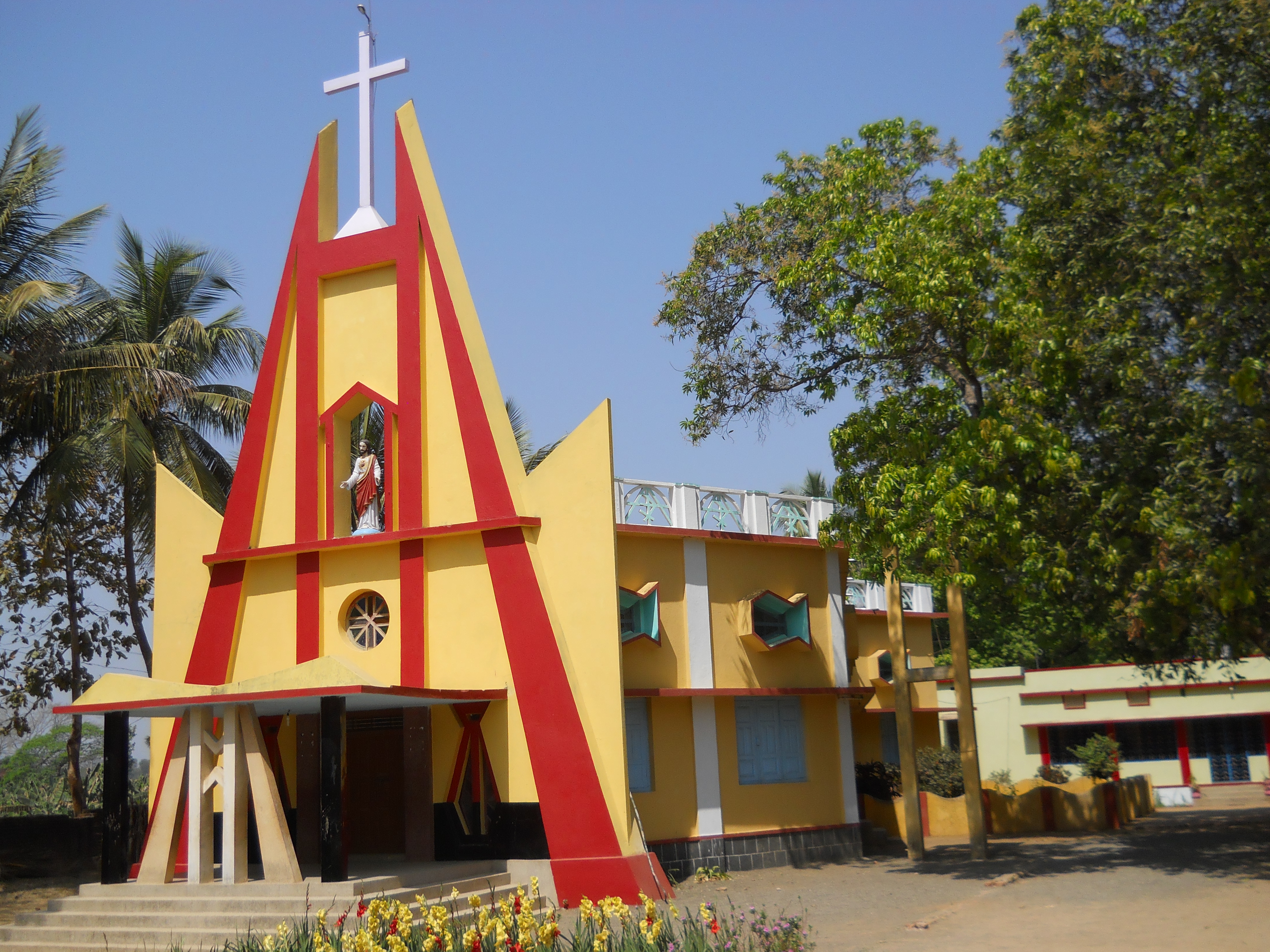
St. Paul's Church at Gunupur

St. Paul's is a Catholic church at Gunupur, Odisha, India. It is one of the oldest Catholic churches of the district. The church is located at 19°4'55"N, 83°48'44"E in Gunupur.

== History ==
Established in 1961, the church celebrated its golden jubilee in 2011.

== Activity ==
Under the social-welfare scheme, a boys' hostel is managed at Gunupur by the church.
