= Cai Lixin =

Chinese politician

- 蔡丽新

Executive Vice Chairwoman of Guangxi
- In office March 2021 – March 2024
- Chairman: Lan Tianli
- Preceded by: Qin Rupei
- Succeeded by: TBA

Personal details
- Born: October 1971 (age 54) Wuxi County, Jiangsu, China
- Party: Chinese Communist Party
- Education: Soochow University

Chinese name
- Simplified Chinese: 蔡丽新
- Traditional Chinese: 蔡麗新
Transcriptions
Standard Mandarin
- Hanyu Pinyin: Cài Lìxīn

Cai Lixin (Chinese: 蔡丽新; born October 1971) is a Chinese politician, currently serving as deputy head of the Society Work Department. She was previously executive vice chairwoman of Guangxi.

Cai is a representative of the 20th National Congress of the Chinese Communist Party and an alternate of the 20th Central Committee of the Chinese Communist Party. Cai is a delegate to the 13th National People's Congress.

== Early life and education ==
Cai was born in Wuxi County (now Wuxi), Jiangsu, in October 1971. In 1990, she entered Soochow University, where she majored in Ideological and political education. She joined the Chinese Communist Party (CCP) in October 1992, when she was a junior student. She also received a master's degree in management and a doctor's degree in law from Soochow University in December 2001 and June 2006, respectively.

== Political career ==
Cai worked in government of Pingjiang District after university in 1994. In November 1995, she became deputy secretary of Pingjiang District Committee of the Communist Youth League of China, rising to secretary the next year. She served as deputy secretary of Suzhou Municipal Committee of the Communist Youth League of China in November 1997, and five years later promoted to the secretary position. In June 2006, she was named acting governor of Pingjiang District, confirmed in the following year. She was appointed head of the Publicity Department of the CCP Suzhou Municipal Committee in September 2011 and was admitted to member of the Standing Committee of the CCP Suzhou Municipal Committee, the city's top authority. She was appointed director of Jiangsu Provincial Network Information Office in June 2015, concurrently serving as deputy head of the Publicity Department of the CCP Jiangsu Provincial Committee. In October 2016, she was appointed head of the Publicity Department of the CCP Nanjing Municipal Committee and was admitted to member of the Standing Committee of the CCP Nanjing Municipal Committee, the capital city's top authority. She served as mayor of Huai'an from January 2018 to December 2019, and party secretary, the top political position in the city, from December 2019 to February 2021. She also served as chairwoman of Huai'an Municipal People's Congress.

In February 2021, Cai was transferred to southwest China' Guangxi Zhuang Autonomous Region and appointed vice chairwoman. She is also a member of the Standing Committee of the CCP Guangxi Zhuang Autonomous Regional Committee, the region's top authority.

Government offices
Preceded by Hui Jianlin	Mayor of Huai'an; 2018–2019	Succeeded by Chen Zhichang
Party political offices
Preceded by Yao Xiaodong	Communist Party Secretary of Huai'an; 2019–2021	Succeeded by Chen Zhichang
Preceded by Qin Rupei	Executive Vice Chairwoman of Guangxi; 2021–2024	Vacant
