= Guilin University of Electronic Technology =

University in Guilin, China

- 桂林电子科技大学 (Chinese); Gveilinz Denjswj Gohgi Dayoz (Zhuang)
- Former name: Guilin Institute of Electronic Technology (1980–2006)
- Motto: 正德厚学、笃行致新
- Motto in English: Upright virtue, profound learning, diligent practice and innovation
- Type: Public
- Established: 1960; 66 years ago
- Budget: ¥1.96 billion (2026)
- President: Zhang Wentao
- Total staff: 3,400 (2026)
- Students: 41,000 (2026)
- Location: Guilin, Guangxi, China
- Campus: 774 acres (313 ha); Urban
- Other sites: Beihai; Nanning
- Colors: Blue
- Website: www.guet.edu.cn

Chinese name
- Simplified Chinese: 桂林电子科技大学
- Traditional Chinese: 桂林電子科技大學
Transcriptions
Standard Mandarin
- Hanyu Pinyin: Guìlín Diànzǐ Kējì Dàxué

The Guilin University of Electronic Technology (GUET) is a provincial university, located in Guangxi, China.

Since its foundation in 1960, Guilin University of Electronic Technology has gradually developed into a university with Electronic Information Technology as its main discipline while the other disciplines include Mechanical Engineering, Business Management, Literature, Law, and Education. The university has established the Guilin Electronics Nanning Research Institute in Nanning. The university library covers an area of over 45,000 square meters and houses over 2.4465 million print books, over 2.069 million e-books, 78 Chinese and foreign databases, and over 554,000 Chinese and foreign electronic journals. The university also boasts an advanced network information platform and a smart campus platform.

== History ==
=== Origins ===
In 1958, against the backdrop of China's Second Five-Year Plan, the First Ministry of Machine-Building Industry formulated a plan to train technocrats and skilled workers for national industrialization development. To fulfill this objective, the ministry issued a directive on 12 February 1960, establishing both Guilin Mechanical College and Guilin Trade School. While in the preparation stage, in April 1960, the ministry decided to merge the trade school into the college, forming two affiliated divisions: the Secondary Specialized Division and the Trade Training Division. To accommodate the new institution, a former sanatorium in Guilin's eastern suburbs was repurposed as its initial campus site. On 15 September 1960, the college held its official opening ceremony. At its founding, the junior college offered six technical majors including radio, radar, computer, and machine manufacturing.

However, this early growth was soon interrupted by national economic crises. In response to severe hardships following the Great Leap Forward, central authorities ordered widespread cutbacks across educational institutions. As a result, the college's Trade Training Division was dissolved in June 1961. Further downsizing took place in April 1962, when the institution was downgraded from to a secondary specialized school and renamed Guilin Mechanical Industry School.

=== Cultural Revolution era ===
During the Cultural Revolution, the school was forced to suspend all student enrollment between 1966 and 1971. Operations restarted in the spring of 1972 when the school was renamed Guilin Radio School, with that year’s initial intake comprising fresh junior high school graduates as well as rusticated youth. From 1973 to 1976, enrollment shifted to worker-peasant-soldier students admitted via political recommendation rather than entrance examination. Standardized merit-based admissions were finally restored in 1977 following the reinstatement of the National College Entrance Examination.

=== Restoration ===
As higher education normalized in the post-Cultural Revolution era, the Guangxi People's Government proposed upgrading Guilin Radio School into a university-level college in early 1978. Following two years of preparations, the proposal received approval from the State Council and the Ministry of Education, leading to the official authorization by the Fourth Ministry of Machine-Building Industry on 20 May 1980 to establish the Guilin Institute of Electronic Technology. The upgraded institution launched with three academic departments offering six majors:

- Department of Electronic and Mechanical Engineering: Manufacturing Processes and Equipment; Electronic Equipment Structure
- Department of Radio Engineering: Communications Engineering; Electronic Instrumentation and Measurement Techniques
- Department of Computer Science: Computer and Applications; Automation

To build its academic capacity, the institute received substantial support from national key universities; Northwest Institute of Telecommunication Engineering transferred 122 staff members (including 87 faculty) to the school, while an additional 28 instructors were recruited from institutions including the Huazhong Institute of Technology and Inner Mongolia University.

=== Expansion and University Status ===
Over the following decades, the institute steadily expanded its academic offerings and credentials. It began offering short-term training programs and workshops in October 1982, began adult higher education in 1984, and introduced sub-degree diploma programs in 1985. On 10 July 1984, the institute was granted official authorization to confer bachelor's degrees. Postgraduate education began in 1985 through a joint master's program with Northwest Institute of Telecommunication Engineering—later expanding to partnerships with other major universities—before gaining independent master's degree-granting authority in December 1993.

As part of broader administrative reforms in Chinese higher education, administration of the institute was transferred from the central Ministry of Information Industry to the Guangxi People's Government in February 2000. On 24 February 2006, the institution attained the university status and was renamed Guilin University of Electronic Technology.

== Campuses ==
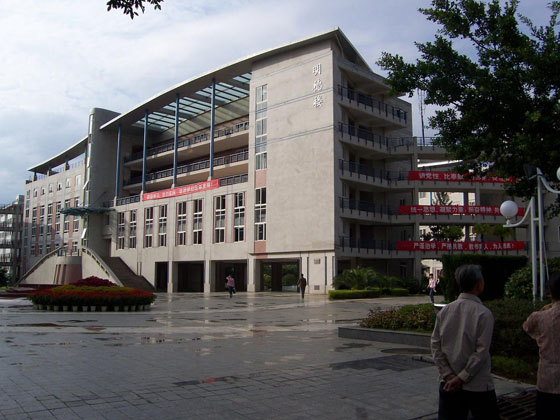
Mingde Building, Jinjiling Campus

The university operates four campuses covering a combined area of 4,700 mu (313 ha):

- Huajiang Campus (Yaoshan Campus)
- Jinjiling Campus (East Campus)
- Liuhe Road Campus (West Campus)
- Beihai Campus (located in Beihai)

== Schools and colleges ==
School / College	Established
School of Mechanical and Electrical Engineering	1980
School of Information and Communication	1980
School of Computer Science and Information Security	1980
School of Art and Design	1988
School of Business	1993
College of Foreign Studies	1993
School of Mathematics and Computing Science	1997
School of Electronic Engineering and Automation	2000
Law School	2003
School of Materials Science and Engineering	2003
School of Marxism	2013
School of Life and Environmental Sciences	2010
School of Architecture and Transportation Engineering	2011
School of Artificial Intelligence	2018
School of Optoelectronic Engineering	2021
College of Continuing Education	1991
College of International Exchange	2006
Clermont Institute of Intelligence and Finance	2025

By 2026, the university conducts its teaching and research through 18 academic schools, colleges, and cooperative institute spanning engineering, natural sciences, management, and the humanities.

== Incidents ==
In November 2018, the university announced plans for the inspection of mobile phones, computers and external disk drives on its campus in order to "stop the spread of content inciting violence, terrorism, harmful political information, pornographic and other content that corrupts thought", but reconsidered these plans after they met with disapproval from a wide range of parties.

== Notable alumni ==
- Jin Shi, Vice President of Southeast University, IEEE Fellow.
- Gou Ping, Chairman of China Satellite Network Group.
- Ouyang Shan, former Professor of School of Information and Communication at GUET, former Vice President of GUET.
- Chen Pinghua, former Secretary of Commission for Discipline Inspection of PLA Rocket Force.
