= Guangxi Zhuang Autonomous Regional Committee of the Chinese People's Political Consultative Conference =

Provincial advisory body in China

Guangxi Zhuang Autonomous Regional Committee of the Chinese People's Political Consultative Conference 中国人民政治协商会议广西壮族自治区委员会
- 13th
- Emblem of the Chinese People's Political Consultative Conference

Type
- Type: United front organ Constitutional convention (Historical); Legislature (Historical) of Chinese People's Political Consultative Conference

History
- Founded: February 1955; 71 years ago
- Preceded by: Guangxi Zhuang Autonomous Regional People's Congress Consultative Committee

Leadership
- Chairperson: Sun Dawei

Website
- www.gxzx.gov.cn

Chinese name
- Simplified Chinese: 中国人民政治协商会议广西壮族自治区委员会
- Traditional Chinese: 中國人民政治協商會議廣西壯族自治區委員會
Transcriptions
Standard Mandarin
- Hanyu Pinyin: Zhōngguó Rénmín Zhèngzhì Xiéshāng Huìyì Guǎngxī Zhuàngzú Zìzhìqū Wěiyuánhuì

Abbreviation
- Simplified Chinese: 广西壮族自治区政协
- Traditional Chinese: 广西壮族自治区政協
- Literal meaning: CPPCC Guangxi Zhuang Autonomous Regional Committee
Transcriptions
Standard Mandarin
- Hanyu Pinyin: Guǎngxī Zhuàngzú Zìzhìqū Zhèngxié

The Guangxi Zhuang Autonomous Regional Committee of the Chinese People's Political Consultative Conference (Chinese: 中国人民政治协商会议广西壮族自治区委员会; abbreviation CPPCC Guangxi Zhuang Autonomous Regional Committee) is the provincial advisory body and a local organization of the Chinese People's Political Consultative Conference in Guangxi, China. It is supervised and directed by the Guangxi Zhuang Autonomous Regional Committee of the Chinese Communist Party.

== History ==
The Guangxi Zhuang Autonomous Regional Committee of the Chinese People's Political Consultative Conference traces its origins to the Guangxi Zhuang Autonomous Regional People's Congress Consultative Committee (广西壮族自治区各界人民代表会议协商委员会), founded in 1949.

=== Anti-corruption campaign ===
On May 16, 2025, Lan Tianli was put under investigation for alleged "serious violations of discipline and laws" by the Central Commission for Discipline Inspection (CCDI), the party's internal disciplinary body, and the National Supervisory Commission, the highest anti-corruption agency of China.

== Term ==
=== 1st ===
- Term: February 1955–March 1958
- Chairperson: Chen Manyuan → Liu Jianxun (September 1957–)
- Vice Chairpersons: Chen Zaili, Zhao Zhuoyun, Lei Peihong, Qiu Chen, Shi Zhaotang, Huang Rong, Lin Hu (December 1956–)

=== 2nd ===
- Term: March 1958–December 1963
- Chairperson: Liu Jianxun → Wei Guoqing (December 1962–)
- Vice Chairpersons: Huang Rong, Lin Hu, Lei Peihong, Qiu Chen, Huang Huiliang (December 1959–), Lu Xiuxuan (December 1959–), Shi Zhaotang (December 1959–), Huang Songjian (December 1962–)

=== 3rd ===
- Term: December 1963–December 1977
- Chairperson: Wei Guoqing
- Vice Chairpersons: Lei Peihong (–July 1967), Lu Xiuxuan, Huang Songjian, Huang Huiliang, Shi Zhaotang, Huang Rong, Qiu Chen (–October 1972)

Secretary-General: Zhu Weigan

=== 4th ===
- Term: December 1977–May 1983
- Chairperson: Qin Yingji → Qiao Xiaoguang (December 1979–)
- Vice Chairpersons: Zhao Maoxun, Zhong Feng, Lu Shaowu, Huang Yiping, Mo Naiqun, Lu Xiuxuan, Shi Zhaotang, Lin Kewu, Zheng Jianxuan, Huang Songjian, Huang Qihan, Ye Pei, Liao Lianyuan (December 1979–), Qin Shimian (December 1979–), Yan Guangcai (December 1979–), Li Tongwen (December 1979–), Liu Guoping (December 1979–), Shang Chi (December 1979–), Huang Dufeng (December 1979–), Gao Tianmei (December 1979–), Sun Zhongyi (December 1979–), Lu Yannan (December 1979–), Lan Changfa (December 1979–), Qin Si (December 1979–), Yang Taiyang (December 1979–), Yang Zongde (December 1979–), Mo Shujie (December 1979–), Zhang Hua (February 1981–)

=== 5th ===
- Term: May 1983–January 1988
- Chairperson: Qin Yingji
- Vice Chairpersons: Liao Lianyuan, Mo Naiqun, Huang Qihan, Ye Pei, Lu Yannan, Liu Guoping, Huang Dufeng, Sun Zhongyi, Qin Si, Yang Taiyang, Mo Shujie, Qu Jiwen (July 1985–), Huang Yuyang (July 1985–)

=== 6th ===
- Term: January 1988–January 1993
- Chairperson: Chen Huiguang
- Vice Chairpersons: Qu Jiwen, Huang Yuyang, Mo Naiqun, Lu Yannan, Huang Dufeng, Wei Ruilin, Yang Taiyang, Ma Minglong, Yao Kelu, Zhong Jiazuo (January 1989–), Wu Keqing (April 1990–), Hou Depeng (April 1990–)
- Secretary-General: Huang Yuyang (concurrently, January 1988 to May 1988) → Chen Ning (acting from May 1988 to January 1989, elected in January 1989)

=== 7th ===
- Term: January 1993–January 1998
- Chairperson: Chen Huiguang
- Vice Chairpersons: Zhong Jiazuo, Long Chuan, Huang Yuyang, Lu Yannan (–December 1997), Wei Ruilin, Hou Depeng, Yao Kelu, Wu Keqing, Ma Minglong, He Xianglin, Mo Xuguang, Chen Leiqing (January 1995–)
- Secretary-General: Li Zhenwu (–January 1996) → Liu Hansheng (January 1996–)

=== 8th ===
- Term: January 1998–January 2003
- Chairperson: Chen Huiguang
- Vice Chairpersons: Yuan Zhengzhong, Chen Leiqing, Wang Qinglu, Song Fumin, Yu Shuxia, Liang Chaoran, Chen Zhenyu, Lu Hushan, Deng Pudong, Liang Yuning
- Secretary-General: Liu Hansheng

=== 9th ===
- Term: January 2003–January 2008
- Chairperson: Ma Qingsheng
- Vice Chairpersons: Wang Hanmin, Jiang Xinghe, Yu Shuxia, Liang Chaoran, Lu Hushan, Deng Pudong, Liang Yuning, Xu Wenyan, Pan Hongquan, Zhang Chongren, Lin Guoqiang (January 2007–)

=== 10th ===
- Term: January 2008–January 2013
- Chairperson: Ma Tieshan
- Vice Chairpersons: Lin Guoqiang, Jiang Jixiong, Li Daqiu, Jiang Peilan, Liang Chunlu (–September 2010), Huang Gesheng, Huang Ribo, Peng Zhao, Li Bin

=== 11th ===
- Term: January 2013–January 2018
- Chairperson: Chen Jiwa
- Vice Chairpersons: Li Daqiu, Huang Gesheng, Huang Ribo, Peng Zhao, Li Bin, Liang Shengli, Lai Derong, Zhang Xiulong, Liu Jun
- Secretary-General: Xuan Peijun

=== 12th ===
- Term: January 2018–January 2023
- Chairperson: Lan Tianli (resigned on January 24, 2021) → Sun Dawei (elected on January 24, 2021)
- Vice Chairpersons: Huang Daowei (resigned on January 24, 2021), Li Kang (resigned on January 24, 2021), Huang Ribo, Chen Gang, Liu Zhengdong (resigned on January 20, 2022), Mo Changying, Peng Xiaochun, Qian Xueming, Liu Muren, Yan Chaojun (elected on January 24, 2021), Wang Naixue (elected on January 24, 2021), Huang Zhou (elected on January 24, 2021), He Xinxing (elected on January 24, 2021), Li Bin (elected on January 20, 2022), Xu Shaochuan (elected on January 20, 2022), Huang Shiyong (elected on January 20, 2022), Fei Zhirong (elected on January 20, 2022), Zhou Chengfang (elected on January 20, 2022)
- Secretary-General: Wang Xiji

=== 13th ===
- Term: January 2023–2028
- Chairperson: Sun Dawei
- Vice Chairpersons: Xu Shaochuan, Fei Zhirong, Huang Junhua, Qian Xueming, Wang Naixue, He Xinxing, Wu Jiashi, Liu Yongmei, Peng Jianming
- Secretary-General: Lu Nenggan
