= Chang Jin =

Chinese astronomer

- 常进

President of the University of Science and Technology of China
- Incumbent
- Assumed office 10 October 2024
- Preceded by: Bao Xinhe

Personal details
- Born: July 1966 (age 60) Taixing, Jiangsu, China
- Education: University of Science and Technology of China
- Scientific career
- Fields: Astronomy
- Workplaces: Purple Mountain Observatory, Chinese Academy of Sciences

Chinese name
- Traditional Chinese: 常進
- Simplified Chinese: 常进
Transcriptions
Standard Mandarin
- Hanyu Pinyin: Cháng Jìn

Chang Jin (Chinese: 常进; born July 1966) is a Chinese astronomer and the current president of the University of Science and Technology of China. He previously served as director of Purple Mountain Observatory and vice president of the Chinese Academy of Sciences.

== Biography ==
Chang was born in Taixing, Jiangsu in July 1966. He graduated from the University of Science and Technology of China.

In August 1992 he joined the Purple Mountain Observatory, where he was promoted to associate research fellow in August 1999 and to research fellow in March 2002. He joined the Chinese Communist Party in April 1995. He served as deputy director of the Purple Mountain Observatory from February 2014 to February 2019. In February 2019 he was appointed director of the Purple Mountain Observatory. He is also the chief scientist of China's Dark Matter Particle Explorer.

In May 2023, Chang became vice president of the Chinese Academy of Sciences.

On 10 October 2024, Chang was appointed president of the University of Science and Technology of China, replacing Bao Xinhe.

== Honors and awards ==
- 8 November 2018 Science and Technology Award of the Ho Leung Ho Lee Foundation
- 22 November 2019 Academician of the Chinese Academy of Sciences (CAS)

Academic offices
Preceded by Yang Ji (杨戟)	Director of the Purple Mountain Observatory; 2019–2020	Succeeded by Zhao Changyin
Educational offices
Preceded by Bao Xinhe	President of the University of Science and Technology of China; 2024–present	Incumbent
