= Qin Rupei =

Chinese politician

- 秦如培

Executive Vice Chairman of Guangxi
- In office February 2018 – January 2023
- Chairman: Chen Wu (politician); Lan Tianli
- Preceded by: Lan Tianli
- Succeeded by: Cai Lixin

Executive Vice Governor of Guizhou
- In office April 2015 – January 2018
- Chairman: Chen Min'er; Sun Zhigang; Shen Yiqin
- Preceded by: Shen Yiqin
- Succeeded by: Li Zaiyong

Personal details
- Born: October 1962 (age 63) Jiangkou County, Guizhou, China
- Party: Chinese Communist Party (1985–2024; expelled)
- Education: Guizhou Agricultural College

Qin Rupei (Chinese: 秦如培; pinyin: Qín Rúpéi; born October 1962) is a former Chinese politician who spent most of his career in southwest China's Guizhou province. As of April 2024, he was under investigation by China's top anti-graft watchdog. Previously he served as vice chairman of Guangxi and before that, vice governor of Guizhou. He was a delegate to the 11th National People's Congress.

== Early life and education ==
Qin was born in Jiangkou County, Guizhou, in October 1962. In 1979, he enrolled at Guizhou Agricultural College (now Guizhou University), where he majored in agronomy.

== Career ==
After college in 1983, Qin was despatched to the Agriculture Bureau of Jiangkou County as an official.

He was transferred to Huaxi District of Guiyang, in February 1985. He joined the Chinese Communist Party (CCP) in July 1985. There, he was in turn deputy head of the Publicity Department, party secretary of Qiantao Township, and finally deputy party secretary of the district. In November 1996, he became secretary of the Guiyang Municipal Committee of the Communist Youth League of China, but having held the position for only over a year. He was governor of Baiyun District from March 1988 to May 2000, and party secretary, the top political position in the district, from May 2000 to May 2002. He was appointed secretary-general of the CCP Guiyang Municipal Committee in April 2002 and was admitted to member of the CCP Guiyang Municipal Committee, the city's top authority. He was deputy party secretary of Guiyang in November 2003, in addition to serving as secretary of the Political and Legal Affairs Commission.

He became mayor of Bijie in November 2006, and then party secretary, the top political position in the city, beginning in May 2008. In April 2012, he was admitted as a member of the CCP Guizhou Provincial Committee, the province's top authority. He rose to become vice governor of Guizhou in July 2012, concurrently serving as secretary of the Political and Legal Affairs Commission.

He was transferred to Guangxi in January 2018, where he was appointed executive vice chairman of Guangxi, president of Guangxi University of Administration, and member of the CCP Guangxi Regional Committee. He also served as party secretary of the State owned Assets Supervision and Administration Commission of Guangxi Zhuang Autonomous Region.

== Downfall ==
On 16 April 2024, he was placed under investigation for "serious violations of laws and regulations" by the Central Commission for Discipline Inspection (CCDI), the party's internal disciplinary body, and the National Supervisory Commission, the highest anti-corruption agency of China. His successor Li Zaiyong, also executive vice governor of Guizhou from 2018 to 2022, was disgraced in March 2023. On October 11, he was stripped of his posts within the CCP and in the public office. On November 4, the Supreme People's Procuratorate signed an arrest order for him for taking bribes.

On 16 February 2025, Qin was indicted on suspicion of accepting bribes. On August 6, the public prosecutors accused him of abusing his multiple positions between 1998 and 2024 in both Guizhou and Guangxi to seek favor on behalf of certain organizations and individuals in matters such as project contracting, business operations and job transfers, in return, he accepted 216 million yuan ($30.04 million) worth of money and valuables personally or through his family members. He was sentenced to death with a two-year reprieve for bribery by Deyang Intermediate People's Court, he was also deprived of his political rights for life, and ordered by the court to have all his personal assets confiscated and turn over all illicit gains and their interests to the state.

Government offices
| Preceded by Huang Jiapei | Mayor of Bijie; 2006–2008 | Succeeded by Zhang Jiyong |
| Preceded by Shen Yiqin | Executive Vice Governor of Guizhou; 2015–2018 | Succeeded by Li Zaiyong |
| Preceded by Lan Tianli | Executive Vice Chairman of Guangxi; 2018–2023 | Succeeded by Cai Lixin |
Party political offices
| Preceded by Liu Xiaokai | Communist Party Secretary of Bijie; 2008–2012 | Succeeded by Zhang Jiyong |
| Preceded by Cui Yadong | Secretary of the Political and Legal Affairs Commission of the Guizhou Provincial Committee of the Chinese Communist Party; 2013–2015 | Succeeded by Shen Yiqin |
| Preceded by Li Jieyun | Communist Party Secretary of the State owned Assets Supervision and Administration Commission of Guangxi Zhuang Autonomous Region; 2022–2024 | Succeeded by TBA |
