= Qian Linzhao =

Chinese physicist and politician

Qian Linzhao (Chinese: 钱临照; Wade–Giles: Ch'ien Lin-chao; 28 August 1906 – 26 July 1999), also known as Tsien Ling-Chao, was a Chinese optical physicist and historian. He was a founding member of the Chinese Academy of Sciences, and served as Vice President of the University of Science and Technology of China. He co-founded the Chinese Electron Microscopy Society, which established the Qian Linzhao Award in his memory.

== Early life and education ==
Qian was born in Wuxi, Jiangsu, China on 28 August 1906. His father, Qian Bogui (钱伯圭), was the teacher of the celebrated historian Qian Mu (Ch'ien Mu); his younger brother, Qian Lingxi (1916–2009), was also a distinguished scientist and a founding member of the Chinese Academy of Sciences.

In 1929, Qian graduated from Utopia University in Shanghai with a bachelor's degree in physics, and became an assistant lecturer at the Northeastern University in Shenyang. In 1934, he was awarded a Boxer Indemnity Scholarship to study at the University of London, University College, where he spent three years conducting research on cubic crystal structures. After becoming disenchanted with the discrimination against foreign students in England, he left for Berlin, Germany in 1937.

== Second Sino-Japanese War ==
When the Second Sino-Japanese War broke out in July 1937, Qian returned to China to join the resistance. He helped the Institute of Physics of the Beiping Academy to evacuate Beiping (Beijing), which had come under Japanese attack, and to relocate to Kunming in southwestern China. He assisted Yan Jici, the director of the institute, with establishing an optical workshop in Kunming, where they developed and manufactured hundreds of high-powered microscopes and other instruments for hospitals and factories. He designed an instrument that measured tiny curvatures, which became widely used in Chinese factories.

Qian was also interested in the history of physics. He studied the Mozi (Mohist Canon), and wrote a seminal paper on mechanics and optics in ancient China. When he met Joseph Needham in Kunming in 1943, he showed Needham his paper, which directly influenced the latter's interpretation of the Mozi and the treatment of physics in his Science and Civilisation in China.

== People's Republic of China ==
After the establishment of the People's Republic of China in 1949, Qian was elected a founding member of the Chinese Academy of Sciences in 1955. In 1958, he became a physics professor at the newly established the University of Science and Technology of China (USTC). He also co-founded the Chinese Electron Microscopy Society.

In 1969–1970, during the Cultural Revolution, the USTC was relocated to Hefei, Anhui. Many of its professors and researchers refused to leave Beijing for the provincial city and quit the university, while Qian Linzhao and Qian Zhidao were the only two academicians who were willing to move. However, just eight days after he arrived in Hefei, he was denounced as a "capitalist reactionary academic authority". Already 64, he was sent to work at a coal mine in Huainan for five months to be "reeducated by the working class".

After the end the Cultural Revolution, Qian was appointed Vice President of USTC at the age of 72. Concerned with the advanced age of most Chinese professors, he personally led the Special Class for the Gifted Young at USTC and taught the young students. He required all professors up to department chairs and school deans to give lectures, a rule that is still in force.

== Death and legacy ==
Qian died on 26 July 1999, at the age of 92. The Chinese Electron Microscopy Society established the Qian Linzhao Award in his memory to reward outstanding researchers in electron microscopy.
