= National Science Review =

Academic journal

- Discipline: Multidisciplinary scientific
- Language: English

Publication details
- History: 2014–present
- Publisher: Oxford University Press
- Frequency: Bimonthly
- Open access: Yes

Standard abbreviations
- ISO 4: Natl. Sci. Rev.

Indexing
- CODEN: NSRACI
- ISSN: 2095-5138 (print); 2053-714X (web)

National Science Review (Chinese title: 国家科学评论) is an English-language peer-reviewed multidisciplinary open-access scientific journal published by Oxford University Press under the auspices of the Chinese Academy of Sciences. The journal publishes both review articles and perspectives as well as original research in the form of brief communications and research articles. According to Journal Citation Reports, its 2021 impact factor was 23.178.

== History ==
The journal was established in 2014 with Chunli Bai as Editor-in-Chief and a stated aim of serving as a channel for the dissemination of scientific achievements by the Chinese scientific community to a worldwide audience as well as a forum for the discussion of scientific policy and interviews of leading researchers. In its inaugural editorial, it specifically identified physical sciences, chemical sciences, life sciences, environmental and earth sciences, materials sciences, and information and engineering sciences as areas of natural and applied science to be covered by the journal.

Since its founding, the journal has witnessed a rapid rise in indicators of scientific impact, including its impact factor (8.843 in 2016, 17.275 in 2020) and total citation count (512 times in 2016, 5889 times in 2020).

From 2014 to 2016, it was published quarterly; from 2017 to 2019, it was published bimonthly. Since 2020, it has been published monthly.
