= Li Zaiyong =

Chinese politician (born 1962)

- 李再勇

Vice Chairman of the Guizhou Provincial Committee of the Chinese People's Political Consultative Conference
- In office January 2022 – January 2023
- Chairman: Liu Xiaokai

Executive Vice Governor of Guizhou Provincial People's Government
- In office January 2018 – May 2022
- Governor: Shen Yiqin; Li Bingjun
- Preceded by: Qin Rupei
- Succeeded by: Wu Qiang

Personal details
- Born: August 1962 (age 64) Wuchuan Gelao and Miao Autonomous County, Guizhou, China
- Party: Chinese Communist Party (1984–2023; expelled)
- Education: Guizhou University; Central Party School of the Chinese Communist Party

Li Zaiyong (Chinese: 李再勇; pinyin: Lǐ Zàiyǒng; born August 1962) is a former Chinese politician of Gelao ethnicity who was executive vice governor of Guizhou Provincial People's Government from 2018 to 2022 and vice chairman of the Guizhou Provincial Committee of the Chinese People's Political Consultative Conference from 2022 to 2023. As of March 2023, he was under investigation by China's top anti-corruption agency.

He was a delegate to the 12th and 13th National People's Congress.

== Early life and education ==
Li was born in Wuchuan Gelao and Miao Autonomous County, Guizhou, in August 1962. After resuming the college entrance examination, in 1979, he entered Guizhou Agricultural College (now Guizhou University), where he majored in agronomy.

== Career ==
Li began his political career in August 1983, and joined the Chinese Communist Party (CCP) in April 1984.

Starting in August 1983, he served in several posts in Tongzi County, including town headman, deputy head of the Organization Department of the Chinese Communist Party, director of the Office of the County Party Committee and director of the Research Office, and deputy party secretary of the county. He served as magistrate of the county from 1992 to 1995, and party secretary, the top political position in the county, from 1995 to 1998.

Li was appointed party secretary of Honghuagang District in January 1998 and two years later was admitted to member of the CCP Zunyi Municipal Committee, the city's top authority.

In November 2001, he became vice governor of Qiandongnan Miao and Dong Autonomous Prefecture and member of the CCP Qiandongnan Miao and Dong Autonomous Prefectural Committee, and held that offices until May 2008.

Li was made mayor of Tongren in May 2008, in addition to serving as deputy party secretary.

He was appointed deputy party secretary of the capital city Guiyang in February 2011, concurrently serving as mayor since March of that same year.

He was chosen as party secretary of Liupanshui in November 2013 and in December 2016 was admitted as a member of the CCP Guizhou Provincial Committee, the province's top authority.

He was secretary-general of CCP Guizhou Provincial Committee in January 2017 and subsequently party secretary of Guiyang in August 2017. He was elevated to executive vice governor of Guizhou in January 2018. In January 2022, he took office as vice chairman of the Guizhou Provincial Committee of the Chinese People's Political Consultative Conference, the provincial advisory body.

== Downfall ==
On 27 March 2023, Li has been placed under investigation for "serious violations of laws and regulations" by the Central Commission for Discipline Inspection (CCDI), the party's internal disciplinary body, and the National Supervisory Commission, the highest anti-corruption agency of China. On November 8, he was expelled from the CCP and removed from public office, and was arrested by the Supreme People's Procuratorate.

On 23 May 2024, Li stood trial for graft at the Fifth Intermediate People's Court of Chongqing Municipality, pleaded guilty to accepting bribes worth more than 400 million yuan ($59.6 million) and abusing power. On August 13, he was sentenced to death with a two-year reprieve by the Fifth Intermediate People's Court of Chongqing Municipality.

Party political offices
Preceded by Wang Xiaoguang	Communist Party Secretary of Liupanshui; 2013–2017	Succeeded by Zhou Rong (周荣)
Preceded by Liu Qifan	Secretary General of Guizhou Provincial Committee of the Chinese Communist Party; 2017	Succeeded by Tang Chengpei
Preceded by Chen Gang	Communist Party Secretary of Guiyang; 2017–2018	Succeeded by Zhao Deming
Government offices
Preceded by Liao Guoxun	Mayor of Tongren; 2008–2011	Succeeded by Xia Qingfeng
Preceded by Yuan Zhou	Mayor of Guiyang; 2011–2013	Succeeded by Liu Wenxin
Preceded by Qin Rupei	Executive Vice Governor of Guizhou Provincial People's Government; 2018–2022	Succeeded by Wu Qiang
