= Ma Biao (politician) =

Chinese politician (born 1954)

Ma Biao Maz Biauz
- 马飚
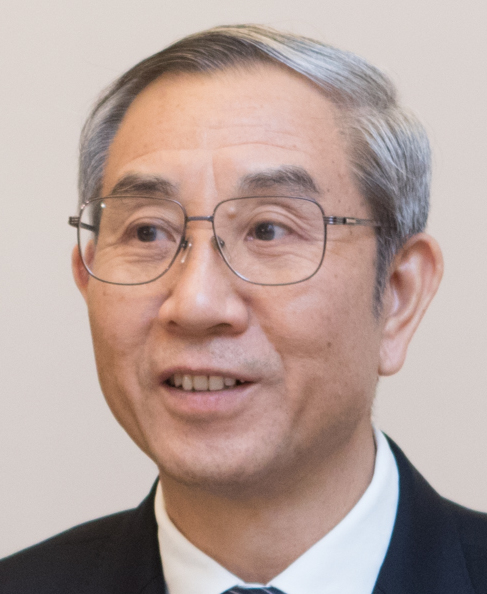
- Ma Biao, 2017

Vice Chairman of the Chinese People's Political Consultative Conference
- In office 11 March 2011 – 10 March 2023
- Chairman: Jia Qinglin; Yu Zhengsheng; Wang Yang

Chairman of Guangxi
- In office 26 January 2008 – 28 March 2013
- Party Secretary: Guo Shengkun; Peng Qinghua
- Preceded by: Lu Bing
- Succeeded by: Chen Wu

Personal details
- Born: August 1954 (age 72) Tianyang County, Guangxi, China (now Tianyang District)
- Party: Chinese Communist Party

Ma Biao (Chinese: 马飚; Zhuang: Maz Biauz; born August 1954) is a retired Chinese politician of ethnic Zhuang heritage. Born in Guangxi, Ma joined the Chinese Communist Party (CCP) in 1985. He was elected chairman of the Guangxi government on January 26, 2008, and served this post until March 2013. He was a member of the 18th Central Committee of the CCP. He additionally served as a vice chairman of the Chinese People's Political Consultative Conference between 2011 and 2023.

== Early life and education ==
Ma was born in August 1954 in Tianyang County in Baise, Guangxi. During the Cultural Revolution, after completing his secondary education, he worked as a laborer at the Liuzhou Iron and Steel Plant in Guangxi. When the national college entrance examination system (gaokao) was reinstated, he successfully gained admission in 1978 to the Department of Political Science and Political Economy at the Central University for Nationalities (now Minzu University of China). He worked at the steel plant from October 1972 until 1978, and he graduated with a degree in political economy in 1982.

== Political career ==
Upon graduation, Ma began his career in economic research, working first at the Planning and Economic Research Institute of the Guangxi Zhuang Autonomous Region Planning Commission and later at the Institute of Ethnology and Anthropology under the Chinese Academy of Social Sciences. At the Guangxi institute, he rose from assistant research fellow to associate research fellow and deputy director between 1982 and 1991. In June 1985, he joined the Chinese Communist Party. From 1990 to 1991, he served in a temporary post as Deputy Party Secretary of the Luocheng Mulao Autonomous County, Guangxi. At the Chinese Academy of Social Sciences, he was an associate research fellow from 1991 and headed the Institute of Ethnology's economics research office from 1992 to 1994, with the rank of research fellow.

In 1994, Ma began serving as assistant to the Party Secretary of Beihai. Over the following years, he held a series of roles, including Deputy Director of the Guangxi Economic Restructuring Commission, Vice Chairman of the Guangxi Youth Federation, Commissioner of the Baise Prefecture Administrative Office and Party Secretary of Baise Prefecture. Following the 2003 administrative merger of Baise prefecture and city, Ma became the first Party Secretary of the newly formed Baise city. He was deputy director of the Economic Restructuring Commission from 1994 to 1998, deputy party secretary and commissioner of Baise Prefecture from 1998 to 2002, and party secretary of Baise from 2002 to 2004.

In 2004, he was promoted to Vice Chairman of the People’s Government of the Guangxi Zhuang Autonomous Region. By March 2005, he had become a Standing Committee Member of the CCP Guangxi Regional Committee, while concurrently serving as Party Secretary of Nanning, the capital of Guangxi, and Chairman of the Standing Committee of the Nanning People’s Congress. In December 2007, Ma was appointed Deputy Party Secretary of Guangxi, Vice Chairman of the autonomous region’s government, and Acting Chairman. He was formally elected Chairman of the People’s Government of the Guangxi Zhuang Autonomous Region in January 2008. He remained party secretary of Nanning until he became chairman. In 2007, he was elected an alternate member of the 17th Central Committee.

=== Chairman of Guangxi ===
As chairman, Ma promoted the Guangxi Beibu Gulf Economic Zone and Guangxi's role in China's relations with the Association of Southeast Asian Nations (ASEAN). At the National People's Congress in March 2008, he described the zone as one of the first in China to pilot "development priority zoning" and as a gateway to ASEAN countries, and he proposed that the central government back its growth as strongly as it had backed the Binhai area in Tianjin.

In September 2010, Ma led a Guangxi delegation to Vietnam for a meeting of the joint working committee between Guangxi and the Vietnamese border provinces of Lạng Sơn, Cao Bằng, Hà Giang and Quảng Ninh. In Hanoi, he met the Vietnamese National Assembly chairman Nguyễn Phú Trọng and proposed speeding up the development of a Nanning–Hanoi economic corridor and more exchanges between border localities. In 2011, he said that one of Guangxi's main tasks in the 12th Five-Year Plan was to accelerate the construction of a high-speed railway linking Nanning with ASEAN countries such as Singapore.

=== Chinese People's Political Consultative Conference ===
Ma Biao was elected Vice Chairman of the 12th National Committee of the Chinese People's Political Consultative Conference (CPPCC) in March 2013, succeeding Li Zhaozhuo. He was also a member of the CPPCC National Committee's party group. In January 2018, he was elected a member of the 13th CPPCC National Committee and was re-elected as its Vice Chairman in March of that year. He was a full member of the 18th and 19th Central Committees of the CCP.

As a CPPCC vice chairman, Ma met foreign delegations and visitors, including delegations from South Korea, an Italian parliamentary friendship group, and party delegations from Uruguay and Colombia, and in November 2014 he met the first deputy speaker of Azerbaijan's National Assembly in Baku. In July 2014, he spoke at a CPPCC symposium in Nanning on a key proposal to draw up a revitalization plan for the Zuo and You River revolutionary base areas in Guangxi, and he urged that the plan be raised to a national strategy. In December 2018, he was a deputy head of the central government delegation led by Wang Yang to the celebrations of the 60th anniversary of the Guangxi Zhuang Autonomous Region.

In June 2022, Ma led a team of the CPPCC's Proposals Committee to Yunnan and Guangxi to follow up a key proposal to establish a national park for karst landscapes, which he said would fill a gap in China's national park system. In July 2022, he met envoys from the ten ASEAN countries visiting the CPPCC National Committee. In November 2022, he led a delegation of CPPCC members without party affiliation on a study tour of Hunan. He stepped down from his position as Vice Chairman of the CPPCC on 10 March 2023.

Government offices
| Preceded by Lu Bing | Chairman of Guangxi; 2008–2013 | Succeeded by Chen Wu |
Party political offices
| Preceded by Li Jiheng | Party Secretary of Nanning; 2005-2007 | Succeeded by Che Rongfu |
| Preceded by Position established | Party Secretary of Baise; 2002-2004 | Succeeded by Liang Chunlu |
