= Tang Honggao =

Chinese crystallographer and university administrator

- 汤洪高

President of the University of Science and Technology of China
- In office July 1993 – June 1998
- Preceded by: Gu Chaohao
- Succeeded by: Zhu Qingshi

Communist Party Secretary of the University of Science and Technology of China
- In office July 1998 – May 2003
- Preceded by: Yu Xianglin
- Succeeded by: Guo Chuanjie
- In office April 1990 – August 1993
- Preceded by: Liu Naiquan
- Succeeded by: Yu Xianglin

Personal details
- Born: 7 September 1939 (age 87) Yanggu County, Shandong, China
- Party: Chinese Communist Party
- Education: Shandong University; Institute of Physics, Chinese Academy of Sciences
- Scientific career
- Fields: Crystallography
- Workplaces: University of Science and Technology of China

Chinese name
- Simplified Chinese: 汤洪高
- Traditional Chinese: 湯洪高
Transcriptions
Standard Mandarin
- Hanyu Pinyin: Tāng Hónggāo

Tang Honggao (Chinese: 汤洪高; born 7 September 1939) is a Chinese crystallographer and university administrator who served as president of the University of Science and Technology of China from 1993 to 1998. He also served two separate terms as party secretary of the university, from 1990 to 1993 and from 1998 to 2003.

Tang was a representative of the 13th, 14th, 15th, and 16th National Congress of the Chinese Communist Party. He was an alternate member of the 14th and 15th Central Committee of the Chinese Communist Party. He was a member of the 15th Central Committee of the Chinese Communist Party.

== Biography ==
Tang was born in Yanggu County, Shandong, on 7 September 1939. In 1958, he was accepted to Shandong University, where he majored in crystal chemistry. From 1962 to 1966 he did his postgraduate work at the Institute of Physics, Chinese Academy of Sciences.

After graduation in 1966, Tang became an intern researcher in the No. 4 Crystallographic Research Room. He joined the Chinese Communist Party (CCP) in August 1972. In September 1973, he moved to the Anhui Institute Of Optics and Fine Mechanics, where he successively served as an assistant researcher, associate researcher, laboratory director, and party secretary. In July 1983, he was appointed party branch secretary of Hefei Institutes of Physical Science, a position he held until May 1990. He took office as executive vice president and party secretary of the University of Science and Technology of China in May 1990, rising to president in July 1993.

== Honours and awards ==
- 27 November 2017 Member of the Chinese Academy of Sciences (CAS)

Educational offices
Preceded by Gu Chaohao	Dean of the Graduate School of the University of Science and Technology of China; 1996–2000	Succeeded by Zhu Qingshi
Preceded by Gu Chaohao	President of the University of Science and Technology of China; 1993–1998	Succeeded by Zhu Qingshi
