= People's Government of the Guangxi Zhuang Autonomous Region =

Provincial-level government in China

Guangxi Zhuang Autonomous Region People's Government 广西壮族自治区人民政府
- Established: February 1950; 76 years ago

Leadership
- Chairman: Wei Tao; 3 July 2025
- Parent body: Central People's Government; People's Congress of the Guangxi Zhuang Autonomous Region
- Elected by: People's Congress of the Guangxi Zhuang Autonomous Region

Website
- www.gxzf.gov.cn

The People's Government of the Guangxi Zhuang Autonomous Region is the local administrative agency of Guangxi. It is officially elected by the People's Congress of the Guangxi Zhuang Autonomous Region and is formally responsible to the People's Congress and its Standing Committee. Under the country's one-party system, the chairman is subordinate to the secretary of the Guangxi Zhuang Autonomous Regional Committee of the Chinese Communist Party. The Regional government is headed by a chairman, currently Wei Tao.

== History ==
On October 31, 1949, the Chinese People's Liberation Army launched the Guangxi Campaign. On November 22, they occupied Guilin, the capital of Guangxi Province. On December 4, they occupied Nanning. On December 14, they occupied Zhennanguan. In February 1950, the Guangxi Provincial People's Government was established in Nanning, with Zhang Yun逸as the first chairman. On March 5, 1958, Guangxi Province was changed to Guangxi Zhuang Autonomous Region. In 1965, Qinzhou and Lianzhou were again transferred from Guangdong Province to Guangxi. On October 12, 1965, with the approval of the State Council of China, the Guangxi Zhuang Autonomous Region was renamed "Guangxi Zhuang Autonomous Region".

On August 26, 1968, with the approval of the Central Committee, the Guangxi Zhuang Autonomous Region Revolutionary Committee was established and the Guangxi Zhuang Autonomous Region People's Committee was abolished. In December 1977, the Guangxi Zhuang Autonomous Region People's Government was re-established. In 1978, the People's Congress of the Autonomous Region decided to set the anniversary of the establishment of the Autonomous Region as December 11, which coincided with the day when the Chinese People's Liberation Army captured all of Guangxi, the Youjiang Soviet Union and the establishment of the Red Seventh Army.

== Organization ==
The organization of the People's Government of the Guangxi Zhuang Autonomous Region includes:

- General Office of the People's Government of the Guangxi Zhuang Autonomous Region

=== Component Departments ===
- Guangxi Zhuang Autonomous Region Development and Reform Commission
- Guangxi Zhuang Autonomous Region Education Department
- Guangxi Zhuang Autonomous Region Science and Technology Department
- Department of Industry and Information Technology of Guangxi Zhuang Autonomous Region
- Guangxi Zhuang Autonomous Region Ethnic and Religious Affairs Committee
- Guangxi Zhuang Autonomous Region Public Security Department
- Civil Affairs Department of Guangxi Zhuang Autonomous Region
- Guangxi Zhuang Autonomous Region Justice Department
- Guangxi Zhuang Autonomous Region Finance Department
- Guangxi Zhuang Autonomous Region Human Resources and Social Security Department
- Guangxi Zhuang Autonomous Region Natural Resources Department
- Department of Ecology and Environment of Guangxi Zhuang Autonomous Region
- Department of Housing and Urban-Rural Development of Guangxi Zhuang Autonomous Region
- Department of Transportation of Guangxi Zhuang Autonomous Region
- Guangxi Zhuang Autonomous Region Water Resources Department
- Guangxi Zhuang Autonomous Region Agriculture and Rural Affairs Department
- Department of Commerce of Guangxi Zhuang Autonomous Region
- Department of Culture and Tourism of Guangxi Zhuang Autonomous Region
- Guangxi Zhuang Autonomous Region Health Commission
- Guangxi Zhuang Autonomous Region Veterans Affairs Department
- Guangxi Zhuang Autonomous Region Emergency Management Department
- Audit Office of Guangxi Zhuang Autonomous Region
- Foreign Affairs Office of Guangxi Zhuang Autonomous Region

=== Directly affiliated special institution ===
- State-owned Assets Supervision and Administration Commission of the People's Government of the Guangxi Zhuang Autonomous Region

=== Organizations under the government ===
- Guangxi Zhuang Autonomous Region Market Supervision Administration
- Guangxi Zhuang Autonomous Region Radio and Television Bureau
- Guangxi Zhuang Autonomous Region Sports Bureau
- Guangxi Zhuang Autonomous Region Statistics Bureau
- Guangxi Zhuang Autonomous Region Forestry Bureau
- Guangxi Zhuang Autonomous Region National Defense Mobilization Office
- Guangxi Zhuang Autonomous Region Industrial Park Reform and Development Office
- Guangxi Zhuang Autonomous Region Big Data Development Bureau
- Guangxi Zhuang Autonomous Region Government Affairs Bureau
- Guangxi Zhuang Autonomous Region Medical Security Bureau (Deputy Department Level)

=== Departmental management organization ===
- The Guangxi Zhuang Autonomous Region Grain and Material Reserves Bureau is managed by the Autonomous Region Development and Reform Commission.
- The Guangxi Zhuang Autonomous Region Prison Administration Bureau is managed by the Autonomous Region Justice Department.
- The Guangxi Zhuang Autonomous Region Marine Bureau is managed by the Autonomous Region's Department of Natural Resources.
- The Guangxi Zhuang Autonomous Region Traditional Chinese Medicine Administration is managed by the Autonomous Region Health Commission.
- The Guangxi Zhuang Autonomous Region Drug Supervision and Administration Bureau is managed by the Autonomous Region Market Supervision Bureau.

=== Directly affiliated institutions ===
- Guangxi Zhuang Autonomous Region Second Light Industry Town Collective Industry Federation
- Guangxi Zhuang Autonomous Region Investment Promotion Bureau
- Guangxi Zhuang Autonomous Region Public Resources Trading Center
- Guangxi Zhuang Autonomous Region People's Government Counselor's Office
- Guangxi Zhuang Autonomous Region People's Government Development Research Center
- Guangxi Zhuang Autonomous Region Party Committee, Guangxi Zhuang Autonomous Region People's Government Reception Office
- Guangxi International Exposition Affairs Bureau

=== Dispatching Agency ===
- Guangxi Zhuang Autonomous Region People's Government Office in Beijing
- Guangxi Zhuang Autonomous Region People's Government Office in Guangzhou

== See also ==
- Politics of Guangxi
  - People's Congress of the Guangxi Zhuang Autonomous Region
  - People's Government of the Guangxi Zhuang Autonomous Region
    - Chairman of Guangxi
  - Guangxi Zhuang Autonomous Regional Committee of the Chinese Communist Party
    - Party Secretary of Guangxi
  - Guangxi Regional Committee of the Chinese People's Political Consultative Conference
