= Yu Yuanhui =

Chinese politician

- 余远辉

Communist Party Secretary of Nanning
- In office May 2013 – May 2015
- Preceded by: Chen Wu
- Succeeded by: Wang Xiaodong

Communist Party Secretary of Wuzhou
- In office 2006–2008
- Preceded by: Ren Xiekang (任燮康)
- Succeeded by: Liu Zhiyong (刘志勇)

Personal details
- Born: January 1964 (age 62) Gongcheng Yao Autonomous County, Guangxi
- Party: Chinese Communist Party (expelled)
- Education: Guangxi Agricultural College; Dalian University of Technology
- Occupation: Politician

Chinese name
- Traditional Chinese: 余遠輝
- Simplified Chinese: 余远辉
Transcriptions
Standard Mandarin
- Hanyu Pinyin: Yú Yuǎnhuī

Yu Yuanhui (Chinese: 余远辉; born January 1964) is a Chinese politician of ethnic Yao heritage who spent most of his career in Southwest China's Guangxi Zhuang Autonomous Region. Until 2015, he served as the Communist Party Secretary of Nanning, capital of Guangxi, and was a Standing Committee member of the regional party organization. In May 2015, he was put under investigation by the Chinese Communist Party's anti-corruption agency. An alternate member of the Central Committee from 2007 until his downfall, Yu was duly expelled from the party and lost his Central Committee seat in 2015 and was sentenced to 11 years in jail.

== Career ==
Yu was born in Gongcheng Yao Autonomous County, Guangxi, in January 1964. He joined the Chinese Communist Party while attending university in December 1984. In 1986 he graduated from Guangxi Agricultural College (later merged into Guangxi University, majoring in agriculture. After graduating, he stayed at the school and become involved in the Communist Youth League organization there. In 1989, he began studying social sciences and political theory at Dalian University of Technology. By 1992, he had become the head of the Youth League organization at his alma mater, with a promising political future.

In 1995, he had joined the party organization in Qinzhou, and ascended through the ranks there. By 1998, he had assumed the post of deputy head of the provincial department of personnel. During his political career, Yu continued further education at the provincial party school, the Minzu University of China, and Guangxi University, eventually earning a master's degree in law. He was sent on a brief stint to study English in the United States.

In 2001, Yu, then 37, was made head of the Guangxi Communist Youth League organization. After taking on the position at the Youth League, Yu took part in further studies at Tsinghua University and also at Kennedy School of Government at Harvard University. In 2006 he became the Deputy Communist Party Secretary and Mayor of Wuzhou, rising to Communist Party Secretary in 2008, and joining the Guangxi regional Party Standing Committee as its youngest member; a year later, he was named secretary-general of the provincial party committee.

Yu, an ethnic minority with a strong Youth League pedigree, and elected as an alternate member of the 17th Central Committee in 2007 at the mere age of 43, was seen as an up-and-coming political star.

In May 2013, Yu was appointed the Communist Party Secretary of Nanning. On May 23, 2015, the Central Commission for Discipline Inspection announced that Yu was held for investigation. Yu's downfall was sudden; Yu had been active the week prior in all sorts of activities, including attending the opening ceremonies of the local multi-sporting competition. Prior to his downfall, Yu had also been vocal about the anti-corruption campaign.

== Corruption investigation ==
On October 16, 2015, Yu was expelled from the Communist Party. The investigation concluded Yu had "violated political rules and political discipline," openly published "opinions contrary to the spirit of the policy of ruling the party strictly," practiced nepotism when selecting his secretary, obfuscated his activities, aided in the business interests of others, accepted bribes, wasted public funds, used his publicly funded vehicle for private purposes. The announcement came on the eve of the 5th Plenary Session of the 18th Central Committee, at which Yu's expulsion was confirmed. Yu was sentenced to 11 years in prison, for taking some 8.81 million yuan (~$1.47 million) in bribes on April 28, 2017.

Yu was a member of the 10th National Committee of the Chinese People's Political Consultative Conference and an alternate member of the 17th and 18th Central Committees of the Chinese Communist Party.

Party political offices
Previous: Ren Xiekang (任燮康)	Communist Party Secretary of Wuzhou; 2008–2009	Next: Liu Zhiyong (刘志勇)
Previous: Chen Wu	Communist Party Secretary of Nanning; 2013–2015	Next: Wang Xiaodong
