= Sun Dawei =

Chinese politician

- 孙大伟

Chairman of the Guangxi Zhuang Autonomous Regional Committee of the Chinese People's Political Consultative Conference
- Incumbent
- Assumed office 24 January 2021
- Preceded by: Lan Tianli

Deputy Communist Party Secretary of Guangxi
- In office 24 October 2017 – January 2021
- Leader: Lu Xinshe; Peng Qinghua
- Preceded by: Hou Jianguo
- Succeeded by: Liu Xiaoming

Personal details
- Born: April 1963 (age 63) Anda, Heilongjiang, China
- Party: Chinese Communist Party
- Education: Harbin Engineering University; University of International Business and Economics; Central Party School

Chinese name
- Traditional Chinese: 孫大偉
- Simplified Chinese: 孙大伟
Transcriptions
Standard Mandarin
- Hanyu Pinyin: Sūn Dàwěi

Sun Dawei (Chinese: 孙大伟; born April 1963) is a Chinese politician, and current Deputy Communist Party Secretary of the Guangxi Zhuang Autonomous Region.

Sun was born in Anda, Heilongjiang. He joined the Chinese Communist Party in December 1984, and is a graduate of the Harbin Engineering University, where he majored in management science and engineering. He began work in July 1986. He began his climb on the bureaucratic ladder initially as the head of the Inspection and Quarantine Bureau in Chaoyang District. He then joined the General Administration of Quality Supervision, Inspection and Quarantine as a deputy head, then head, of the inspection supervision department (检验监管司). He was then named executive deputy chair of the Certification and Accreditation Administration of the People's Republic of China, then elevated to chair in 2005.

In 2010, Sun was named deputy chair of AQSIQ, while concurrently holding his role at the Certification and Accreditation Administration.

In June 2017, Sun was transferred to become deputy party chief of the Guangxi Zhuang Autonomous Region.

Party political offices
Preceded by Hou Jianguo	Deputy Communist Party Secretary of the Guangxi Zhuang Autonomous Region; 2017–2021	Succeeded by Liu Xiaoming
Assembly seats
Preceded by Lan Tianli	Chairman of the Guangxi Zhuang Autonomous Regional Committee of the Chinese People's Political Consultative Conference; 2021	Incumbent
