= Wang Xiaodong (born 1962) =

Chinese politician

Wang Xiaodong (Chinese: 王小东; born January 1962) is a Chinese politician, serving since 2015 as the Communist Party Secretary of Nanning, the capital of Guangxi Zhuang Autonomous Region. Previously he served as party chief of Beihai.

== Biography ==
Wang was born in 1962 in Lingqiu County, Shanxi. He graduated from the Shijiazhuang Army College in its political department; he holds a master's degree in engineering. He joined the Communist Party in 1980. He then served in a series of military roles in the Beijing Military Region and the Beijing Mobilization District. Then he was transferred to the All China Federation of Supply and Marketing Cooperatives, where he worked as a secretary and then as a supervision official.

In March 2005, Wang became the deputy party chief of Qinzhou, Guangxi. In April 2007 he was named deputy head of the Guangxi Organization Department. In February 2009 he was named party chief of Beihai. In December 2013 he was made a member of the Autonomous Region Party Standing Committee.

On May 26, 2015, he was elevated to party chief of Nanning, replacing the disgraced Yu Yuanhui who had been investigated for corruption.

Party political offices
Previous: Yu Yuanhui	Communist Party Secretary of Nanning; 2015–2021	Succeeded by Xu Hairong
