= Hou Jianguo =

Chinese chemist and politician (born 1959)

- 侯建国

President of Chinese Academy of Sciences
- Incumbent
- Assumed office December 2020
- Preceded by: Bai Chunli

Vice-President of Chinese Academy of Sciences
- In office March 2018 – December 2020
- Preceded by: Liu Weiping
- Succeeded by: Yin Hejun

Party Branch Secretary of General Administration of Quality Supervision, Inspection and Quarantine
- In office June 2017 – March 2018

Deputy Communist Party Secretary of Guangxi
- In office November 2016 – June 2017
- Preceded by: Li Ke
- Succeeded by: Sun Dawei

President of the University of Science and Technology of China
- In office September 2008 – January 2015
- Preceded by: Zhu Qingshi
- Succeeded by: Wan Lijun

Personal details
- Born: October 1959 (age 66–67) Fuqing, Fujian, China
- Party: Chinese Communist Party
- Education: University of Science and Technology of China
- Occupation: Chemist, politician
- Scientific career
- Fields: Nanomaterials; Molecule
- Workplaces: University of Science and Technology of China

Chinese name
- Traditional Chinese: 侯建國
- Simplified Chinese: 侯建国
Transcriptions
Standard Mandarin
- Hanyu Pinyin: Hóu Jiànguó

Hou Jianguo (Chinese: 侯建国; born October 1959) is a Chinese chemist and politician. He served as party secretary of the General Administration of Quality Supervision, Inspection and Quarantine from 2017 to 2018. An accomplished research scientist, Hou is an academician of the Chinese Academy of Sciences and The World Academy of Sciences. He formerly served as president of the University of Science and Technology of China (USTC) and has extensive international work experience.

== Biography ==
Hou was born in Fuqing County, Fujian. He joined the workforce in October 1976 and joined the Chinese Communist Party in December 1985. He is a graduate of the University of Science and Technology of China (USTC) and holds a master's degree in condensed matter physics. Between 1988 and 1995, he conducted research into crystallography and chemistry at the Soviet Academy of Sciences, the Fujian Institute of Research on the Structure of Matter, and at the University of California, Berkeley and Oregon State University.

In 1995, he became a professor at USTC - in charge of the Structural Science Research Lab and dean of the Physics and Chemistry department. In 2000, he was named vice president of the university. In November 2003, he was elected as a member of the Chinese Academy of Sciences. In November 2004, he became a member of The World Academy of Sciences. In September 2005, he was named executive vice president of the USTC, and promoted to president in 2008. On January 24, 2015, he became Deputy Minister of Science and Technology.

In November 2016, he was named deputy party chief of the Guangxi Zhuang Autonomous Region.

In June 2017, he was named party branch secretary and deputy director of the General Administration of Quality Supervision, Inspection and Quarantine.

In March 2018, he became vice-president of Chinese Academy of Sciences, rising to president in December 2020.

== Honours and awards ==
- November 2003 Member of the Chinese Academy of Sciences (CAS)
- November 2004 Member of The World Academy of Sciences (TWAS)
- 2007 Science and Technology Progress Award of the Ho Leung Ho Lee Foundation
- 2008 Chen Kah Kee Prize for Chemical Science
- 2014 Fellow of the Royal Society of Chemistry (FRSC)

Educational offices
Preceded by Zhu Qingshi	President of the University of Science and Technology of China; 2008–2015	Succeeded by Wan Lijun
Party political offices
Preceded by Li Ke	Deputy Communist Party Secretary of Guangxi; 2016-2017	Succeeded by Sun Dawei
Academic offices
Preceded by Liu Weiping	Vice-President of Chinese Academy of Sciences; 2018-2020	Succeeded by Yin Hejun
Preceded by Bai Chunli	President of Chinese Academy of Sciences; 2020	Incumbent
