= University of Science and Technology of China =

Public university in Hefei, Anhui, China

- 中国科学技术大学
- Motto: 红专并进，理实交融
- Motto in English: Being both responsible and professional, integrating theory with practice
- Type: Public university
- Established: 1958; 68 years ago
- Parent institution: Chinese Academy of Sciences
- Affiliations: C9, AEARU, APRU
- President: Chang Jin
- Faculty: 2,621
- Students: 16,718
- Undergraduates: 7,426
- Postgraduates: 9,292
- Location: Hefei, Anhui, China
- Campus: Urban
- Website: ustc.edu.cn en.ustc.edu.cn ustc.edu

Chinese name
- Simplified Chinese: 中国科学技术大学
- Traditional Chinese: 中國科學技術大學
Transcriptions
Standard Mandarin
- Hanyu Pinyin: Zhōngguó Kēxué Jìshù Dàxué
- Wade–Giles: Chungkuo K'ehsüeh Chishu Tahsüeh
Yue: Cantonese
- Jyutping: Zung1 gwok3 fo1 hok6 gei6 seot6 daai6 hok6

Zhongkeda
- Simplified Chinese: 中科大
- Traditional Chinese: 中科大
Transcriptions
Standard Mandarin
- Hanyu Pinyin: Zhōngkēdà

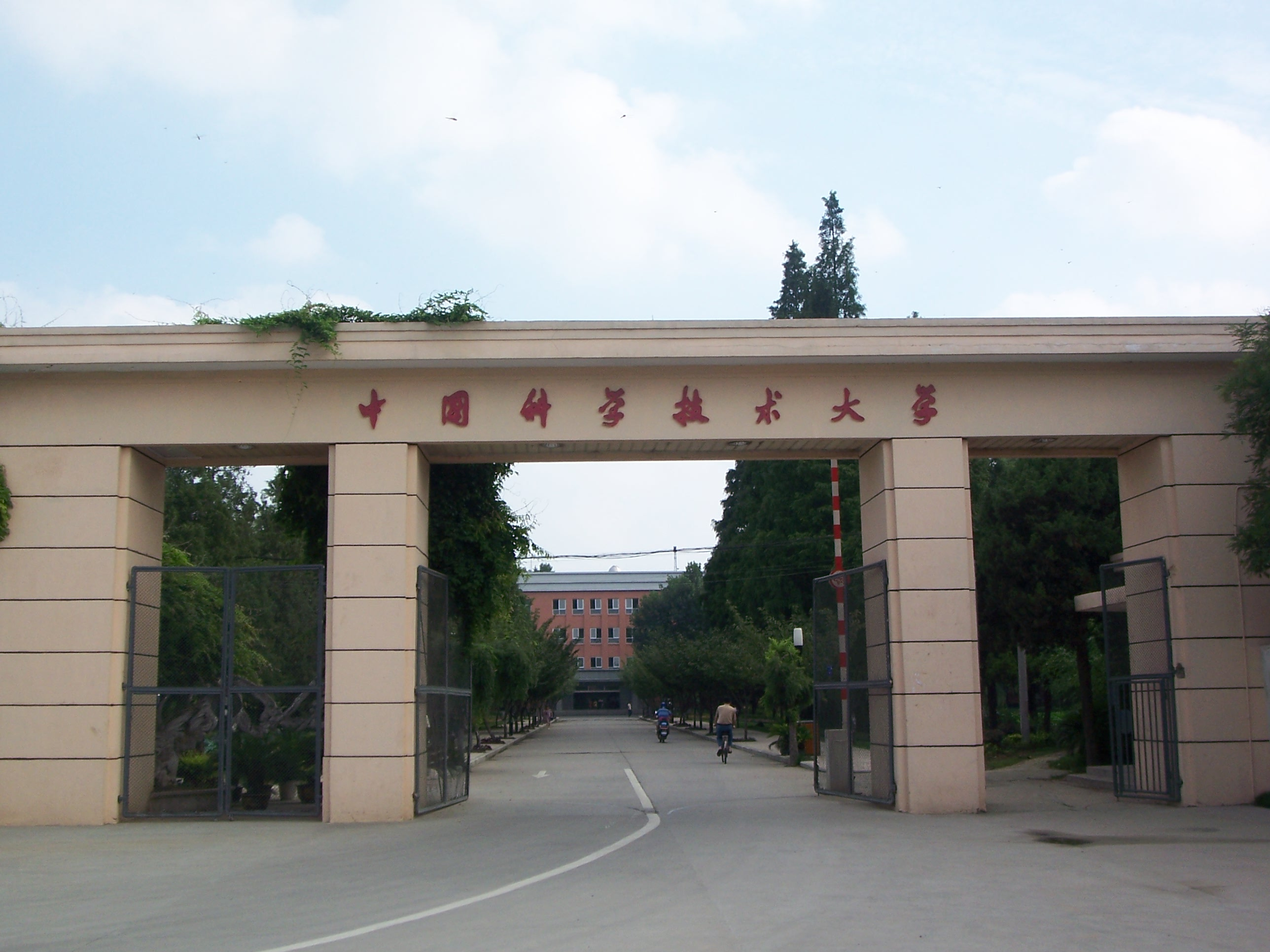
Old North gate of the East Campus

The University of Science and Technology of China (USTC) is a public university in Hefei, Anhui, China. It is owned by the Chinese Academy of Sciences, and co-funded by the Chinese Academy of Sciences, the Ministry of Education of China, and the Anhui Provincial Government. It is part of Project 211, Project 985, and the Double First-Class Construction.

The university was founded in Beijing by the Chinese Academy of Sciences in September 1958. In the beginning of 1970, the university moved to Hefei during the Cultural Revolution. The university has 13 schools, 11 national research platforms, 8 science-education integration colleges, and 5 joint cooperative institutes with local governments. The university is a member of the C9 League.

== History ==
The university was founded in Beijing by the Chinese Academy of Sciences (CAS) in September 1958. The director of CAS, Guo Moruo was appointed the first president of USTC. USTC's founding mission was to develop a high-level science and technology workforce, as deemed critical for the development of China's economy, defense, and science and technology education. The establishment was hailed as "A Major Event in the History of Chinese Education and Science." CAS has supported USTC by combining most of its institutes with the departments of the university. In 1959, USTC was listed in the top 16 national key universities, becoming the youngest national key university.

At the beginning of 1970, the university moved to Hefei during the Cultural Revolution.

In 2012, USTC and the National University of Defense Technology signed a strategic agreement to cooperate on quantum computing research at a ceremony attended by Pan Jianwei and Yang Xuejun.

== Administration ==
- Chang Jin (常进), President
- Shu Gequn (舒歌群), Party Secretary
- Bai Chunli (白春礼), Honorary President

Presidents:

- Guo Moruo, September 1958 – June 1978
- Yan Jici, February 1980 – September 1984
- Guan Weiyan, April 1985 – January 1987
- Teng Teng, January 1987 – February 1988
- Gu Chaohao, February 1988 – July 1993
- Tang Honggao, July 1993 – June 1998
- Zhu Qingshi, June 1998 – September 2008
- Hou Jianguo, September 2008 – January 2015
- Wan Lijun, March 2015 – June 2017
- Bao Xinhe, June 2017 – October 2024
- Chang Jin, October 2024 – present

Honorary President:

- Zhou Guangzhao, August 1998 – August 2024

== Present ==
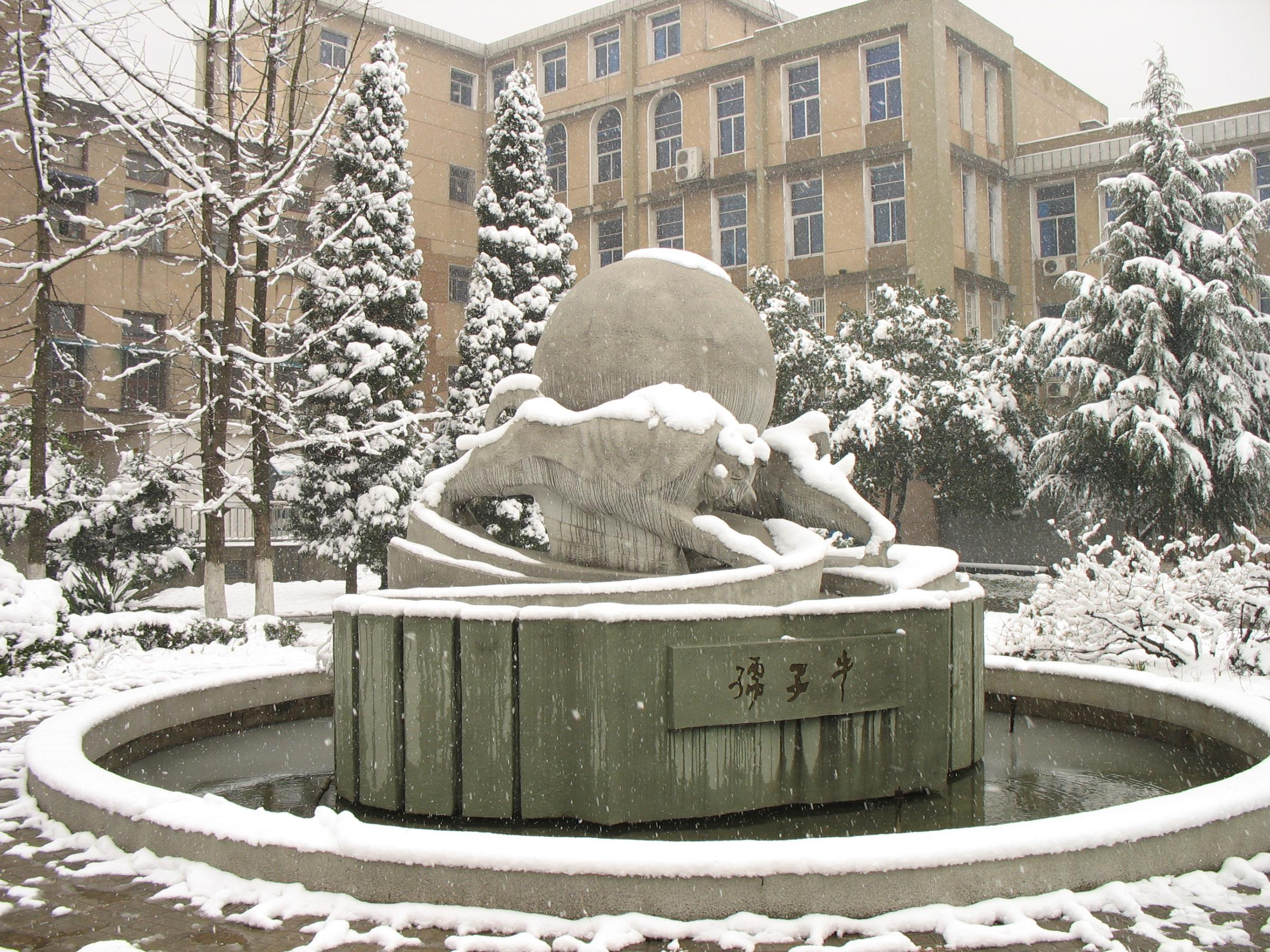
A sculpture near the old library on the East Campus

Since its participation in the CAS Experimental Program of Knowledge Innovation, USTC has achieved a batch of results in the basic research of nano science and technology, quantum information science, life science research, fire science, and fire protection technology, polar scientific investigation and research, bio-mass clean energy research.

=== Rankings and reputation ===
==== General rankings ====
University rankings
BCUR National	Domestic	7
Wu Shulian National	Domestic	16
CUAA National	Alumni	9
QS National	General	7
THE National	General	6
QS Asia (Asia version)	General	31
THE Asia (Asia version)	General	11
ARWU World	Research	39
QS World	General	=132
THE World	General	51
USNWR World	General	59

USTC is generally considered one of the most competitive universities in the country, and consistently ranked among the top universities in Asia according to several major international university rankings. The joint THE-QS World University Rankings 2005 ranked USTC 4th in China (after Peking, Tsinghua and Fudan), 13th in Asia and 93rd in the world. The Times Higher Education World University Rankings 2011 placed USTC 49th in the world, 7th in Asia and 2nd in China after Peking. It ranked 10th in Asia and 4th in Emerging countries & Mainland China in 2020 by Times Higher Education.

As of 2025, the Times Higher Education World University Rankings ranked USTC #6 in China, #11 in Asia and #51 in the world. The Academic Ranking of World Universities (ARWU), also known as the "Shanghai Ranking", placed USTC 39th in the world, 6th in Asia, and 5th in China. The 2026 US News Best Global Universities ranked USTC #59 overall in the world, #13 in Asia and #7 in mainland China. USTC is regarded as one of the most reputable Chinese universities by the Times Higher Education World Reputation Rankings where they ranked 51–60th globally.

USTC was ranked # 6 in China, # 12 in Asia and #62 worldwide in 2025 in terms of aggregate performance from the four most widely observed university rankings (THE+ARWU+QS+US News).

==== Research strength and subject rankings ====
The Nature Index Research Leaders 2025, which measures the largest groups of papers published in 145 leading high-quality science journals, ranked USTC the No.1 university in China and the Asia-Pacific region, and 2nd in the world among the global universities (after Harvard). In 2025, USTC was ranked 59th globally by the Performance Ranking of Scientific Papers for World Universities, with "Natural Science" & "Engineering"-related fields ranked 3rd and 8th, respectively, in the world.

In the 2024 ARWU Global Ranking of Academic Subjects, the USTC had seven disciplines in the world's top 20, 17 disciplines in the world's top 50 and 21 disciplines in the world's top 100.

ARWU Subject	2024 Ranking
Nanoscience & Nanotechnology	1
Chemistry	6
Chemical Engineering	7
Energy Science & Engineering	7
Metallurgical Engineering	9
Materials Science & Engineering	12
Earth Sciences	15
Computer Science & Engineering	23
Physics	23
Instruments Science & Technology	28
Automation & Control	30
Mechanical Engineering	35
Telecommunication Engineering	35
Biomedical Engineering	37
Electrical & Electronic Engineering	41
Library & Information Science	41
Environmental Science & Engineering	50
Mathematics	51–75
Transportation Science & Technology	51–75
Biotechnology	76–100
Statistics	76–100
Atmospheric Science	101-150
Management	101-150
Civil Engineering	151-200
Human Biological Sciences	151-200
Business Administration	201-300
Pharmacy & Pharmaceutical Sciences	201-300
Biological Sciences	301-400
Economics	301-400
Medical Technology	301-400

==== Times Higher Education (THE) ====
Year	Rank	Valuer
2021	70	Times Higher Education Top Universities With Best Student-To-Staff Ratio
2022	68	Times Higher Education Top Universities With Best Student-To-Staff Ratio

==== Nature Index ====
Nature Index tracks the affiliations of high-quality scientific articles and presents research outputs by institution and country on a monthly basis.

Year	Rank	Valuer
2022	328	Nature Index 2022 – Leading 500 institutions by patent influence metric
2025	2	Nature Index – Academic Institutions – Global
2025	1	Nature Index – Academic Institutions – Asia-Pacific

== Laboratories ==
Only the National Laboratories, State Key Laboratories, and Key Laboratories of the Chinese Academy of Sciences are listed below, among which the National Laboratories have the highest qualification. USTC is the only university in mainland China with two National Laboratories.

National Laboratories (2)

- The National Synchrotron Radiation Laboratory
- Hefei National Laboratory for Physical Sciences at the Microscale (under construction).

State Key Laboratories and Ministerial Level Units

- The State Key Laboratory of Fire Science (SKLFS)
- National High Performance Computing Center (Hefei)
- National Engineering Laboratory of Speech and Language Information Processing
- The State Key Laboratory of Particle Detection and Electronics (Under Construction)
- Mengcheng National Geophysical Observatory
- Microsoft Key Laboratory of Multimedia Computing and Communications, Ministry of Education

Key Laboratories of the Chinese Academy of Sciences

- The Key Laboratory of Bond Selective Chemistry, Chinese Academy of Sciences
- The Key Laboratory of Wu Wenjun Mathematics, Chinese Academy of Sciences
- The Key Laboratory of Quantum Information, Chinese Academy of Sciences
- The Engineering & Technology Research Center for Thermal Safety, Chinese Academy of Sciences
- The Key Laboratory of Material Mechanical Behavior and Material Design, Chinese Academy of Sciences
- The Key Laboratory of Structural Analysis, Chinese Academy of Sciences
- The Key Laboratory of Structural Biology, Chinese Academy of Sciences
- The Key Laboratory of Crust-Mantle Materials and Environment, Chinese Academy of Sciences
- Strong Magnetic Field Research Center, Chinese Academy of Sciences
- The Key Laboratory of Basic Plasma Physics, Chinese Academy of Sciences
- The Key Laboratory of Energy Conversion Materials, Chinese Academy of Sciences
- The Key Laboratory of Galaxies and Cosmology, Chinese Academy of Sciences
- The Network Communication System and Control Laboratory, Chinese Academy of Sciences (training building)
- The Key Laboratory of Soft Matter Chemistry, Chinese Academy of Sciences
- The Key Laboratory of Brain Function and Brain Disease, Chinese Academy of Sciences
- The Key Laboratory of Electromagnetic, Space, and Information, Chinese Academy of Sciences
- The Research Center of Solar Thermal Conversion, Chinese Academy of Sciences
- The Quantum Technology and Application Research Center, Chinese Academy of Sciences

== Schools and departments ==
Highlights: USTC set up the first graduate school in China in 1978 to effectively cultivate its postgraduate students.

- School for the Gifted Young
- School of Mathematical Sciences
- School of Physical Sciences
  - Department of Modern Physics
  - Department of Astronomy
  - Department of Physics
  - Department of Optics and Optical Engineering
  - Physics Experiment Teaching Center
- School of Chemistry and Materials Science
  - Department of Chemistry
  - Department of Chemical Physics
  - Department of Materials Science and Engineering
  - Department of Polymer Science and Engineering
  - Chemical Experimental Teaching Center
- School of Nuclear Science and Technology
- School of Life Sciences and Medicine
  - Molecular Biology and Cell Biology
  - Neurobiology and Biophysics
  - Systems Biology
  - Biomedicine and Biotechnology
- School of Engineering Science
  - Modern Mechanics
  - Thermal Science and Energy Engineering
  - Precision Machinery and Instrumentation
- School of Information Science and Technology
  - Electronic Science and Technology
  - Automation
  - Electrical Engineering and Information Science
  - Information Security
- School of Computer Science and Technology
  - Computer Science and Technology
- School of Earth and Space Science
  - Earth and Space Science
  - Faculty of Geochemistry and Environmental Science
- School of Software Engineering
- School of Management
  - Statistics and Finance
  - Management Science
  - Business Management (Information Management and Decision Science)
- Humanities and Social Science
  - Sci-tech Communication and Sci-tech Policy
  - The Teaching and Research Division of Marxism
  - Scientific History and Archaeometry
  - Center for Modern Art
- School of Environment Science and Electrooptical Technology
- School of Material Science and Engineering
- Suzhou Institute for Advanced Study, USTC
- Shanghai Institute for Advanced Studies, USTC
- Institute of Advanced Technology, USTC
- Continuing Education

== Notable people ==
=== Alumni ===
- Di Wei, research fellow at the University of Cambridge

=== Notable faculty members ===
- Zhou Guangzhao (1929–2024) – Famous theoretical physicist, Vice-chairman of the Standing Committee of the National People's Congress of China, Honorary President of USTC at present.
- Yan Jici (1901–1996) – Pioneer of Modern physics research and education in China, former Vice-President, President, and Honorary President of USTC.
- Qian Linzhao (1906–1999) – Famous physicist and educator, pioneer of scientific history and education in China, former Vice-president of USTC.
- Hua Luogeng (1910–1985) – Pioneer of modern mathematics research and education in China, former Chairman of the Department of Mathematics and Vice-president of USTC.
- Guo Moruo (1892–1978) – A Chinese author, poet, historian, archaeologist, the first president of USTC.
- Meng Xuenong (1948–) – Former Mayor of Beijing, and former Governor of Shanxi Province
- Qian Xuesen (1911–2009) – Father of missiles of China, former Chairman of the Department of Mechanics with USTC.
- Zhao Zhongyao (1902–1998) – Pioneer of modern particle physics research and education in China, one of the first in the world to find positrons, former Chairman of the Department of Modern Physics with USTC.

== See also ==
- University of the Chinese Academy of Sciences
- ShanghaiTech University
- Science and technology in China
- List of universities and colleges in Anhui
- List of universities in China
