= Bai Chunli =

Chinese chemist (born 1953)

Bai Chunli 白春礼 ForMemRS HonFRSC HonFRSE
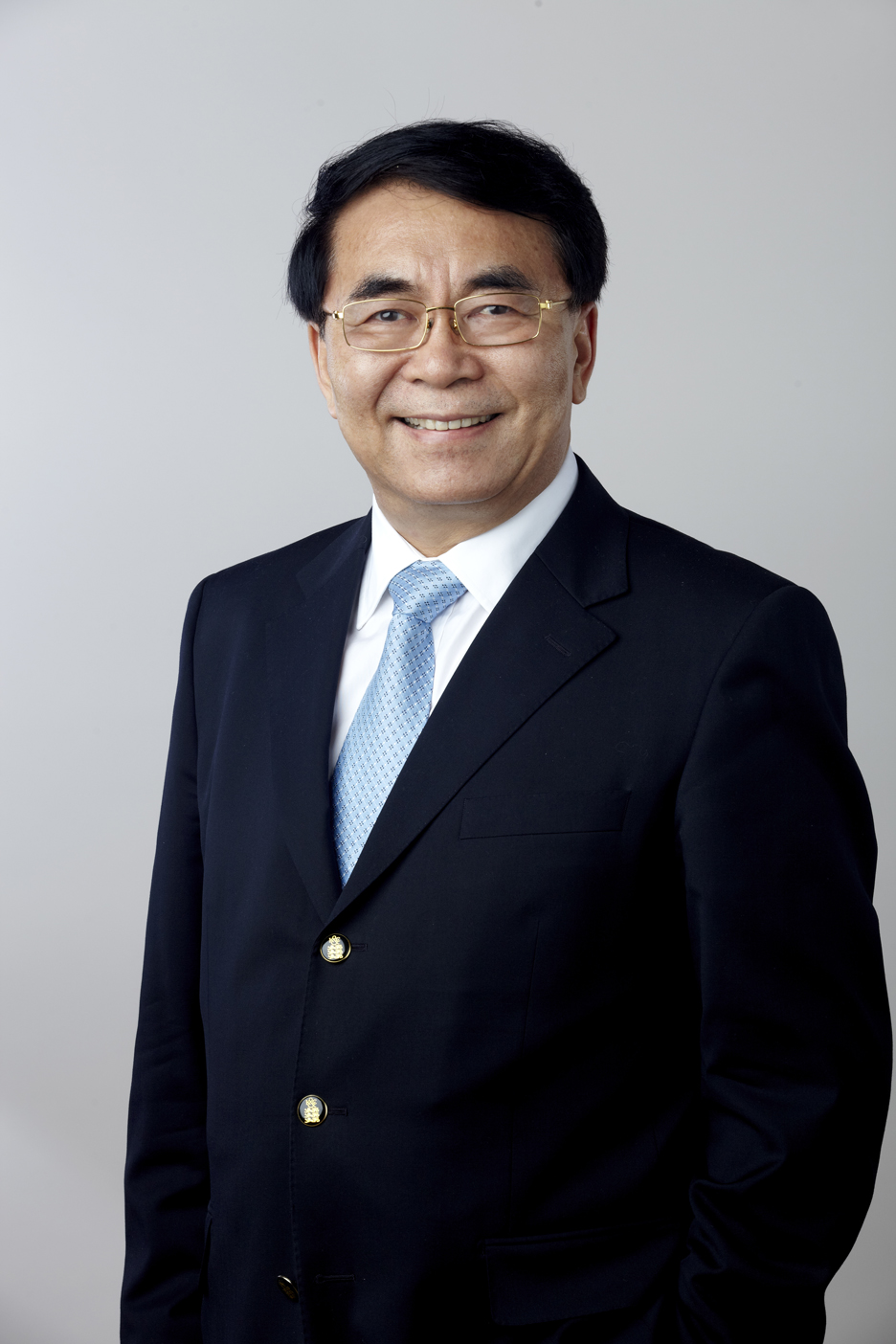
- Bai Chunli in 2014, portrait via the Royal Society
- Born: September 26, 1953 (age 72); Dandong, Liaoning, China
- Education: Peking University (UG); Chinese Academy of Sciences (MS, DSc)
- Awards: HonFRSC (2007); ForMemRS (2014)
- Scientific career
- Fields: Nanoscience; Chemistry; Scanning probe microscopy
- Workplaces: California Institute of Technology; Jet Propulsion Laboratory; Chinese Academy of Sciences
- Website: royalsociety.org/chunli-bai ustc.edu.cn/info

Bai Chunli (Chinese: 白春礼; born September 26, 1953) is a Chinese physical chemist, nanotechnology scientist, and academic administrator. He is a professor at the Chinese Academy of Sciences Institute of Chemistry.

In academia, Bai served as president of the Chinese Academy of Sciences from 2011 to 2020 and as president of the University of the Chinese Academy of Sciences from 2001 to 2014. In organizations, Bai served as president of the World Academy of Sciences from 2012 to 2018, as vice chairperson of the China Association for Science and Technology from 2001 to 2011, and as chairperson of the Chinese Chemical Society from 1999 to 2010.

Bai is honorary president of the University of Science and Technology of China and of the University of the Chinese Academy of Sciences.

== Early life and education ==
Bai Chunli's father was a teacher in a public elementary school before the Civil War. When Bai was young, his father taught and explained ancient poems and their messages to Bai. In 1966, Bai Chunli went to middle school, and after only 4 years of study, he got a high school diploma. Graduating from high school during the Cultural Revolution, Bai joined the Down to the Countryside Movement with other young people. He worked at the Inner Mongolia production and construction corps mechanical transport company as a driver and clerical staff from September 1970 to September 1974.

In 1974, after three rounds of secret balloting for the soldiers of the whole company, and later taking written examinations, Bai Chunli became an undergraduate student of Peking University as a "worker, peasant and soldier student with practical experience."

In January 1978, Bai graduated from Peking University Department of Chemistry with a major in catalysis. In October 1978, He was admitted to the Chinese Academy of Sciences Institute of Chemistry, where he received a Master of Science in structural chemistry in 1981 and a Doctor of Science in 1985.

== Career ==
In January 1978, after graduating from the university, Bai Chunli was assigned to the Chinese Academy of Sciences' applied chemistry department, which was the beginning of his research career in the Chinese Academy of Sciences. From 1985 to 1987, he did postdoctoral research in the Jet Propulsion Laboratory at the California Institute of Technology. In 1996, he was the Vice President of the Chinese Academy of Sciences; in 2011, he took over from Lu Yongxiang as sixth President of Chinese Academy of Sciences, succeeded by Hou Jianguo in December 2020.

As of 2014 Bai is currently a part-time professor at Peking University, Tsinghua University, University of Science and Technology of China, Nankai University, and the China University of Geosciences, and a visiting professor at Liaoning Normal University and Nanjing Audit University.

He is also editor-in-chief of the journal National Science Review.

== Research ==
Bai's research is mainly in the field of nanotechnology and scanning tunneling microscopy, where his work focuses on scanning probe microscopy techniques, and molecular nano-structure, as well as nanotechnology research. He has published a large number of books in both Chinese and English. He was an alternate committee member of the 15th and the 16th CPC Central Committee, and the sixth Vice President of the China Association for Science and Technology.

Bai conducted research in areas such as polymer catalyst structure and property, organic compounds of crystal structure X-ray diffraction, molecular mechanics and conductive polymers of EXAFS, etc. He has been engaged in the study of scanning tunneling microscopy, which has been a significant field in nanotechnology (NT), since the mid-1980s. Many of his works, both in Chinese and English, have been published by Germany Springer Publish Company and Scientific Company and many other publishing houses. Furthermore, he has earned many other awards such as Internationalism which is awarded by the International Chemical Industry association.

Bai Chunli is one of the pioneers in the field of scanning probe microscopy. The laboratory he leads organized much wide-ranging and detailed research. Bai has made many contributions to STM study nationally and internationally. He has created a team which aims to increase cooperation between China and the United States on the issue of regularly using energy sources. Bai has also devoted himself to shortening the scientific distance between China and foreign countries.

He is the editor of China Basic Science magazine, and plays an important role in the political field. In his youth, he was named the best worker around China and one of China's Top Ten Outstanding Young Persons among other distinctions.

His research has been published widely in peer reviewed journals and books.

== Awards and honors ==
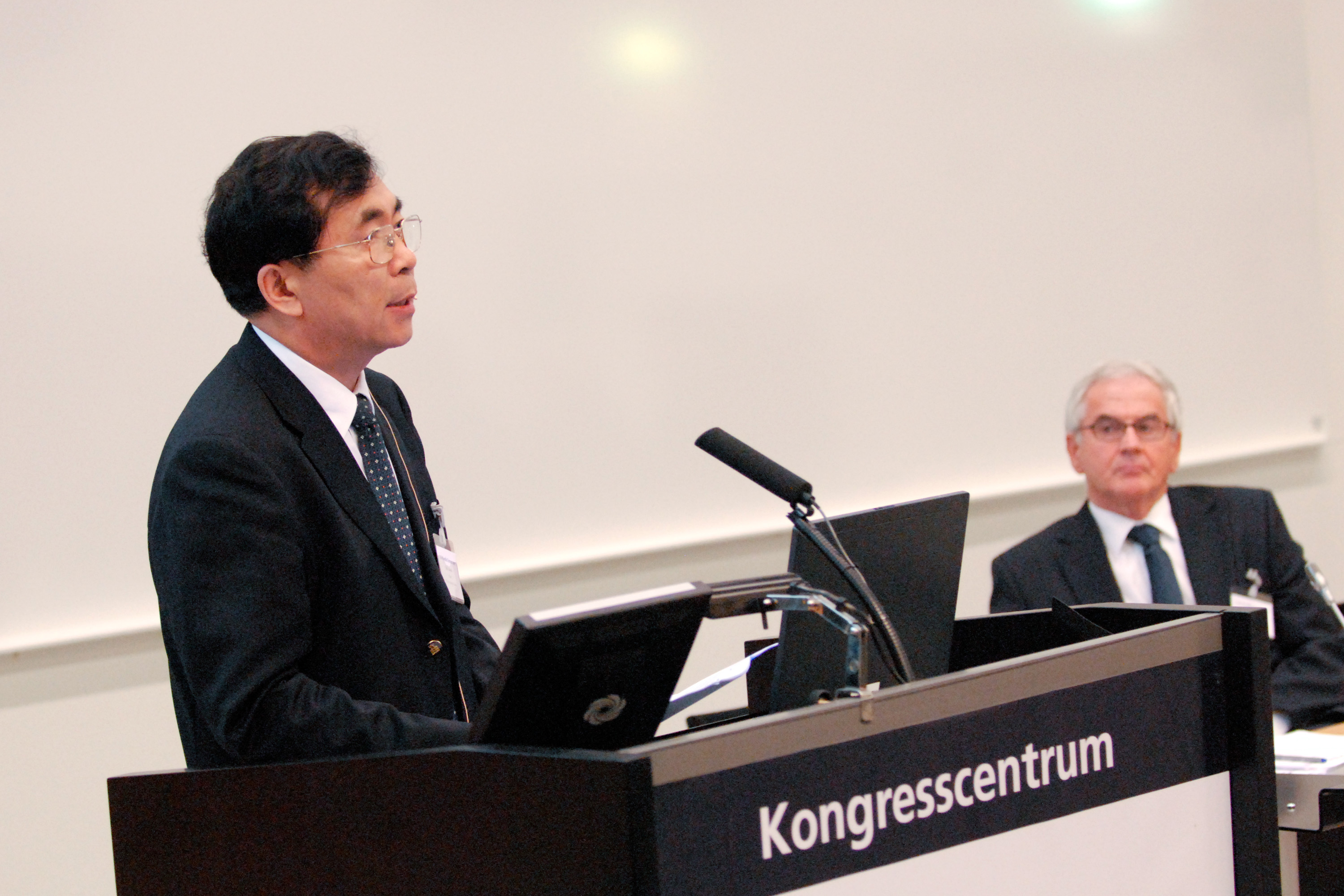
Chunli Bai at the opening of CAS Nordic in Lund in 2007

- Academician of The World Academy of Sciences in 1997
- Academician of the Chinese Academy of Sciences in 1997
- International Member of the United States National Academy of Sciences in 2006
- Honorary Fellow of the Royal Society of Chemistry (HonFRSC) in 2007
- Foreign Academician of the Russian Academy of Sciences in 2008
- Honorary Fellow of the Indian Academy of Sciences in 2009
- Corresponding Member of the Australian Academy of Science in 2013
- Laureate of the Asian Scientist 100, Asian Scientist, 2016 and 2022
- Honorary Member of Chinese Association for Science and Technology in 2011
- Foreign Member of the Royal Society (ForMemRS) in 2014
- Honorary Fellow of the Royal Society of Edinburgh (HonFRSE) in 2015
- Honorary President of the University of Science and Technology of China
- Honorary President of the University of Chinese Academy of Sciences

His nomination for the Royal Society reads:

Dr. Chunli Bai is one of the pioneers in the field of nanoscience. In the mid-1980s, he successfully designed and developed China's first atomic force microscope (AFM), scanning tunneling microscope (STM), low-temperature STM, ultrahigh vacuum-STM, and ballistic electron emission microscope. These led to the earliest technological tools in the country for manipulating single atoms and molecules, and characterizing surfaces and interfaces. He successfully established a methodology for the study of molecular assembly on solid substrate surfaces, such as the imaging of functional molecules on graphite surfaces. His use of alkane-assisted adsorption and assembly in this context is particularly noteworthy. Beyond his outstanding scientific achievements, Dr. Bai's leadership role in Chinese science includes service as the President of the Chinese Chemical Society (1998–2010), and Vice-President (1996–2004), Executive Vice-President (2004–2011) and President (2011–present) of the Chinese Academy of Sciences (CAS). In 2012 he became the first Chinese President of the Academy of Sciences for the Developing World (TWAS).
