= Chen Wu (politician) =

Chinese politician (1954–2026)

Chen Wu Cinz Muz
- 陈武
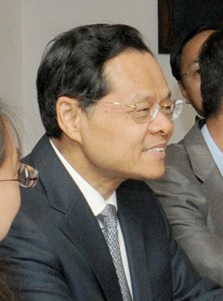
- Chen in 2015

Vice Chairman of the Chinese People's Political Consultative Conference
- In office 10 March 2023 – 24 August 2026
- Chairman: Wang Huning

Deputy Director of the Financial and Economic Committee of the National People's Congress
- In office 11 November 2020 – 5 March 2023

Chairman of Guangxi
- In office 28 March 2013 – 19 October 2020
- Preceded by: Ma Biao
- Succeeded by: Lan Tianli

Deputy Party Secretary of Guangxi
- In office March 2013 – October 2020
- Preceded by: Ma Biao

Party Secretary of Nanning
- In office September 2011 – April 2013
- Preceded by: Che Rongfu
- Succeeded by: Yu Yuanhui

Personal details
- Born: November 1954 Chongzuo, Guangxi, China
- Died: 24 August 2026 (aged 71)
- Party: Chinese Communist Party
- Education: Guangxi University

Chinese name
- Traditional Chinese: 陳武
- Simplified Chinese: 陈武
Transcriptions
Standard Mandarin
- Hanyu Pinyin: Chén Wǔ

Chen Wu (Chinese: 陈武; November 1954 – 24 August 2026) was a Chinese politician who served as a vice chairman of the Chinese People's Political Consultative Conference. Previously, he served as the Chairman (Governor) and Deputy Party Secretary of the Guangxi Autonomous Region, and later as a deputy director of the Financial and Economic Committee of the National People's Congress. He was a member of the Zhuang minority.

== Life and career ==
Chen Wu was born in November 1954, and was a native of Chongzuo, Guangxi. He entered the work force in October 1972, working at a rice factory in Nanning, the capital of Guangxi. Chen joined the Chinese Communist Party in February 1975. He entered Guangxi University in January 1978, earning a bachelor's degree in philosophy in 1982.

After university Chen spent his entire career working for the government of Guangxi. In December 2005 he was promoted to be the Vice Chairman of Guangxi, and in September 2011 he became the Communist Party Chief of the regional capital Nanning. In March 2013 Chen Wu was appointed Acting Chairman and Deputy Communist Party Chief of Guangxi, and was made Chairman the following month. On 11 November 2020, he was appointed deputy director of the Financial and Economic Committee of the National People's Congress.

Chen was an alternate of the 18th Central Committee of the Chinese Communist Party.

Chen died on 24 August 2026, at the age of 71.

Party political offices
Preceded by Che Rongfu	Party Secretary of Nanning; 2011–2013	Succeeded by Yu Yuanhui
Government offices
Preceded by Ma Biao	Chairman of Guangxi; 2013–2020	Succeeded by Lan Tianli
