= Li Zhaozhuo =

Chinese politician

Li Zhaozhuo (Chinese: 李兆焯; Zhuang: Leix Ciucuek; born September 1944) is a politician of the People's Republic of China. He currently serves as vice chairman of the 11th Chinese People's Political Consultative Conference (CPPCC).

Born in Pingguo County, Guangxi Province, Li belongs to the Zhuang nationality. He graduated from the department of civil engineering of Guangxi University, majoring in agricultural hydraulic engineering. He started working in September 1968, and joined the Chinese Communist Party (CCP) in June 1974. He then served in various posts in Guangxi Zhuang Autonomous Region. Li was eventually elevated to the post of secretary of the CCP Nanning municipal committee, and later vice secretary of the CCP Guangxi committee. In 1998, the former Party chief, Cheng Kejie, was sentenced to capital punishment after engaging in extensive bribery. Li was chosen to succeed him as the secretary of the CCP Guangxi committee. He retired from this post in March 2003. Since then, he has served as vice chairman of the CPPCC.

Li was a member of the 15th and 16th Central Committees of the Chinese Communist Party, and is a current member of the 17th Central Committee. He has been the vice chairman of the 10th and 11th CPPCC.
