= Lan Tianli =

Chinese politician (born 1962)

Lan Tianli Laemz Tienz Liz
- 蓝天立
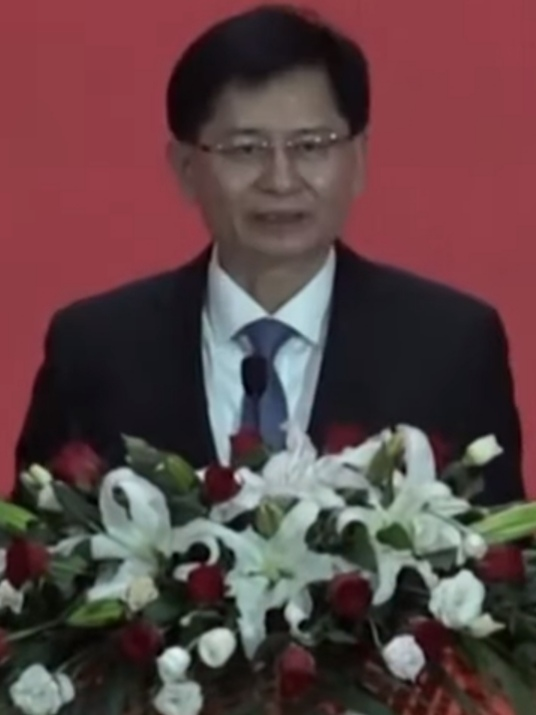

Chairman of Guangxi
- In office 19 October 2020 – 29 May 2025
- Preceded by: Chen Wu
- Succeeded by: Wei Tao

Chairman of the Guangxi Zhuang Autonomous Regional Committee of the Chinese People's Political Consultative Conference
- In office January 2018 – January 2021
- Preceded by: Chen Jiwa
- Succeeded by: Sun Dawei

Vice Chairman of Guangxi
- In office August 2016 – January 2018
- Preceded by: Tang Renjian
- Succeeded by: Qin Rupei

Communist Party Secretary of Hechi
- In office January 2008 – December 2011
- Preceded by: Yang Caishou
- Succeeded by: Huang Shiyong

Mayor of Hechi
- In office April 2007 – February 2008
- Preceded by: Yang Caishou
- Succeeded by: Xie Zhigang

Personal details
- Born: October 1962 (age 64) Yizhou District, Hechi, Guangxi, China
- Party: Chinese Communist Party (1985-2025, expelled)
- Education: Guangxi University for Nationalities; Guangxi University; Beihang University

Chinese name
- Traditional Chinese: 藍天立
- Simplified Chinese: 蓝天立
Transcriptions
Standard Mandarin
- Hanyu Pinyin: Lán Tiānlì
Yue: Cantonese
- Jyutping: Laam4 Tin1-lap6

Zhuang name
- Zhuang: Lanz Denhliz

Lan Tianli (Chinese: 蓝天立; born October 1962) is a Chinese politician who previously served as chairman and deputy party secretary of Guangxi and chairman of the Guangxi Zhuang Autonomous Regional Committee of the Chinese People's Political Consultative Conference. He is of Zhuang ethnicity. He was an alternate of the 19th Central Committee of the Chinese Communist Party. In October 2026, Lan was expelled from the Chinese Communist Party.

== Early life and education ==
Lan was born in Yizhou District, Hechi, Guangxi, in October 1962. He taught at local schools since 1980. After graduating from Guangxi University for Nationalities in 1987, he was dispatched to the Science and Technology Commission of Guangxi Zhuang Autonomous Region, where he was promoted to its director in 2003. After receiving his master's degree in political economics from Guangxi University in 1996, he earned his doctor's degree in management science and engineering from Beihang University. In 2007, he earned a master's degree in public administration at Nanyang Technological University in Singapore.

== Political career ==
Lan served as deputy party chief and mayor of Hechi in 2007, and was promoted to the party chief position one year later. In 2011 he became vice-chairman of the Guangxi Zhuang Autonomous Regional Committee of the Chinese People's Political Consultative Conference, rising to chairman in 2018. In October 2020, the Central Committee of the Chinese Communist Party appointed him deputy party secretary of Guangxi. On October 19, he was elected chairman at the 19th session of the Standing Committee of the 13th People's Congress of Guangxi Zhuang Autonomous Region.

On May 16, 2025, Lan was suspected of "serious violations of laws and regulations" by the Central Commission for Discipline Inspection (CCDI), the party's internal disciplinary body, and the National Supervisory Commission, the highest anti-corruption agency of China. Lan was resigned from the Chairman of Guangxi post by the Standing Committee of Guangxi People's Congress on May 29. On December 4, 2025, Lan was expelled from the Party and public office. On 29 October 2026, the fifth plenary session of the 20th CCP Central Committee reviewed and approved the report of the CCDI on the "serious violations of discipline and law" by Lan and confirmed the Politburo decision to expel him from the CCP.

Government offices
Preceded by Zhang Zhengyou	Director of the Department of Science and Technology of Guangxi Zhuang Autonomous Region; 2003–2007	Succeeded by Chen Dake (陈大克)
Preceded by Yang Caishou (杨才寿)	Mayor of Hechi; 2007–2008	Succeeded by Xie Zhigang (谢志刚)
Preceded by Tang Renjian	Vice Chairman of Guangxi; 2016–2018	Succeeded by Qin Rupei
Preceded by Chen Wu	Chairman of Guangxi; 2020–2025	Succeeded by Wei Tao
Party political offices
Preceded by Yang Caishou (杨才寿)	Party Secretary of Hechi; 2008–2011	Succeeded by Huang Shiyong
Assembly seats
Preceded by Chen Jiwa	Chairman of the Guangxi Zhuang Autonomous Regional Committee of the Chinese People's Political Consultative Conference; 2018–2021	Succeeded by Sun Dawei
