= Lu Bing =

Chinese politician

Lu Bing (Chinese: 陆兵; Zhuang: Luz Bing; born October 1944), is an ethnic Zhuang politician from the People's Republic of China. He served as chairman of the Guangxi Zhuang Autonomous Region between 2004 and 2007.

== Biography ==
Born in Wuming, Guangxi, Lu graduated from department of history of Guangxi Normal College in September 1968, and joined the Chinese Communist Party (CCP) in October 1976. He holds the title of senior economist.

Lu briefly served in an army farm in Jiangyong County of Hunan Province. Since March 1970, he had served in various posts in Guangxi. From January 1993 to December 1997, Lu was the vice chairman of Guangxi. From March to July 1995, he studied at CCP Central Party School. In December 1997, he became the vice secretary of CCP Guangxi committee, and in May 1998, he was also appointed as the secretary of political and legislative affairs commission of Guangxi. From September to December 2000, he again studied at CCP Central Party School. In April 2003, Lu became the vice chairman and acting chairman of Guangxi. He was confirmed as chairman of the Autonomous Region in January 2004, and served until December 2007. In March 2008, Lu was appointed as vice chair of Ethnic Affairs Committee of the 11th National People's Congress.

Lu was a member of the 17th Central Committee of the Chinese Communist Party (he was the only ethnic Zhuang with a full seat on the committee), and a member of the Standing Committee of the 11th National People's Congress.
