= Wei Tao =

Chinese executive and politician

Wei Tao Veiz Dauh
- 韦韬

Chairman of the Guangxi Zhuang Autonomous Region People's Government
- Incumbent
- Assumed office 3 July 2025
- Deputy: Xu Yongke (executive vice chairman)
- Preceded by: Lan Tianli

Communist Party Secretary of Taiyuan
- In office November 2021 – July 2025
- Deputy: Zhang Xinwei; Fan Zhaosen (mayor)
- Preceded by: Luo Qingyu
- Succeeded by: Lin Hongyu

Personal details
- Born: April 1970 (age 56) Luocheng Mulao Autonomous County, Guangxi, China
- Party: Chinese Communist Party
- Education: Chongqing University; Huazhong University of Science and Technology

Chinese name
- Simplified Chinese: 韦韬
- Traditional Chinese: 韋濤
Transcriptions
Standard Mandarin
- Hanyu Pinyin: Wéi Tāo

Wei Tao (Chinese: 韦韬; born April 1970) is a Chinese politician of Zhuang ethnicity, currently serving as acting chairman of the Guangxi Zhuang Autonomous Region People's Government, in office since July 2025. Previously, he served as party secretary of Taiyuan.

He was a delegate to the 13th National People's Congress. He is a representative of the 20th National Congress of the Chinese Communist Party and an alternate of the 20th Central Committee of the Chinese Communist Party.

== Early life and education ==
Wei was born in Luocheng Mulao Autonomous County, Guangxi, in April 1970. In 1988, he entered Chongqing University, where he majored in ferrous metallurgy.

== Career ==
After university in 1992, he joined Liuzhou Steel, where he successively served as a technician, assistant engineer, engineer, deputy director of the Technical Center, deputy manager of the Distribution Company, and director of the Ironmaking Plant. He joined the Chinese Communist Party (CCP) in May 1998. In April 2010, he rose to become deputy general manager.

In January 2016, he was appointed deputy secretary, vice chairman and general manager of Guangxi Beibu Gulf International Port Group Co., Ltd.

He got involved in politics in December 2017, when he was made deputy party secretary of Yulin. He served as mayor from January the next year.

In March 2020, he was transferred back to Guangxi Beibu Gulf International Port Group Co., Ltd. and appointed party secretary and chairman.

Wei was chosen as vice governor of Shanxi in February 2021 and was admitted to member of the CCP Shanxi Provincial Committee, the province's top authority. In February 2021, he was elevated to vice governor of Shanxi, but having held the position for only eight months. In November 2021, he became party secretary of the capital city Taiyuan, his first foray into a prefectural leadership role.

In July 2025, Wei was appointed as acting chairman of the Guangxi Zhuang Autonomous Region People's Government.

Government offices
Preceded by Su Haitang	Mayor of Yulin; 2018–2020	Succeeded by Bai Songtao
Preceded by Lan Tianli	Chairman of Guangxi; 2025–present	Incumbent
Business positions
Preceded by Zhou Xiaoxi	Chairman of Guangxi Beibu Gulf International Port Group Co., Ltd. 2020–2021	Succeeded by Li Yanqiang
Party political offices
Preceded by Luo Qingyu	Communist Party Secretary of Taiyuan; 2021–2025	Succeeded by Lin Hongyu
