= Guan Weiyan =

Guan Weiyan (Chinese: 管惟炎; August 18, 1928 – March 20, 2003) was a Chinese physicist. He was a member of the Chinese Academy of Sciences.
