= Helio Aircraft Company =

US aircraft manufacturing company

- Industry: Aerospace
- Founded: 1948
- Founders: Lynn Bollinger; Otto C. Koppen
- Defunct: 1985
- Headquarters: United States
- Parent: General Aircraft Corporation (1969–1976)

The Helio Aircraft Company was an American aircraft manufacturer founded in 1948.

== History ==
The Koppen-Bollinger Aircraft Corporation was founded by Otto Koppen and Lynn Bollinger in Massachusetts in 1948 to develop a light STOL utility aircraft. Initially located at Boston Metropolitan Airport in Canton, Massachusetts, it was renamed the Helio Aircraft Corporation by the time manufacture of the Helio Courier commenced in the early 1950s at a plant in Pittsburg, Kansas. The plant, located at the Atkinson Municipal Airport was acquired by Helio from Mid-States Manufacturing Company in July 1956 and was almost destroyed by a wildfire in March 1966. In 1959, the company announced it was moving its factory to Tucson, Arizona.

The business was bought by the General Aircraft Corporation in 1969, was renamed Helio Aircraft Company and continued production until 1974, when General Aircraft commenced legal proceedings against the CIA, alleging that the agency had planned to ruin the business through organizing unlicensed production of the Courier.

The production rights were sold by General Aircraft to Helio Aircraft Ltd in 1977. Despite an abortive attempt to restart production, the company remained essentially inactive until 1980. The Courier was returned to production, but only 18 aircraft were built. In 1984, the company was forced to lay off 100 workers and the following February it was evicted from its factory.

The rights to the Courier and Stallion were bought and sold a number of times more before being purchased by Helio Aircraft LLC of Prescott, Arizona, which announced plans in 2004 to return both types to production.

== Aircraft ==
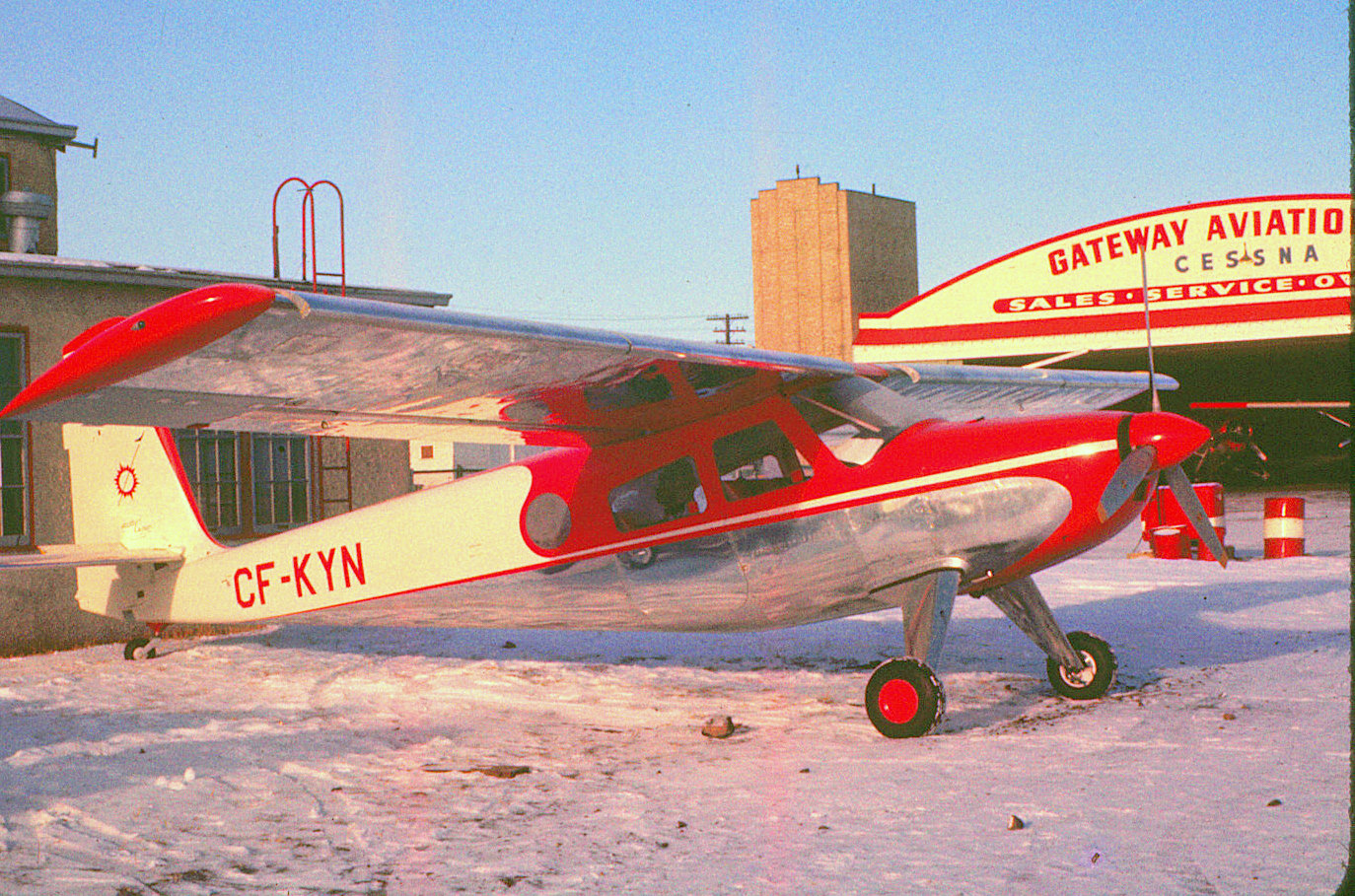
A Helio Courier at Edmonton, circa 1959

Model name	First flight	Number built	Type
Helio Courier		~500	Single engine utility airplane
Helio H-500 Twin Courier	1960	7	Twin engine utility airplane
Helio HST-550 Stallion	1964	20	Single engine utility airplane
Helio Rat'ler		1	Single engine agricultural airplane
