= General Aircraft Corporation =

General Aircraft Company
- Industry: Aerospace
- Founder: Harris Fahnestock; Otto C. Koppen
- Headquarters: Lowell, Massachusetts, United States
- Key people: Lynn L. Bollinger
- Subsidiaries: Helio Aircraft Company (1969–1976)

The General Aircraft Company was an American aircraft design and manufacturing company that was formed in the late 1930s and ceased involvement with aircraft in 1976.

== History ==
The company was established at Lowell, Massachusetts to build an aircraft designed by Doctor Otto C. Koppen, a professor of aeronautics from the Massachusetts Institute of Technology. The aircraft was the G1-80 Skyfarer, a two-seat cabin high-wing braced monoplane. The company was applied for its first patent, an airplane wing, in 1939.

Before the company could produce the aircraft in any numbers the Second World War intervened, and the Skyfarer programme was abandoned after either 17 or 18 examples had been built. After establishing a factory in Astoria, New York, the company became a manufacturer of the Waco CG-4A troop glider and the interests in the Wayfarer were passed to Grand Rapids Industries.

The company announced plans to produce a new regional airliner called the GAC-100 at its plant in El Segundo, California in 1968.

In 1969, the company bought the Helio Aircraft Company which specialised in building STOL aircraft for use by government agencies in Southeast Asia. The company ceased to manufacture aircraft in October 1976 when it sold the production rights and assets of its Helio Aircraft division.

== Aircraft ==
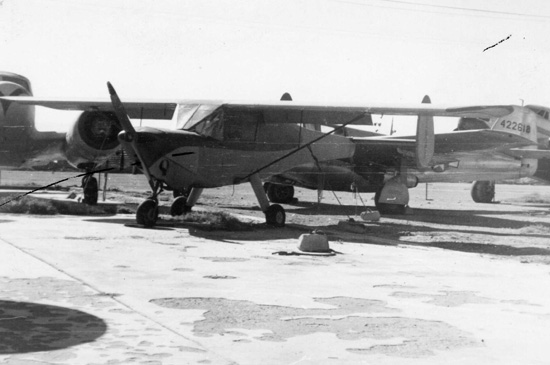
General Skyfarer

| Model name | First flight | Number built | Type |
|---|---|---|---|
| General Skyfarer | | | Single engine cabin monoplane |
| General CG-4A | | 1,112 | Assault glider |
| General GAC-100 | N/A | 0 | Unbuilt four engine regional airliner |
