= Helio Courier =

1949 touring aircraft family by Helio

Courier
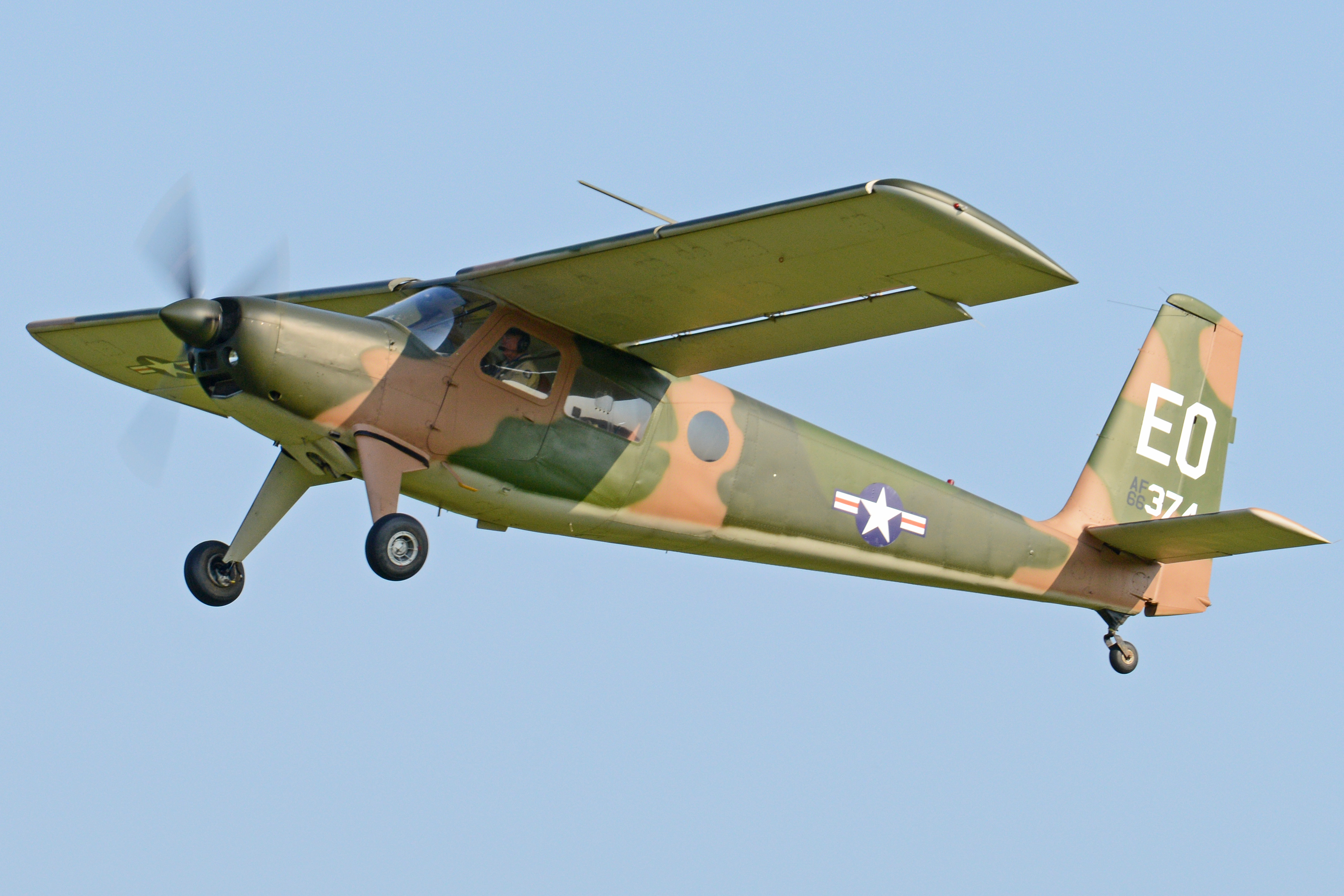
- A restored Helio Courier in flight

General information
- Type: STOL utility aircraft
- Manufacturer: Helio Aircraft Company
- Status: In use as of 2024
- Number built: 500 (approximate total)

History
- Introduction date: 1954
- First flight: 8 April 1949 (Helioplane #1)
- Variant: Helio AU-24 Stallion

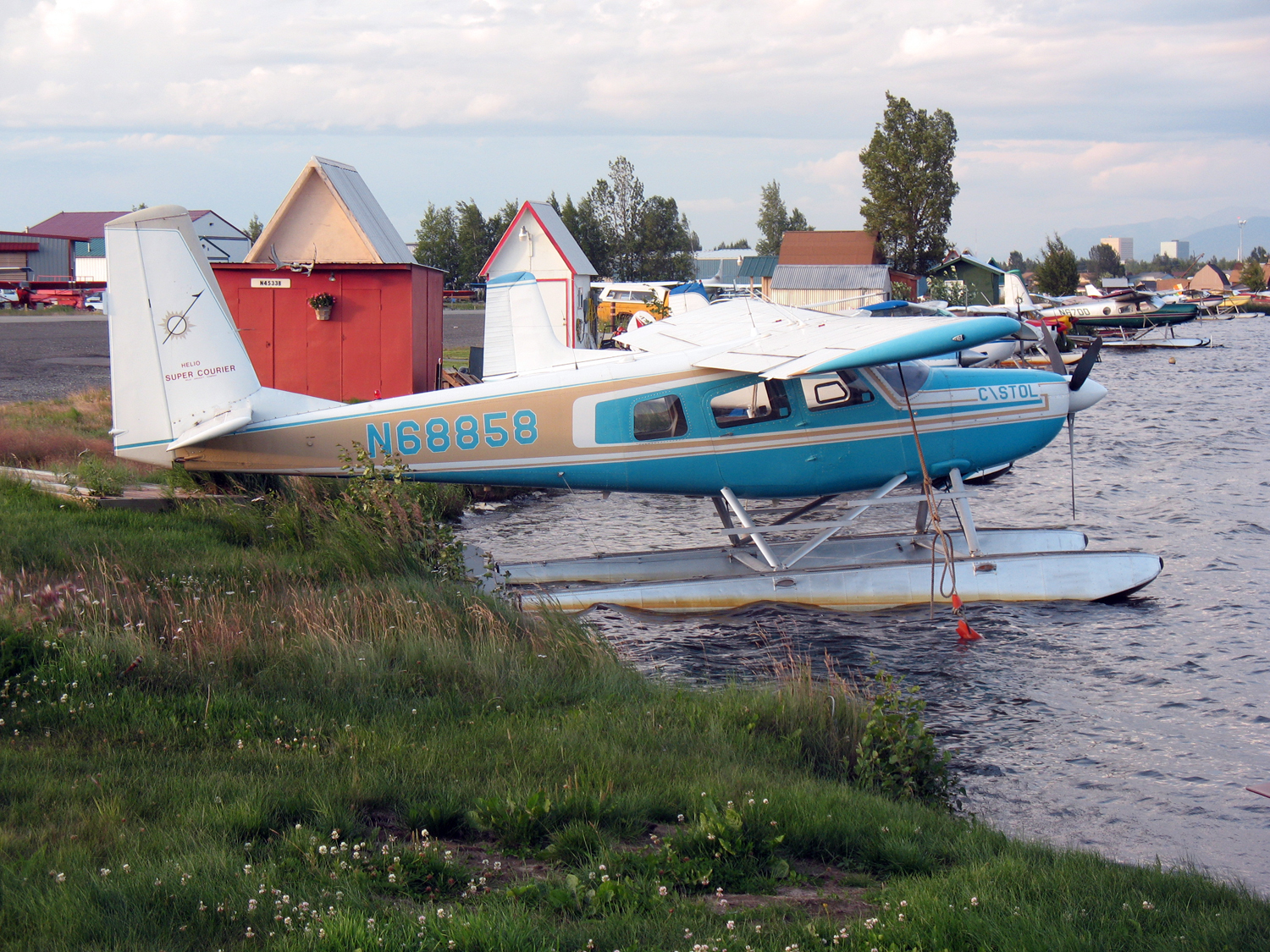
Helio Courier H-295 on floats, Lake Hood Seaplane Base, Anchorage, AK

The Helio Courier is a cantilever high-wing light STOL utility aircraft designed in 1949.

Around 500 of these aircraft were manufactured in Pittsburg, Kansas, from 1954 until 1974 by the Helio Aircraft Company. The design featured four leading-edge slats that deployed automatically, and large trailing-edge flaps. The engine was the 295 hp Lycoming GO-480, which had a gearbox that lowered the output RPM and allowed for the use of a large three-bladed propeller to further improve takeoff performance. Couriers were famous for their takeoffs, which often took only a few plane lengths and then climbed at very high angles. During airshow demonstrations, it was common for the aircraft to actually take off across a 100-to-200-foot-wide (30 to 61 m) runway.

During the early 1980s, new owners (Helio Aircraft Ltd.) made an attempt to build new aircraft with direct-drive Lycoming engines, to replace troublesome and expensive geared engines. In a further effort to reduce weight, a new composite landing gear was featured. The new models also featured modest winglets. Two models were produced, the H-800 and H-700. A total of 18 aircraft were built, before production ceased in 1985. The rights to the Helio Stallion and Helio Courier were acquired by Helio Aircraft of Prescott, Arizona.

In 2019, Helio Alaska was formed and based in Chugiak, Alaska. The company acquired the intellectual property and the FAA certificate 1A8 for the Courier, as well as access to surviving jigs and tooling. Advancements in manufacturing from handmade to numerically controlled machining identified a range of variability within the model's construction. New tooling was created, and the State of Alaska has supported the endeavor.

== Design and development ==
Professor Otto C. Koppen designed aircraft for the Stout Metal Airplane Division of the Ford Motor Company, including the Ford Flivver, an aircraft that was supposed to be mass-produced by Ford. Koppen went on to design the Helio Courier.

The demonstrator for the Courier's concept, "Helioplane #1", was converted by the then-local Wiggins Airways firm from a Piper PA-17 Vagabond Trainer, one of the so-named "short-wing Pipers" in production following World War II. Only the cabin area of the PA-17's original airframe remained unmodified, with the fuselage lengthened by four feet (1.2 meters), given a taller fin-rudder unit, clipped the Vagabond's stock 29 ft-3 inch (8.92 meter) wingspan down to only some 28.5 feet (8.7 meters), fitted the shortened wings with full-span leading-edge slats, long-span wing flaps that forced the ailerons to be much diminished in their span – only occupying the two outermost rib bays inboard of the wingtip; and a longer-travel main landing gear of a taller design, not unlike that of the 1930s-origin Fieseler Fi 156 Storch German military short take-off and landing (STOL) pioneer aircraft. The powerplant for the demonstrator was switched to the Continental C85 boxer-four cylinder air-cooled engine, upgraded with fuel-injection, and uniquely equipped with a multi-belt speed reduction unit to drive its Aeroproducts nine-foot (2.75 meter) diameter, variable-pitch two-blade propeller, which contributed greatly to the amazing STOL flight characteristics of the demonstrator aircraft. The demonstrator's first flight took place on April 8, 1949, flying from what was then called the Boston Metropolitan Airport.

For the construction of the production Courier aircraft, its all aluminum-clad airframe features a welded 15G steel-tube center section fuselage, with shoulder harnesses that protect the occupants in an emergency. The wings are of conventional aluminum construction, but feature Handley Page leading-edge slats that deploy automatically when the aircraft's airspeed falls below a certain value — 55 to 60 miles per hour (89 to 97 km/h). The slats contribute to the Helio's outstanding short takeoff and landing capability, and allow for stall/spin-proof controllable flight. In conjunction with the leading-edge slats, 74% of the trailing edge incorporates high-lift slotted flaps, which together with interrupter blades atop each wing when roll control is lost at very low airspeed, allows for a tight turning radius. The Helio Courier could maintain control at speeds as low as 27 miles per hour (43 km/h, 23 kt).

The design of the Helio features a large vertical tail surface and rudder for control at very low flight speeds. However, on conventional geared aircraft (taildraggers), the airplane tends to be sensitive to crosswinds, thus a crosswind gear option is available, allowing the main tires to caster left or right 20 degrees, increasing the crosswind component to 25mph (40 km/h, 22 kt). The Helio has its main gear placement far forward of the cabin, enabling hard braking on unprepared landing areas. A tricycle-gear model was produced, but is unsuitable for unprepared rough terrain.

Helios are also capable of being equipped with floats; both straight and amphibious floats being offered.

== Operational history ==
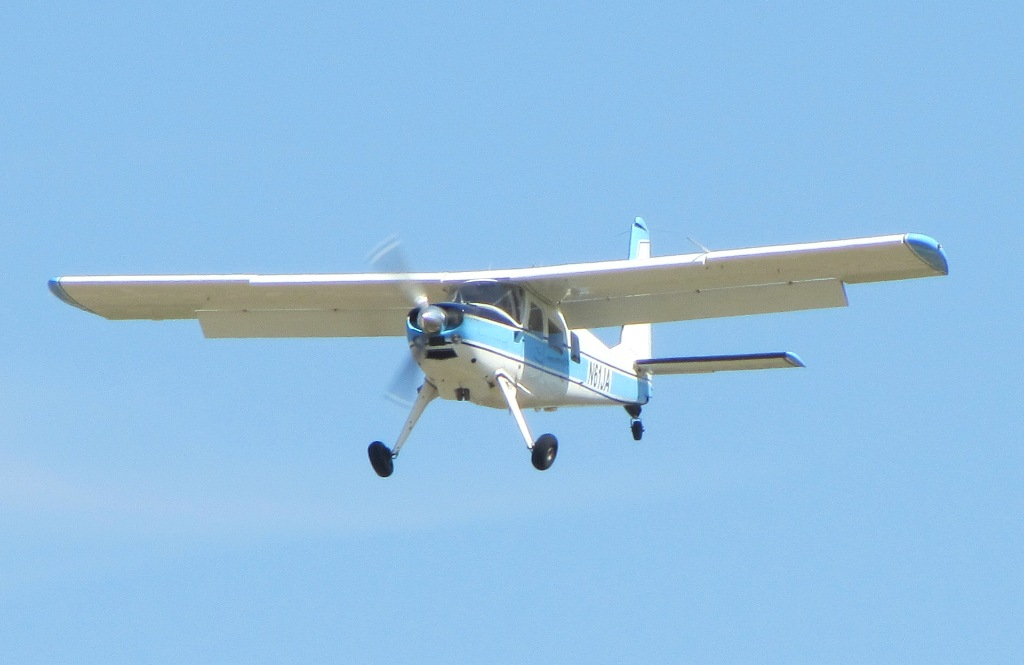
Helio Courier slow flight

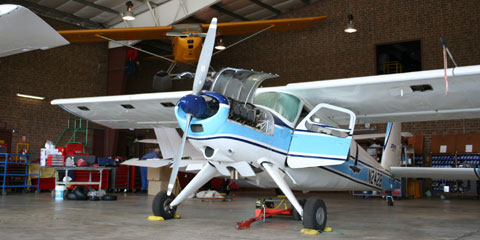
Helio Courier in hangar at JAARS

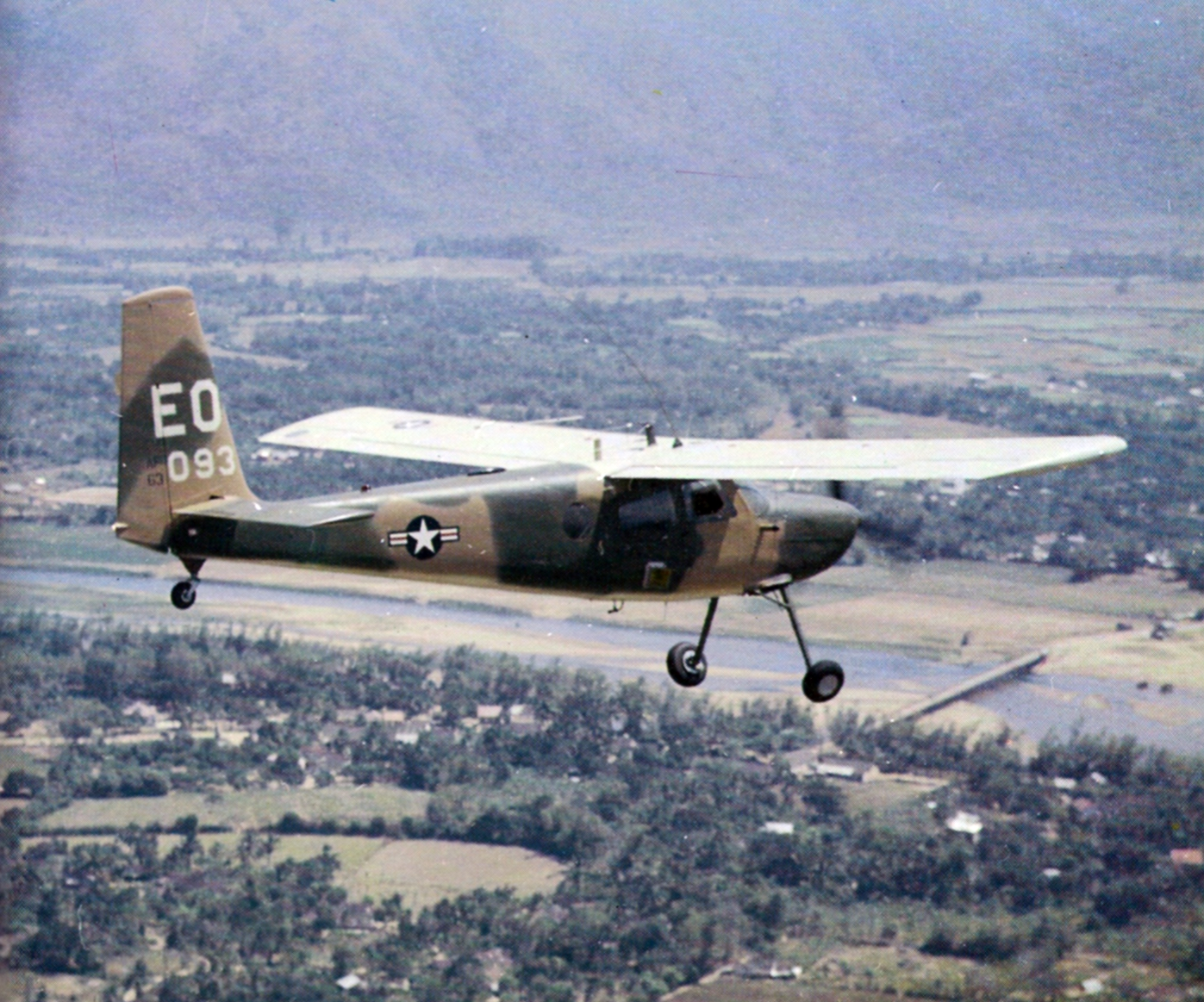
A USAF U-10B from the 5th Special Operations Squadron in Vietnam, 1969.

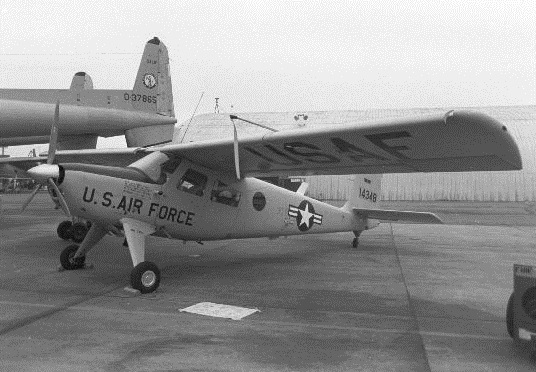
A U-10D with a C-119

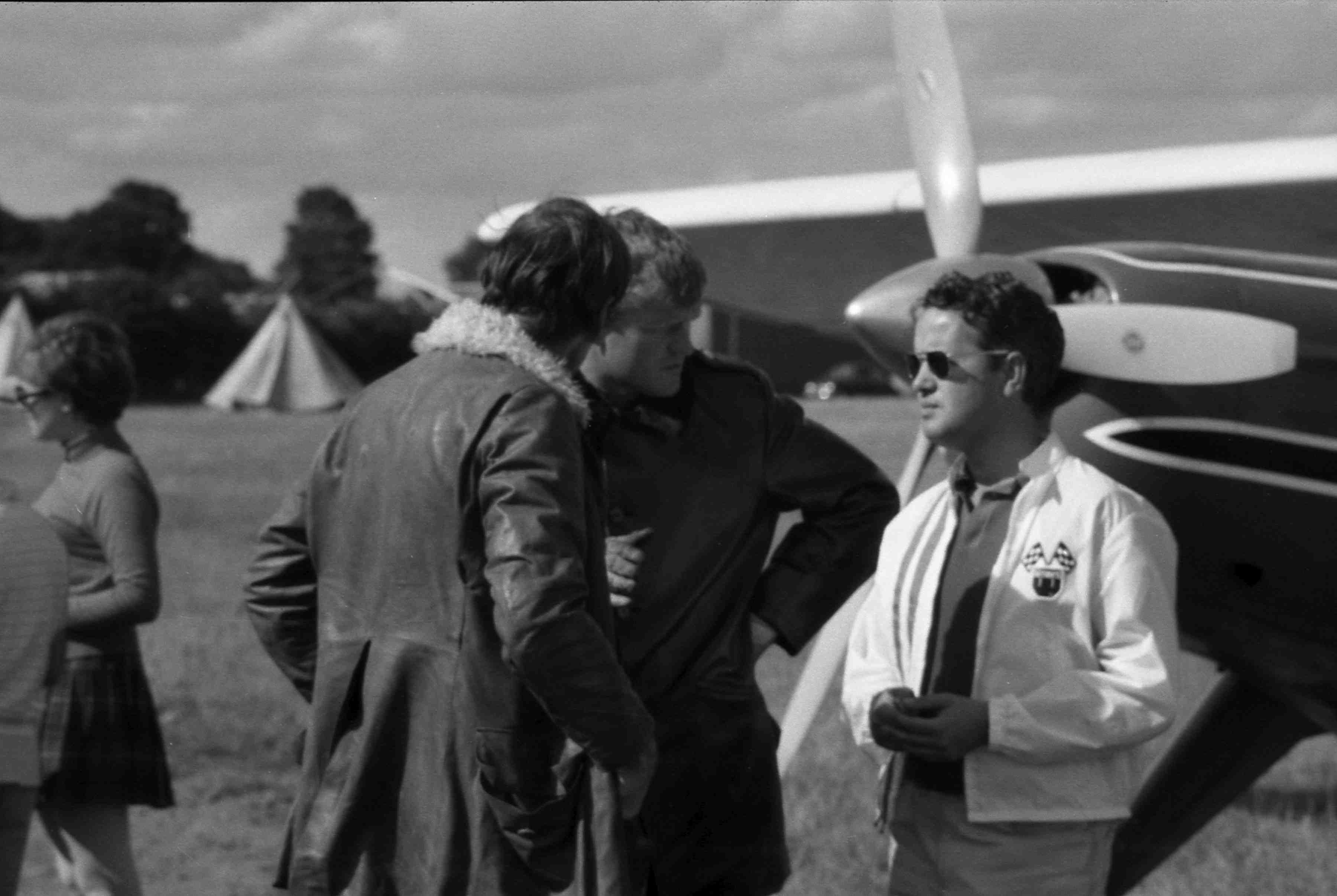
Richard Bach, author of Jonathan Livingston Seagull, and Lynn Garrison with Helio Courier G-ARMU used for Von Richthofen and Brown, 1970

With a minimum-control speed of around 28 mph (45 km/h, 24 kt), the Courier is perfectly suited for confined off-airport operations. The first one was certified in July 1954 and powered by the 260 hp Lycoming GO-435-C2B2. The first production Courier (Serial Number 001, dubbed "Ol' Number 1")C-G001 was previously owned and operated by JAARS as N242B until 2010. Jaars Helio Courier has been a frequent airshow performer at EAA AirVenture Oshkosh for decades, displaying its slow flight capability in front of thousands and serving as a drop plane for the Liberty Parachute Team.

In 1957, a "Strato Courier" set an altitude record over Mexico City, Mexico at 31,200 ft powered by a geared Lycoming GSO-480-A1A5 (340 hp), only one was built. The Super Courier, a more powerful derivative, was used by the U.S. Air Force from 1958 onward, by the U.S. Army Special Forces in the 1960s and 1970s and by Air America during the Vietnam War as the U-10. In U.S. Army and Air Force service, the U-10 Super Courier was used for liaison work, light cargo and supply drops, psychological warfare, forward air control (Air Force), insertion and extraction by land and sea (Army), and reconnaissance. Various versions were produced up through the 1980s, including turbine-powered variants.

The Super Courier saw military service in the United States as the U-10 (ex L-28). Over 120 were built: The L-28A (2, later redesignated U-10A), U-10A (26), U-10B extended range and paratrooper doors (57), and the U-10D with a higher gross weight(36). There was no U-10C.

Helios remain very popular among bush pilots in Canada (32 current) and Alaska and missionaries who fly into rough, relatively unprepared jungle airstrips because of its superior STOL abilities. Some operators use the Helio Couriers for aerial observation. Both Winged Vision Inc. of Gaithersburg, Maryland and the Pima County, Arizona, Sheriff's Department each operate two of the rare tri-gear model and mount gyro-stabilized cameras under the wing for aerial observation. Pima County mounts a FLIR camera for law enforcement, and Winged Vision mounts a high definition television camera for coverage of major sports events.

== Variants ==
Koppen-Bollinger Helioplane
Original prototype soon re-named Helio Courier.
Helioplane Four
unknown possible variant.
Helioplane Two
unknown possible variant.
Hi-Vision Courier
unknown possible variant.
H-291
Prototype, one built.
H-295 Super Courier
Variant with a Lycoming GO-480-G1D6, purchased by USAF as U-10D, 173 built.
HT-295 Super Courier or Trigear Courier
H-295 with tricycle undercarriage, 19 built.
H-250 Courier
H-295 with lengthened fuselage and Lycoming O-540-A1A5 engine, 41 built.
H-391 Courier
Prototype with Lycoming GO-435-C2 engine, one built.
H-391B Courier
Production version of H-391, 102 built.
H-392 Strato Courier
High-altitude version of H-391 with Lycoming GSO-480-A1A5 engine (340 hp).
H-395 Super Courier
H-391B with Lycoming GO-480-G1D6, purchased by USAF as U-10A and U-10B, 138 built.
H-395A Courier
Variant of the H-395 with a Lycoming GO-435-C2B6 engine, seven built.
H-500 Twin Courier
Twin-engined H-395 for the CIA. Very little information available except seven delivered to the CIA under front designation U-5.
H-550 Stallion
Turboprop powered development
H-580 Twin Courier
A longer nosed H-500 with twin wing mounted piston engines, five built.
H-634 Twin Stallion
Planned twin Allison C250 powered Stallion.
H-700 Courier
H-295 with redesigned wing and undercarriage and Lycoming TIO-540-J2B engine.
H-800 Courier
H-700 with Lycoming IO-720-A1B engine, 18 built (H-700 and H-800 together).
L-24 Courier
Military version of the H-391 Courier.
L-28 Courier
Military version of the H-395 Courier.
U-5 Twin Courier
Probable front designation for CIA Twin Couriers.
U-10 Courier
Re-designation of L-28 Courier
Helio AU-24 Stallion
Military designation for H-550 Stallion
B.T.1
(Thai: บ.ธ.๑) Thai designation for the U-10B.

== Operators ==
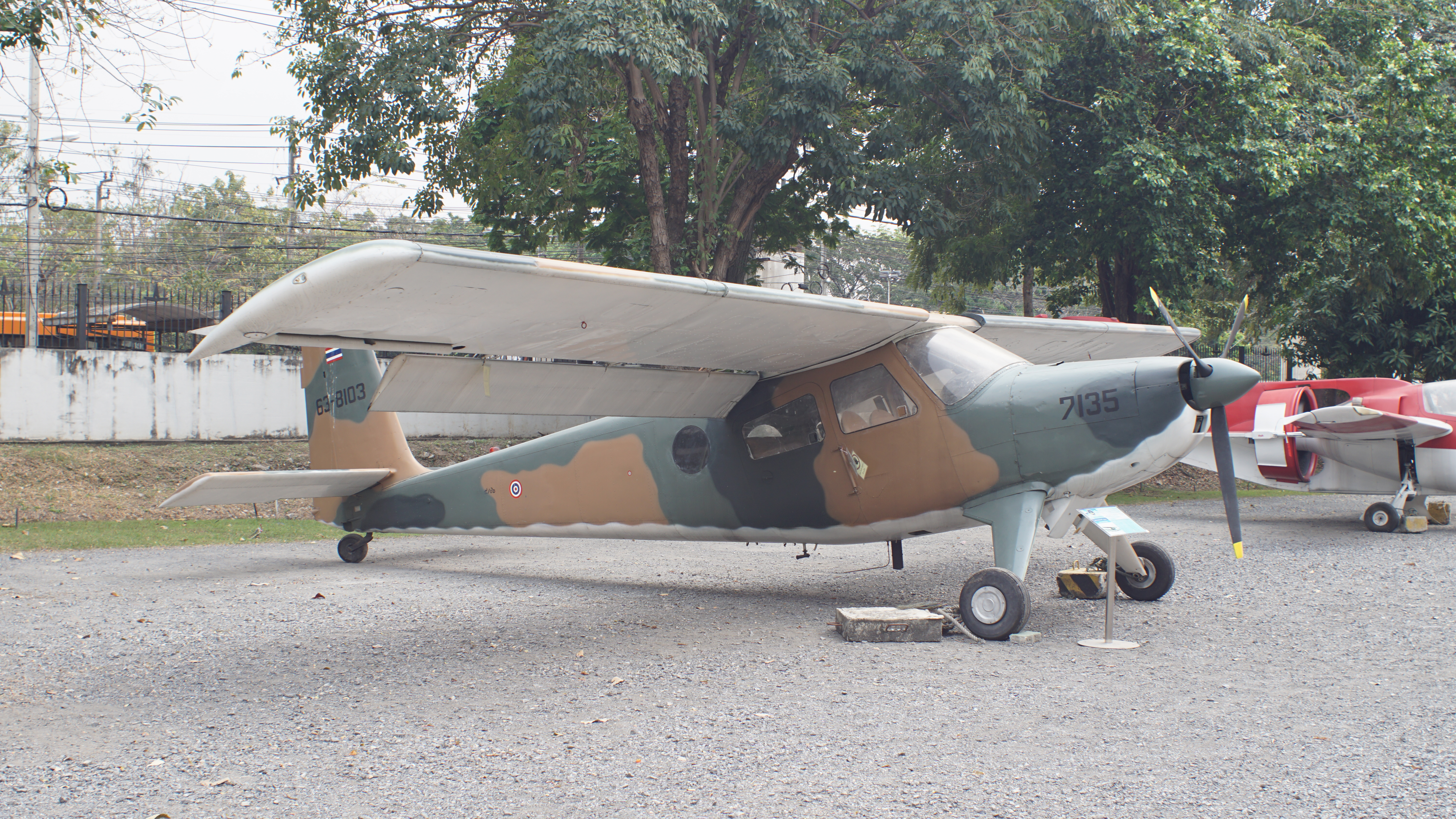
Helio U-10B of The Royal Thai Air Force

=== Military operators ===
Bophuthatswana

- Bophuthatswana Air Force – 2 operated from 1982.

Guyana

- Guyana Defence Force

Italy

- Italian Air Force operated 1 Helio Courier aircraft from 1961 to 1982

Peru
Thailand

- Royal Thai Air Force

Turkey

- Gendarmerie General Command

United States

- Civil Air Patrol
- United States Air Force
  - 4410th Combat Crew Training Squadron
- United States Army

=== Civil operators ===
- Air America
- JAARS
- North-Wright Airways
- Wright Air Service

== Aircraft on display ==
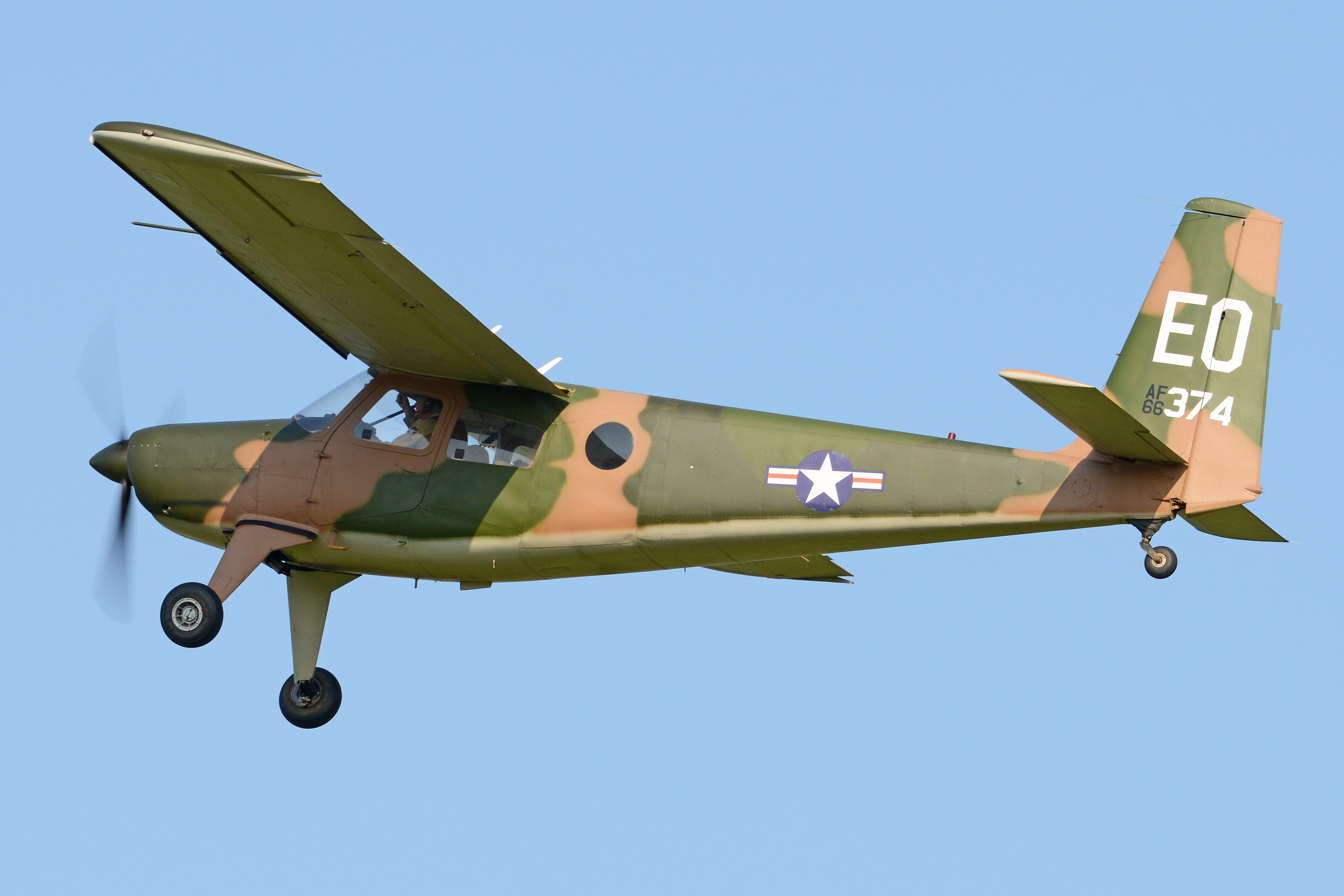
Helio Courier flying in the United Kingdom in 2016.

Thailand

- 7135 – Type 1 on display at the Royal Thai Air Force Museum in Bangkok. It has the USAF serial number 66-14332.

Turkey

- J-1416 at Gendarmerie Museum in Ankara.

United States

- Original "Helioplane No.1" demonstrator aircraft is in storage at the Paul Garber Facility of the National Air and Space Museum in Suitland, Maryland.
- 62-3606 – U-10A on static display at the Memorial Air Park at Hurlburt Field in Mary Esther, Florida.
- 63-13096 – U-10B on static display at the Museum of Aviation at Robins Air Force Base in Warner Robins, Georgia.
- 66-14360 – U-10D on static display at the National Museum of the United States Air Force at Wright-Patterson Air Force Base in Dayton, Ohio.
- 1216 – H-295 on static display at the Alaska Aviation Museum in Anchorage, Alaska. It was formerly owned by Lowell Thomas Jr.

== Specifications (U-10D Super Courier) ==
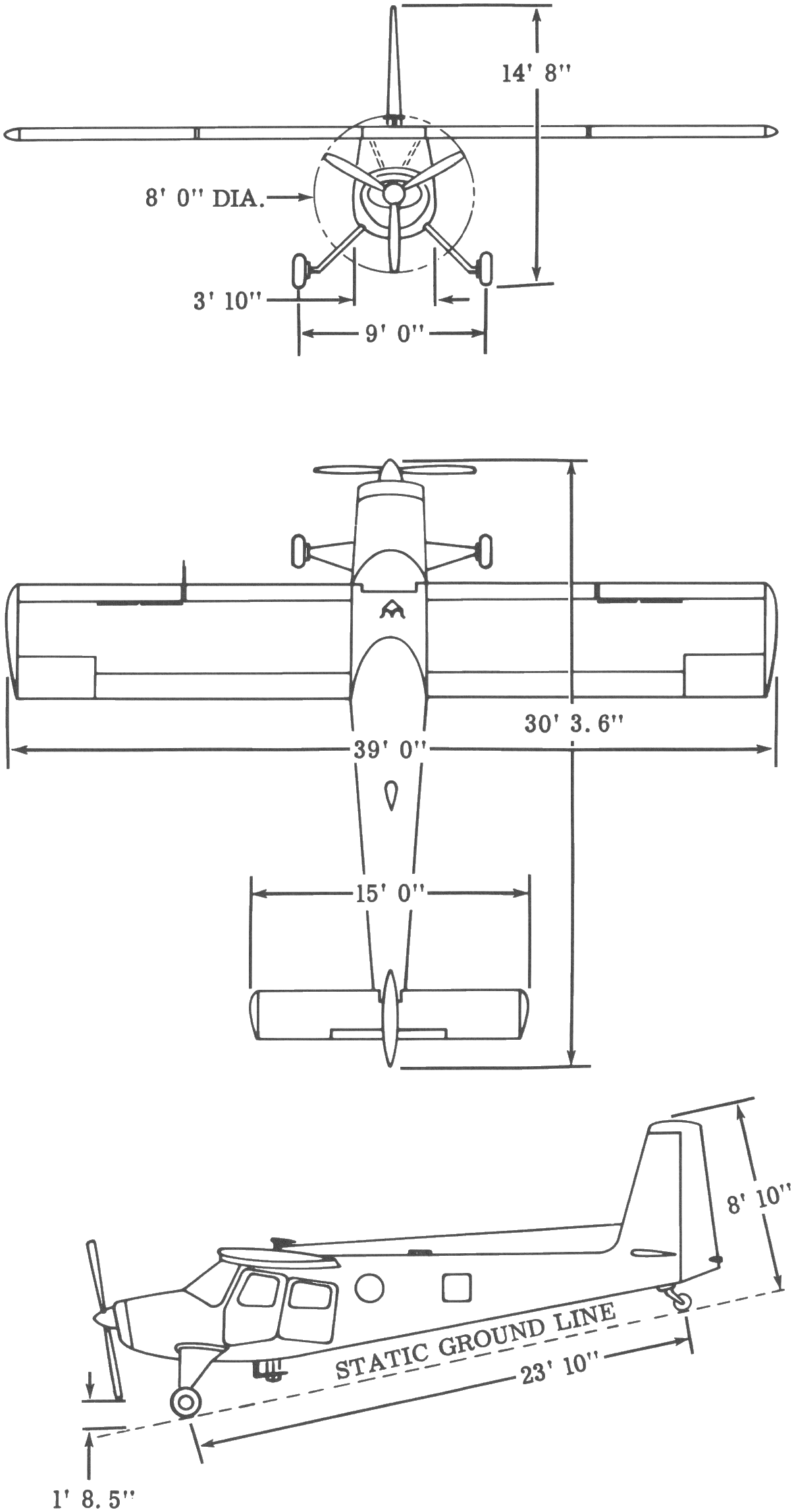
3-view drawing of the Helio U-10A

General characteristics

- Crew: 1
- Capacity: 5 pax / 1,320 lb (599 kg) payload
- Length: 30 ft 8 in (9.35 m)
- Wingspan: 39 ft 0 in (11.89 m)
- Height: 8 ft 10 in (2.69 m)
- Airfoil: NACA 23012
- Empty weight: 2,080 lb (943 kg)
- Gross weight: 3,400 lb (1,542 kg)
- Max takeoff weight: 3,400 lb (1,542 kg)
- Fuel capacity: 120 gal
- Powerplant: 1 × Lycoming GO-480-G1D6 6-cylinder air-cooled horizontally-opposed piston engine, 295 hp (220 kW) at 3400 rpm for take-off

285 hp (213 kW) at 3000 rpm, maximum continuous power

- Propellers: 3-bladed Hartzell HC93Z20-1B/10151-C (or HC-B3Z20-1/10151-C), 8 ft 0 in (2.44 m) diameter constant-speed propeller

Performance

- Maximum speed: 148 kn (170 mph, 274 km/h)
- Cruise speed: 140 kn (160 mph, 260 km/h)
- Never exceed speed: 164 kn (189 mph, 304 km/h)
- Maximum structural cruising speed: 140 kn (161 mph; 259 km/h)
- Maximum maneuvering speed: 85 kn (98 mph; 157 km/h)
- Maximum flaps extended speed: 65 kn (75 mph; 120 km/h)
- Maximum rough air speed: 130 kn (150 mph; 241 km/h) flaps up
- Maximum rough air speed: 80 kn (92 mph; 148 km/h) flaps down
- Range: 950 nmi (1,090 mi, 1,760 km) with 120 US gal (100 imp gal; 450 L) fuel
- Service ceiling: 20,500 ft (6,200 m)
- g limits: +3.8 flaps up, +2 flaps extended
- Rate of climb: 1,200 ft/min (6.1 m/s)

== See also ==
Related development

- Helio AU-24 Stallion
- Helio Rat'ler
- Helio Twin Courier

Aircraft of comparable role, configuration, and era

- De Havilland Canada DHC-2 Beaver
- Cessna 180
- Cessna 185
- Dornier Do 27
- Maule M-5
- Max Holste Broussard
- Murphy Moose
- Scottish Aviation Pioneer
- Pilatus Porter
