= Helio AU-24 Stallion =

1964 American utility aircraft family

AU-24 Stallion
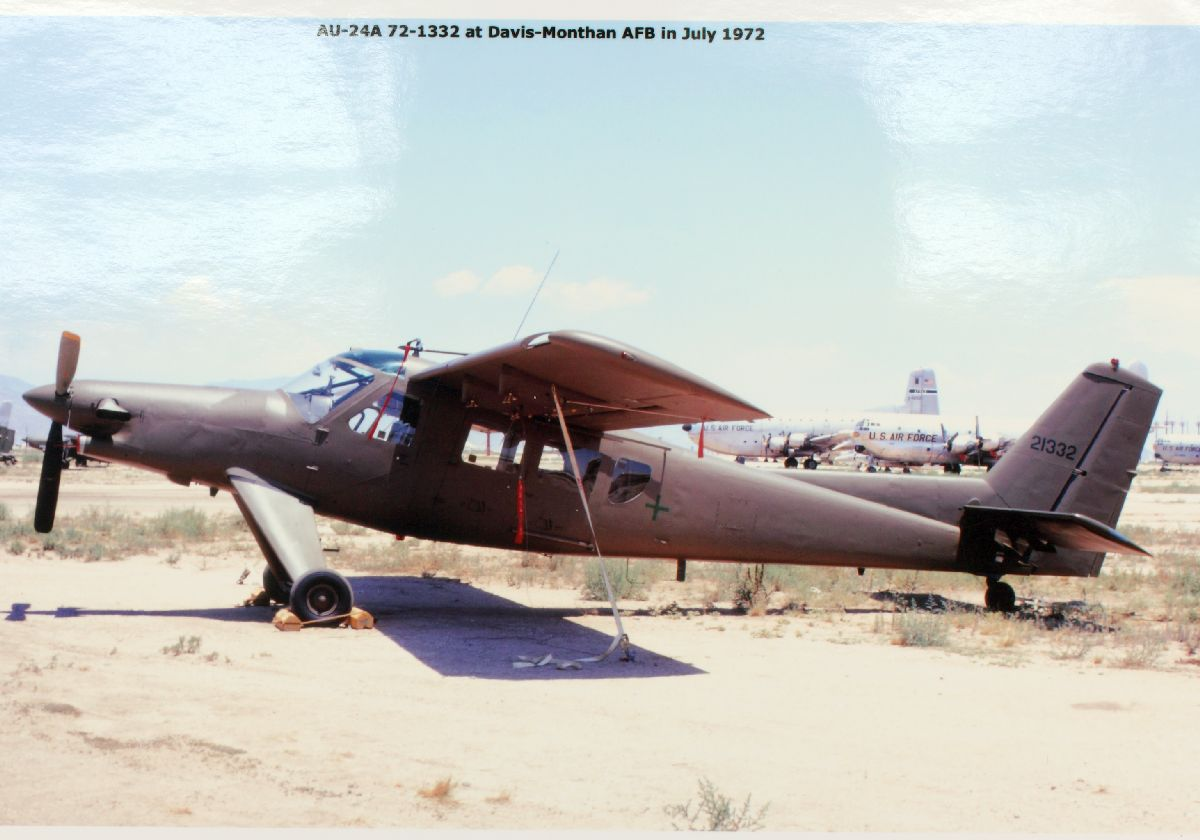
- Helio AU-24A Stallion in storage at Davis-Monthan AFB, July 1972, prior to its delivery to the Khmer Air Force.

General information
- Type: Armed gunship, counter-insurgency, utility transport
- National origin: United States
- Manufacturer: Helio Aircraft Company
- Primary users: United States Air Force Khmer Air Force
- Number built: 20

History
- First flight: 5 June 1964

The Helio AU-24 Stallion was an American armed gunship, counter-insurgency, and utility transport developed for the United States Air Force. A total of 20 were built during the Vietnam War, with most of the aircraft being later sold to the Khmer Air Force.

== Design and development ==
The Helio HST-550 Stallion was an STOL utility aircraft developed in the United States in 1963, with the first prototype making its maiden flight in July 1964. Initially conceived by the Helio Aircraft Company as a turboprop-powered variant of the Helio Courier, it eventually emerged as a completely new design of the same general configuration and much of its design was initiated from components used in the Helio H-500 Twin. It was a much larger aircraft than the Courier, and Helio soon discovered that it was too expensive for the market.

The United States Air Force (USAF) however, emerged as a buyer for the design, purchasing the aircraft for the Credible Chase programme as the AU-24A. This was the gunship version of the Stallion, with a PT6A-27 680 shp (510 kW) turboprop, equipped with an M197 three-barrel 20x102mm rotary cannon mounted in the left cargo door. It also had five underwing and fuselage hardpoints.

Of the 18 aircraft purchased by the USAF, fourteen or fifteen were eventually delivered to the Khmer Air Force (KAF) between January and November 1972 under the Foreign Military Sales program for use in border surveillance and counter-infiltration roles, where the threat of encountering anti-aircraft fire (other than small arms) was minimal.

== Operational history ==
=== Cambodia ===
An important addition to the KAF, the AU-24A mini-gunships were assigned to a newly raised Mini-gunship Squadron (French: Escadron AU-24) stationed at Pochentong Air Base near Phnom Penh, which broadened supply convoy escort operations on the lower Mekong-Bassac Rivers corridors. Such operations had been carried out in conjunction with the Khmer National Navy (MNK) since mid-1971, when the KAF began to provide air cover to MNK convoys with their Douglas AC-47D Spooky gunships.

Under Project Flycatcher, an improvement programme for the KAF, the Americans delivered among other aircraft types a single AU-24A mini-gunship before the programme was officially terminated on June 30, 1973. Although the AU-24A mini-gunships delivered to Cambodia acquainted themselves well in the river convoy escort role, they were found to be beset with a long list of technical faults, which became painfully clear on August 10, 1973, after a Stallion crashed on a rocket pass, killing its crew and forced the KAF Air Command to temporarily ground the entire mini-gunship fleet.

In the final months of the Cambodian Civil War, the KAF employed their AU-24A mini-gunships in night bombing operations against entrenched Khmer Rouge 107mm rocket positions north of Phnom Penh, but after virtually expended their entire ordnance reserves, three Stallions escaped on April 16–17, 1975 from Pochentong Air Base flown by their respective crews to safe haven in neighbouring Thailand, although only two did reach their destination since one crashed at sea in the Gulf of Thailand after running out of fuel.

The Khmer Rouge did manage though to salvage intact nine AU-24A mini-gunships for the Air Force of the Kampuchea Revolutionary Army (AFKRA) of the new Democratic Kampuchea Regime, although poor maintenance and a chronic shortage of spare parts ensured that only one of these machines was still airworthy when the AFKRA was neutralized by the People's Army of Vietnam (PAVN) in February 1979 during the Cambodian–Vietnamese War. This remaining Stallion was subsequently taken after 1979 into service of the air force component of the Kampuchean People's Revolutionary Armed Forces (KPRAF; later, CPAF), remaining operational until 1993, when was finally decommissioned.

== Variants ==
- H-550 – prototypes (2 built)
- AU-24A Stallion (H-550A) – production version (18 built)
- H-634 Twin Stallion – version with twin Allison 250 turboprops mounted on a beam across the nose of the aircraft (not built)
- H-1201T Twin Stallion – version with twin engines in underwing nacelles, retractable undercarriage, tiptanks, and underwing cargo pods (not built)

== Operators ==
Colombia

- Colombian Air Force. A single aircraft seized for drugs and used as liaison.

Cambodia

- Khmer Air Force

United States

- United States Air Force

== Specifications (H-550A) ==
Data from Jane's All The World's Aircraft 1976–77

General characteristics

- Crew: 1
- Capacity: nine passengers
- Length: 39 ft 7 in (12.07 m)
- Wingspan: 41 ft 0 in (12.50 m)
- Height: 9 ft 3 in (2.82 m)
- Wing area: 242 sq ft (22.5 m^{2})
- Aspect ratio: 6.93:1
- Airfoil: NACA 23012
- Empty weight: 2,860 lb (1,297 kg)
- Max takeoff weight: 5,100 lb (2,313 kg)
- Fuel capacity: 120 US gal (100 imp gal; 450 L)
- Powerplant: 1 × Pratt & Whitney Canada PT6A-27 turboprop, 680 shp (510 kW) (effective shp)

Performance

- Maximum speed: 216 mph (348 km/h, 188 kn) at 10,000 ft (3,000 m)
- Cruise speed: 160 mph (260 km/h, 140 kn) at 10,000 ft (3,000 m) (econ. cruise)
- Never exceed speed: 218 mph (351 km/h, 189 kn) (Calibrated airspeed)
- Range: 641 mi (1,032 km, 557 nmi)
- Service ceiling: 25,000 ft (7,600 m)
- Rate of climb: 2,200 ft/min (11 m/s)
- Takeoff run to 50 ft (15 m): 660 ft (200 m)
- Landing run from 50 ft (15 m): 750 ft (230 m)

== See also ==
Aircraft of comparable role, configuration, and era

- Beechcraft QU-22 Pave Eagle
- Fairchild AU-23 Peacemaker
