= Ford Flivver =

American single-seat aircraft

Model 2A Flivver
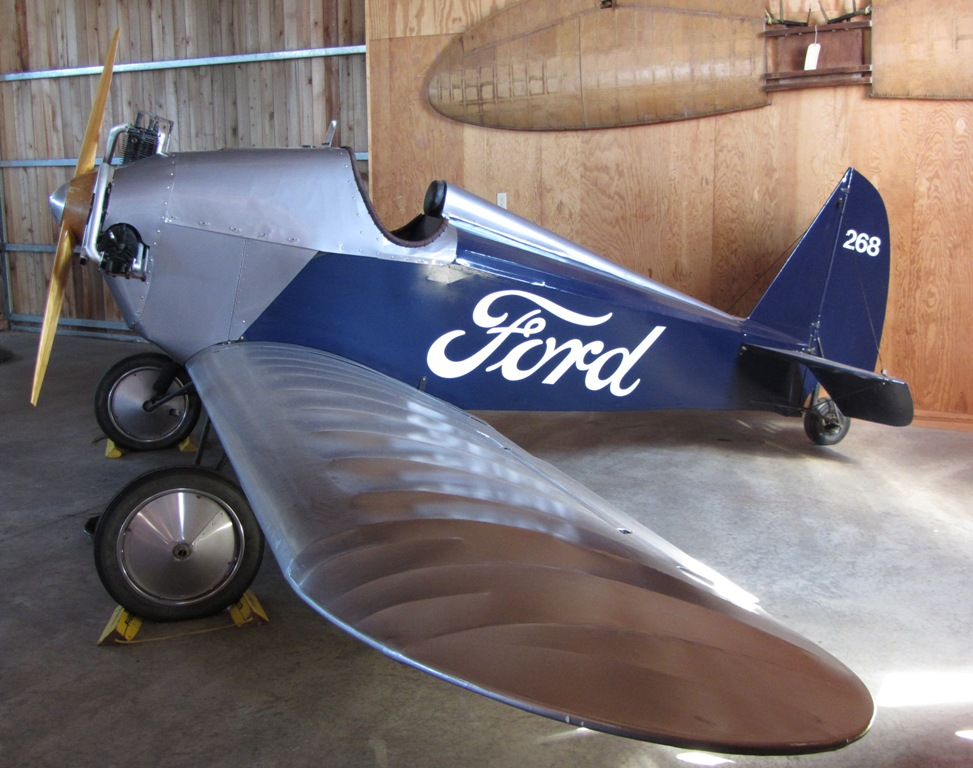
- Ford Flivver replica

General information
- Type: Light aircraft
- National origin: United States
- Manufacturer: Stout Metal Airplane Division of the Ford Motor Company
- Designer: Otto C. Koppen
- Number built: 5

History
- Introduction date: 1927

The Ford Flivver is a single-seat aircraft introduced by Henry Ford as the "Model T of the Air". (Note: Henry Ford also called the Ford Flivver a "Sky Flivver", again building on the connection to the ground-breaking Model T, which was commonly called a "flivver.") After a fatal crash of a prototype into the ocean off Melbourne, Florida, production plans were halted.

== Development ==
The Ford Trimotor was Henry Ford's first successful commercial aircraft venture in 1925. Following the Ford Model T as an "everyman's" vehicle, the Ford Flivver was designed to be a mass-produced "everyman's" aircraft. The idea was first proposed to William Bushnell Stout, manager of Ford's acquired aircraft division in 1926. Both Stout and William Benson Mayo, head of Ford's Aircraft Division wanted nothing to do with the aircraft and it was built in a nearby museum building in the Ford Laboratories.

Ford Flivver c. 1927. Note: Full-span ailerons.

The single-seat aircraft was designed with Mr. Ford's instructions that it "fit in his office". The first example was displayed at the 1926 Ford National Reliability Air Tour. The press and public flocked to see "Ford's Flying Car," a single-seat aircraft that had very little in common with the popular Model T "Flivver." Comedian Will Rogers posed for press photos in the aircraft (although he never flew one). A New York Evening Sun columnist wrote the following poem showing excitement for the future flying Fords.

I dreamed I was an angel
And with the angels soared
But I was simply touring
The heavens in a Ford.

The name of the aircraft, "flivver", originated from a slang word in the early twentieth century designating an inexpensive car.

== Design ==
The aircraft was a welded steel tube fuselage, with wood wing construction with fabric covering. The steerable rudder mounted tailwheel was also the only wheel with a brake. The exhaust was routed through a special manifold to a stock Model T exhaust. The steel landing gear was fastened to the wing and used rubber doughnuts in compression for shock absorption. The designer of the aircraft, Otto Koppen, went on to design the Helio Courier.

== Operational history ==
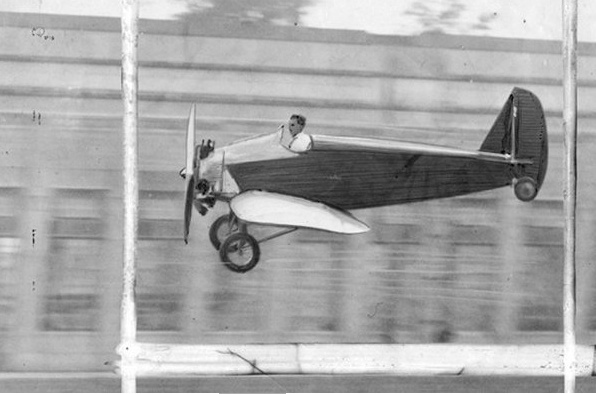
Harry Brooks piloting the first Ford Flivver, c. 1927

Ford unveiled the Flivver on his 63rd birthday, July 30, 1926. Ford's chief test pilot was Harry J. Brooks, a young employee who had become a favorite of Ford. Brooks flew the Flivver regularly from his home garage to work at the Ford Laboratory, and later, used the second Flivver to move about the Ford properties. He once flew the aircraft in a race against Gar Wood in Miss America V on the Detroit River during the Harmsworth Trophy Races.

In an attempt to draw on his popularity, Charles Lindbergh was invited to fly the Flivver on a visit to Ford field, August 11, 1927, and was the only other pilot to fly the Flivver prototypes. He later described the Flivver as "one of the worst aircraft he ever flew". (Note: Throughout the brief flight trials and "real world" assessments, the main deficiency of being underpowered remained unresolved.)

A third prototype, tail number 3218, with "long" wings was built to win a long distance record for light planes in 440 to 880 lb (200 to 400 kg) "C" class. (Note: The Ford Flivver would compete in the FAI C-1a/0 class (piston-engined aircraft of less than 300 kg).) The race was set from Ford Field in Dearborn Michigan to Miami, Florida. A first attempt launched on 24 January 1928, witnessed by Henry Ford, landed short in Asheville, North Carolina. A second attempt, flying the second prototype, witnessed by Edsel Ford, Brooks launched from Detroit on February 21, 1928 but landed 200 mi (320 km) short in Titusville, Florida, where the propeller was bent, but still achieved a 972 mi (1,564 km) record.

During his overnight stay at Titusville, Brooks had repaired the aircraft, using the propeller from the aircraft involved in the forced landing. He had also placed wooden toothpicks in the vent holes on his fuel cap to prevent moist air from entering and condensing overnight. On February 25, Brooks took off to complete the flight, circled out over the Atlantic where his motor quit and he went down off Melbourne, Florida. The wreckage of the Ford Flivver washed up, but the pilot was never found. Investigation of the wreckage disclosed that the toothpicks had plugged the fuel cap vent holes, causing an engine stoppage.

Following the death of Brooks, Henry Ford was distraught at the loss of his friend, and light aircraft development was stopped under the Ford brand. In 1931, a new "Air Flivver" or Sky Car was marketed by the Stout division of Ford. Ford went back into light plane development in 1936 with the two-seat Model 15-P. The prototype crashed during flight testing and did not go into production.

== Variants ==
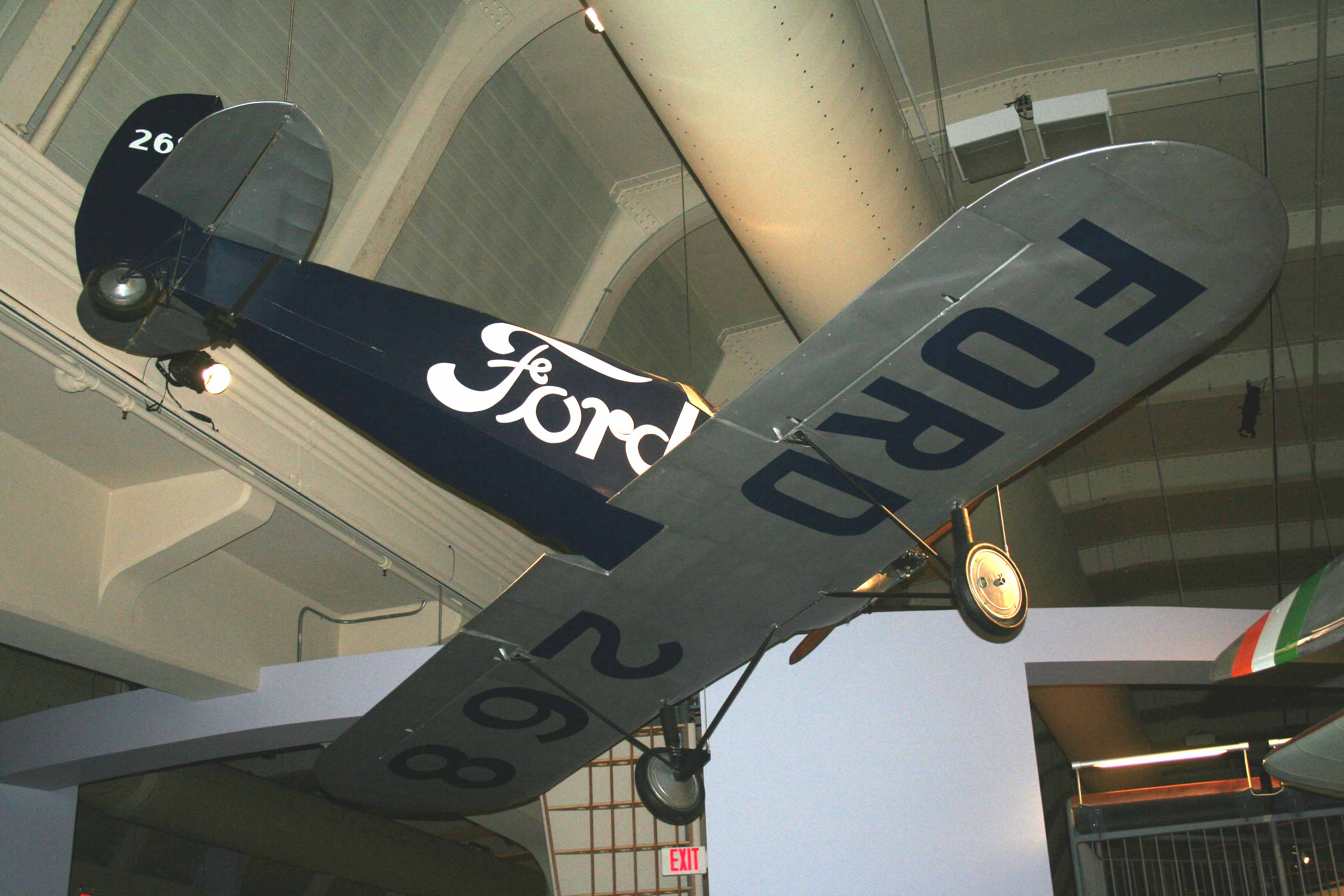
Ford Flivver on display at the Henry Ford Museum

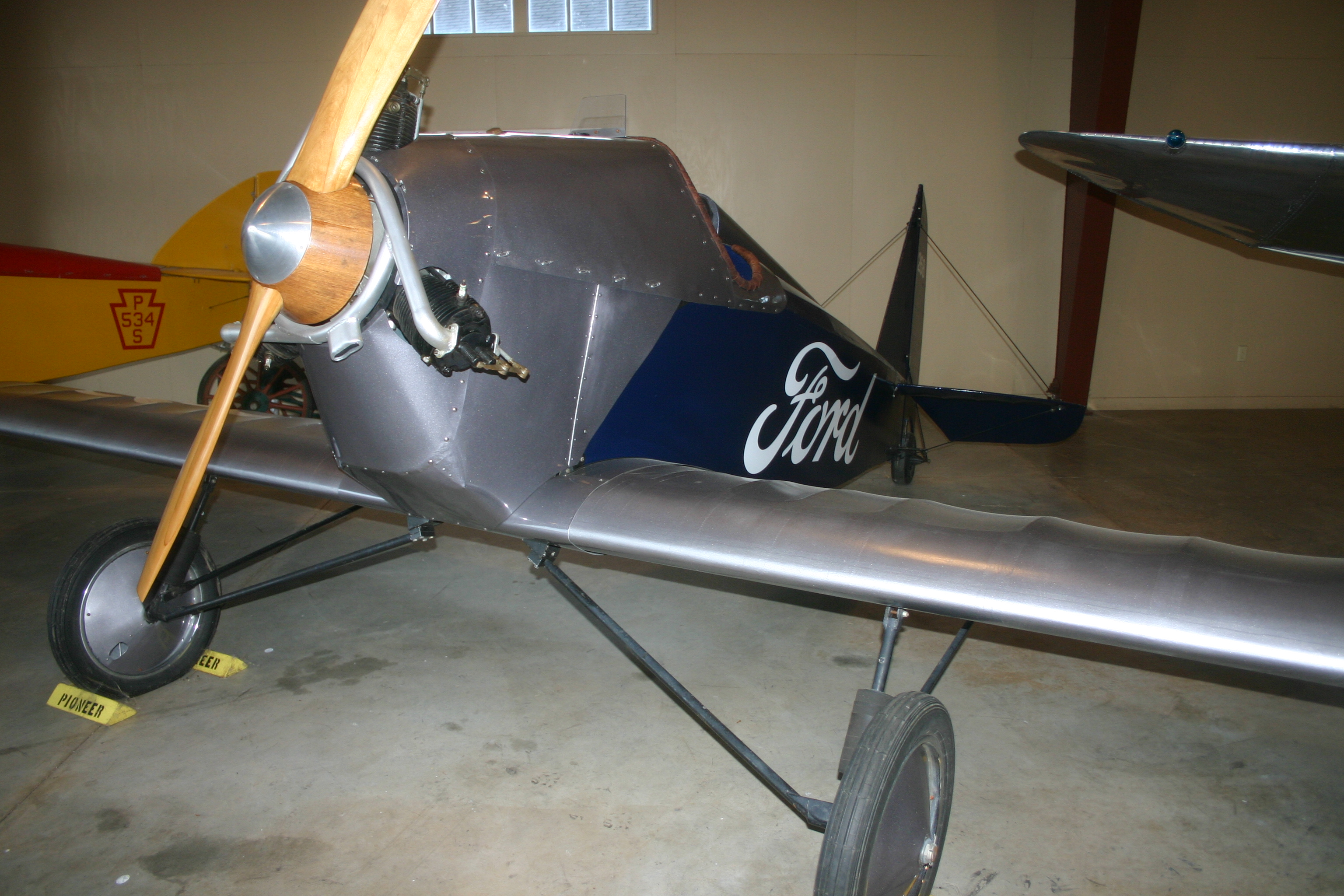
Ford Flivver replica on display at the EAA AirVenture Museum

- Original Flivver 2A prototype: Designed around a 15-foot (4.6-metre) wingspan, also built with full-span ailerons that could act as flaps, as well as shortened versions, powered by a 36-horsepower (27 kW) three-cylinder Anzani; two built.
- Flivver 2A (Flivver 3218) The third prototype was larger with a 22-foot (6.7-metre) wingspan, had a fabric-covered steel frame, featured wing struts, a 50-US-gallon (42 imp gal; 189 L) fuel tank, a dihedral increase, and a custom 143-cubic-inch (2,340 cm^{3}) Ford-designed, horizontally opposed two-cylinder engine using Wright Whirlwind components that produced 40 horsepower (30 kW). The final three prototypes had this engine. Crash investigations were based on the pieces of this aircraft that washed ashore.

== Aircraft on display ==
A surviving Flivver resides in the Henry Ford Museum. In 1991, EAA Chapter 159 from Midland, Michigan donated a replica to the EAA AirVenture Museum. The replica was built in 1989 from careful inspection of the original prototype and advice from Otto C. Koppen, the original designer, although it was powered by a two-cylinder Franklin engine. A second replica is on display at the Florida Air Museum.

== Specifications (Ford Model 2A Flivver) ==
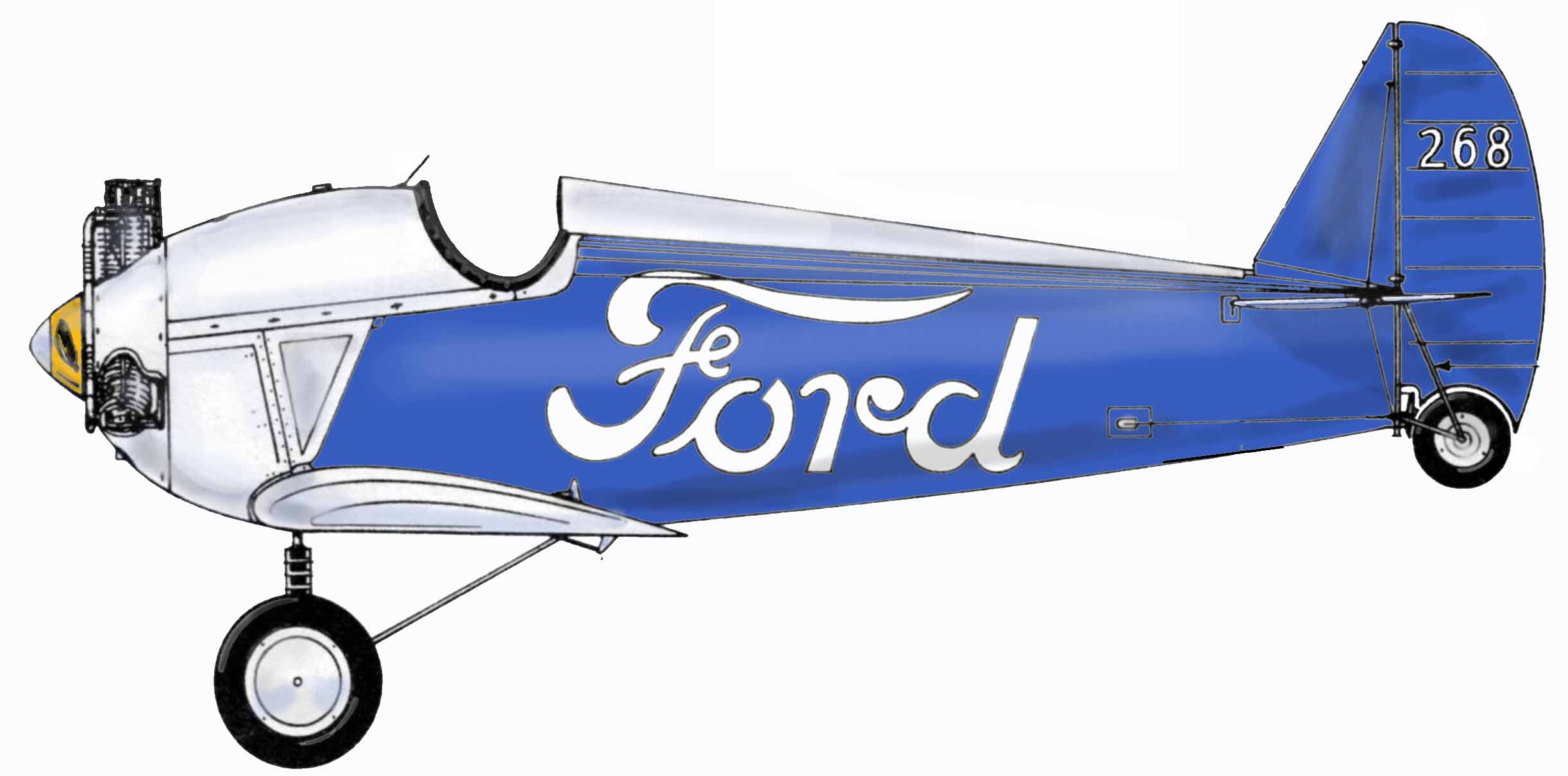
Side profile

Data from Pauley, Sport Aviation

General characteristics

- Crew: 1
- Capacity: 1
- Length: 15 ft 6 in (4.72 m)
- Wingspan: 21 ft 9 in (6.63 m)
- Airfoil: Gottingen 387
- Empty weight: 500 lb (227 kg)
- Powerplant: 1 × Anzani Radial, 36 hp (27 kW)

Performance

- Maximum speed: 78 kn (90 mph, 140 km/h)
- Stall speed: 26 kn (30 mph, 48 km/h)

== See also ==
- Volksflugzeug

Aircraft of comparable role, configuration, and era

- Szekely Flying Dutchman
