= Helio Twin Courier =

Touring aircraft model by Helio

Twin Courier
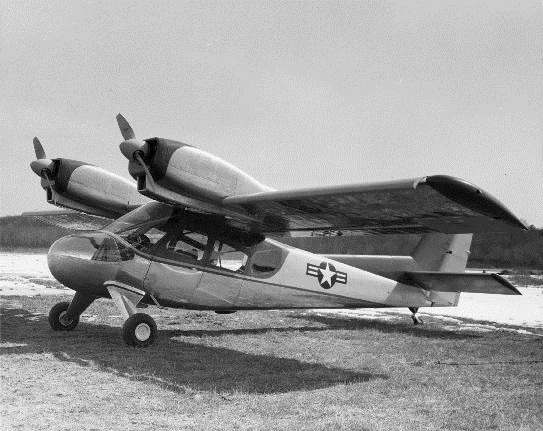
- U-5A Twin Courier

General information
- Type: STOL light transport
- National origin: United States of America
- Manufacturer: Helio Aircraft Company
- Number built: 7

History
- First flight: April 1960
- Developed from: Helio Courier

The Helio Twin Courier is a twin-engined version of the Helio Courier, with very few examples being produced.

== Design and development ==
Known by Helio as the model H-500 this STOL aircraft mounted twin Lycoming engines on top of the high-set wing, close to the fuselage. With the engines mounted in this manner, lateral and over-the-nose visibility were much improved while the propellers were kept clear of cabin doors and away from possible debris damage during rough field operations. This was a tail-wheel design, so the vertical component of propeller thrust assisted STOL take-off performance from rough fields. In 1967 or 68, work was started on a redesign of the Twin Courier in a tricycle-gear configuration for the commercial market, since many firms which desired STOL capability had regulations which required multi-engine aircraft. The company ran out of money and the project was terminated.

The aircraft structure of the Helio Stallion, a single-engine turboprop version of the more successful Helio Courier, was based on the design of the Twin Courier.

The Twin Courier could seat six and first flew in April 1960, being awarded FAA certification on June 11, 1963. (The Twin Courier met FAA requirements marginally and was certificated to meet immediate needs for service in Vietnam, on the understanding that the design would not be marketed commercially. Thus, the redesign mentioned above.) Only seven examples were built, these receiving the United States Armed Forces designation U-5A. One was reported to have been evaluated by US Army Special Forces. Fully automatic full-span, leading-edge slats were fitted along with high-lift flaps.

While the ailerons appear small relative to the overall wing span, the Twin Courier also had roll-control spoilers that would deploy with the ailerons to maintain roll authority at low speeds. Partway through production, Helio added a thin, slotted airfoil spanning the two engine nacelles to improve boundary layer control over the center section of the wing.

== Operators ==
India

- Aviation Research Centre
- Indian Intelligence Bureau

United States

- Air America
- CIA
- United States Air Force

== Specifications (U-5A Twin Courier) ==
Data from Jane's All The World's Aircraft 1965-66

General characteristics

- Crew: 1
- Capacity: 5 passengers
- Length: 32 ft 0 in (9.75 m)
- Wingspan: 41 ft 0 in (12.50 m)
- Height: 8 ft 10 in (2.69 m)
- Wing area: 242 sq ft (22.5 m^{2})
- Empty weight: 3,126 lb (1,418 kg)
- Max takeoff weight: 5,850 lb (2,654 kg)
- Powerplant: 2 × Lycoming O-540-A2B or -C2C air-cooled flat-six, 250 hp (190 kW) each
- Propellers: 2-bladed Hartzell, 7 ft 0 in (2.13 m) diameter

Performance

- Maximum speed: 185 mph (298 km/h, 161 kn) at sea level
- Cruise speed: 166 mph (267 km/h, 144 kn) (econ cruise, 60% power) at 10,000 ft (3,050 m)
- Range: 1,500 mi (2,400 km, 1,300 nmi) (max fuel)
- Service ceiling: 19,500 ft (5,900 m)
- Rate of climb: 1,640 ft/min (8.3 m/s)
