= General Skyfarer =

Skyfarer
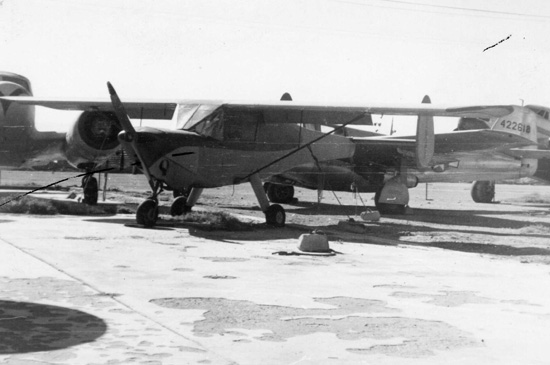

General information
- Type: Two-seat cabin monoplane
- Manufacturer: General Aircraft
- Designer: Otto C. Koppen
- Number built: 18

History
- First flight: 1940s

The General Aircraft G1-80 Skyfarer was a 1940s American two-seat cabin monoplane aircraft built by the General Aircraft Corporation of Lowell, Massachusetts. Designed by Otto C. Koppen, it lacked rudder pedals and was considered spin-proof. The Skyfarer program was abandoned during World War II after about 18 examples had been built.

== Development ==
The General Aircraft Corporation was established to build an aircraft designed by Doctor Otto C. Koppen from the Massachusetts Institute of Technology. The aircraft was the G1-80 Skyfarer, a two-seat cabin high-wing braced monoplane with a light alloy basic structure and a mixed steel tube and fabric covering. It had an unusual tail unit, a cantilever tailplane with the elevator mounted on the upper surface of the tail with aluminum endplate fins and no movable rudders. It was powered by a 75 hp (56 kW) Avco Lycoming GO-145-C2 geared air-cooled four-cylinder engine.

The aircraft incorporated aerodynamic control principles covered by patents issued to Fred Weick, an early aeronautical engineer who went on to design and market the Ercoupe. Since it had no rudders (or rudder pedals), it was simpler to fly (it had a single control wheel, which controlled the ailerons and elevator), and was considered spin-proof. The aircraft was certified in 1941 with a placard that stated that the aircraft was characteristically incapable of spinning. It was claimed that an average person could learn to fly the Skyfarer in about an hour.

It was anticipated that many aircraft would be ordered and built, but the United States became involved in the Second World War and the Skyfarer program was abandoned after either 17 or 18 examples had been built. At one point, a company called Tennessee Aircraft planned on manufacturing the airplane. However, the rights and tooling passed to Grand Rapids Industries, who built two aircraft before stopping production. The company became a manufacturer of the Waco CG-4A troop glider.

== Operational history ==
The prototype was built in 1937 in a stable behind the General Aircraft Company president's house.

In October 1944, a Skyfarer was used by Alverna Babbs, the first legless pilot to be granted a student pilot's permit, to complete her first solo flight at Lunken Airport.

== Variants ==
L.W. DuVon and Dr. David O. Kime of Western Union College convinced the type holder Grand Rapids Industries, to give the equipment, tools and one of the finished planes to the college. They then found local investors who formed Mars Corporation in 1945. The aircraft was later licensed as the Mars M1-80 Skycoupe with a 100 hp engine. One example was built and production plans were estimated to be as high as 75 planes in its first year. The glut of aircraft produced after the war left little market for the aircraft. The facility to manufacture the aircraft was sold by 1946.

The aircraft, NC29030, resides in the Plymouth County Historical Museum in Le Mars, Iowa.

== Specifications (G1-80 Skyfarer) ==
Data from U.S. Civil Aircraft Vol. 8 (ATC 701–ATC800)

General characteristics

- Crew: one pilot
- Capacity: one passenger, seated side-by-side with pilot
- Length: 22 ft 0 in (6.71 m)
- Wingspan: 31 ft 5 in (9.58 m)
- Height: 8 ft 8 in (2.64 m)
- Wing area: 121.3 sq ft (11.27 m^{2})
- Empty weight: 890 lb (404 kg)
- Gross weight: 1,350 lb (612 kg)
- Fuel capacity: 20 US gal (17 imp gal; 76 L)
- Powerplant: 1 × Avco Lycoming GO-145-C2 air-cooled flat-four piston engine, 75 hp (56 kW)

Performance

- Maximum speed: 100 mph (160 km/h, 87 kn)
- Cruise speed: 92 mph (148 km/h, 80 kn) (80% power)
- Stall speed: 44 mph (71 km/h, 38 kn)
- Range: 350 mi (560 km, 300 nmi)
- Service ceiling: 10,000 ft (3,000 m)
- Rate of climb: 600 ft/min (3.0 m/s)

== See also ==
- Chrislea Super Ace
