= Fairchild 21 =

KR-21
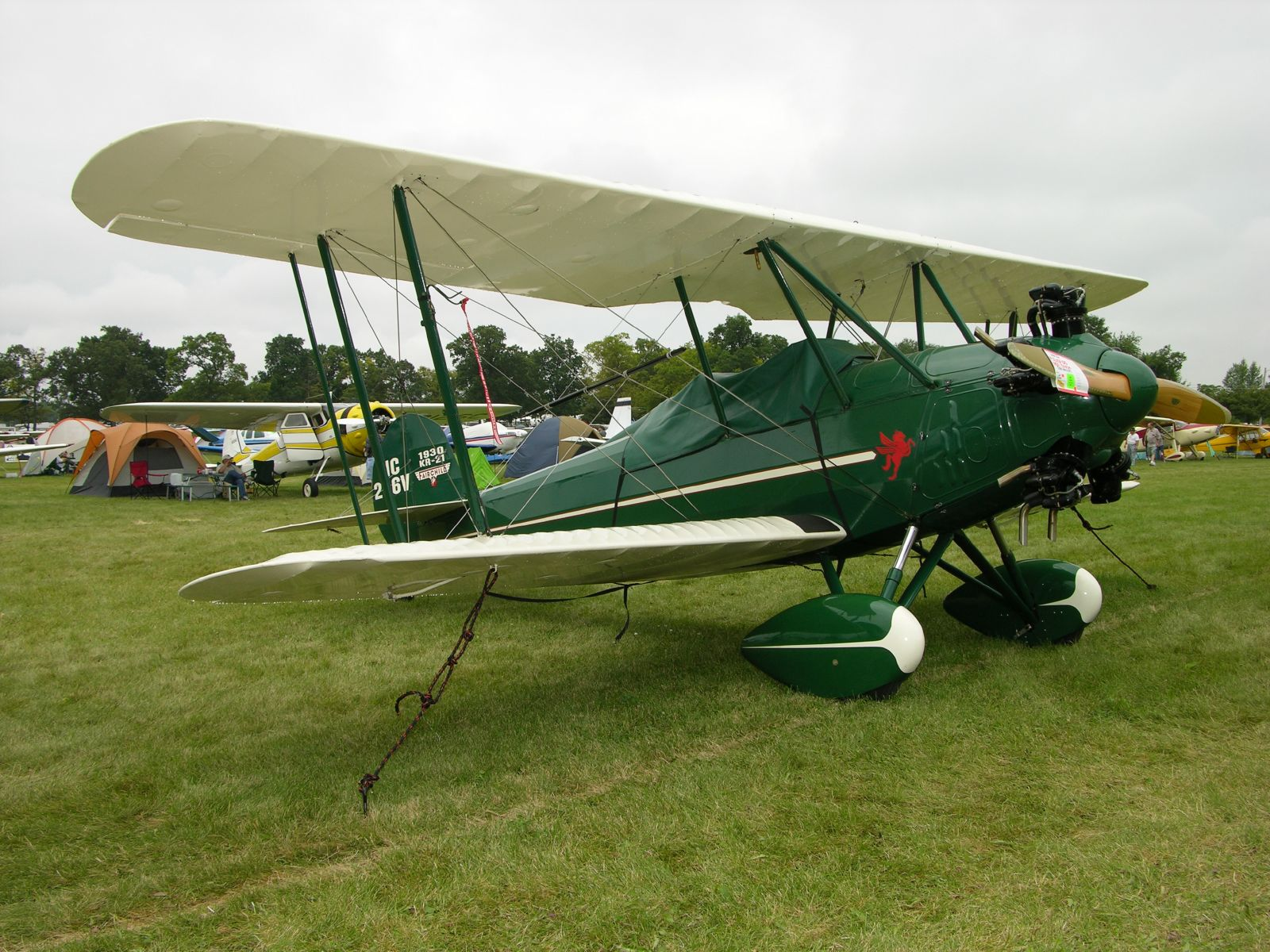
- Fairchild KR-21-B of 1930

General information
- Type: Two-seat biplane
- National origin: United States
- Manufacturer: Fairchild Aircraft
- Designer: Otto C. Koppen

History
- First flight: 1928

The Kreider-Reisner KR-21-A is a 1928 American two-seat biplane. It was designed and built by the Kreider-Reisner Aircraft Company of Hagerstown, Maryland. Fairchild Aircraft took over Kreider-Reisner in 1929 and continued to build them, as the Fairchild KR-21, later the Fairchild 21.

== Design and development ==
Designed by Fred Seiler Jr., H.L. Puckett states "over 200 were built in 6 different models."

The KR-21-A was a wire braced biplane with two open tandem cockpits and powered by a 100 hp (60 kW) Kinner K-5 radial piston engine. It was of mixed construction and had a fixed tailwheel landing gear and was fitted with dual controls.

The KR-21-B was a more powerful biplane development, using a 125 bhp Kinner B-5 engine.

== Specifications (KR-21) ==
Data from

General characteristics

- Crew: 2
- Length: 21 ft 6 in (6.55 m)
- Wingspan: 28 ft 3 in (8.61 m)
- Wing area: 139 sq ft (12.9 m^{2})
- Empty weight: 755 lb (342 kg)
- Max takeoff weight: 1,250 lb (567 kg)
- Powerplant: 1 × Kinner K-5 5-cylinder radial piston engine, 90 hp (67 kW)

Performance

- Maximum speed: 105 mph (169 km/h, 91 kn)
- Cruise speed: 90 mph (140 km/h, 78 kn)
- Range: 425 mi (684 km, 369 nmi)
- Service ceiling: 9,440 ft (2,880 m)
