= Szekely Flying Dutchman =

Model V Flying Dutchman
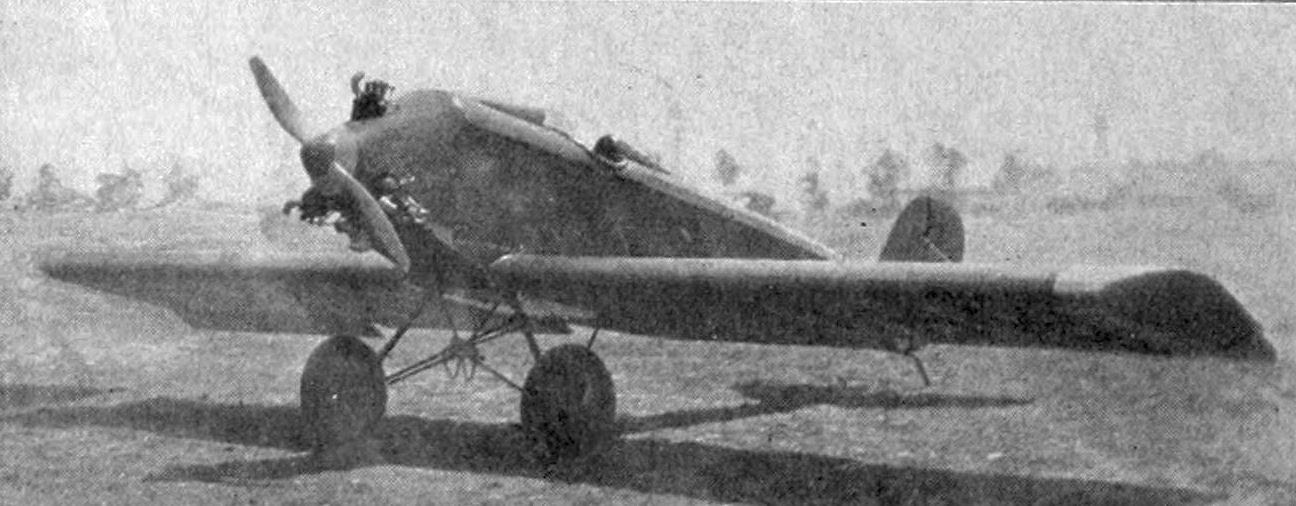

General information
- Type: Sportplane
- National origin: United States
- Manufacturer: Szekely Aircraft and Engine Company
- Designer: Peter Altman
- Number built: 21

History
- Manufactured: 1928–1929
- Introduction date: 1928 Los Angeles International Aircraft Show
- Developed from: Niles Aircraft Corporation Williams Gold Tip

The Szekely Model V Flying Dutchman is a single seat sport aircraft that was built by the aircraft engine manufacturer Szekely in Holland, Michigan in 1928–29.

== Development ==
The Flying Dutchman was designed in 1927 at the University of Detroit by professor Peter Altman. The aircraft was originally marketed by the Niles Aircraft Corporation as the Williams Gold Tip, powered by a three cylinder Anzani engine. The rights were purchased by Szekely to produce the aircraft using its own engine design. An airport was built in Holland to accommodate the company, opening on 28 August 1928, acquiring the name Szekely Airport in 1929. Szekely claimed a production capacity of 24 planes per week, though only 21 aircraft were produced in total. The Szekely company filed for bankruptcy in March 1932, and the factory assets were purchased by Michigan Bumper in 1936.

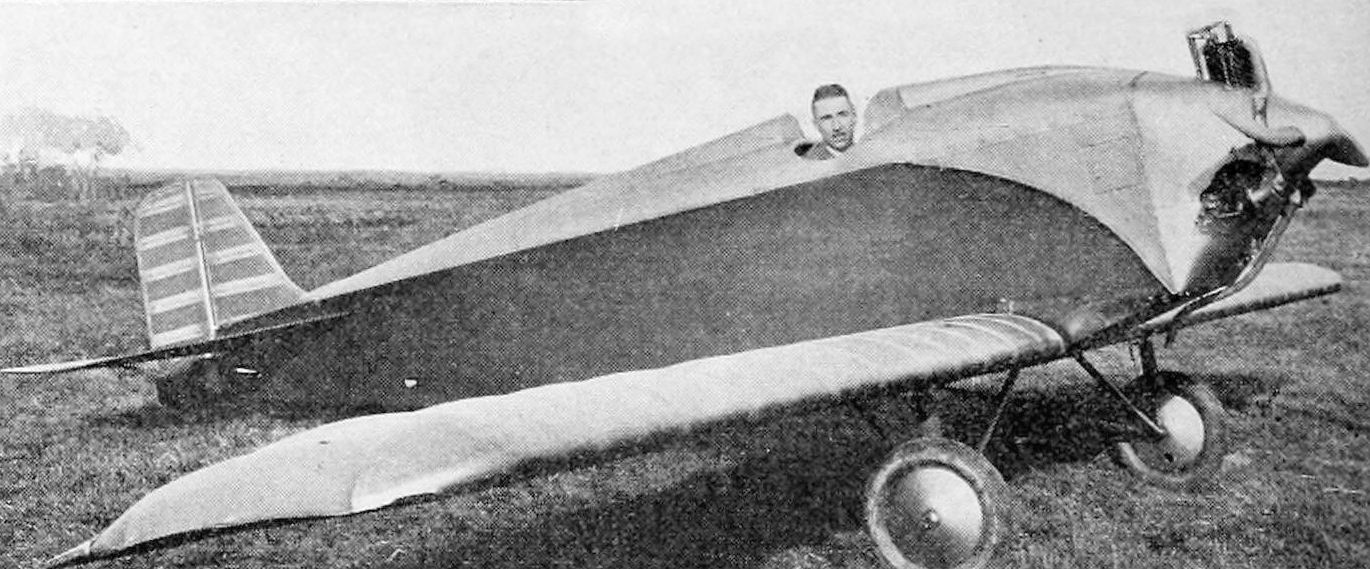
Niles-Williams Gold Tip photo from Aero Digest April 1928

== Design ==
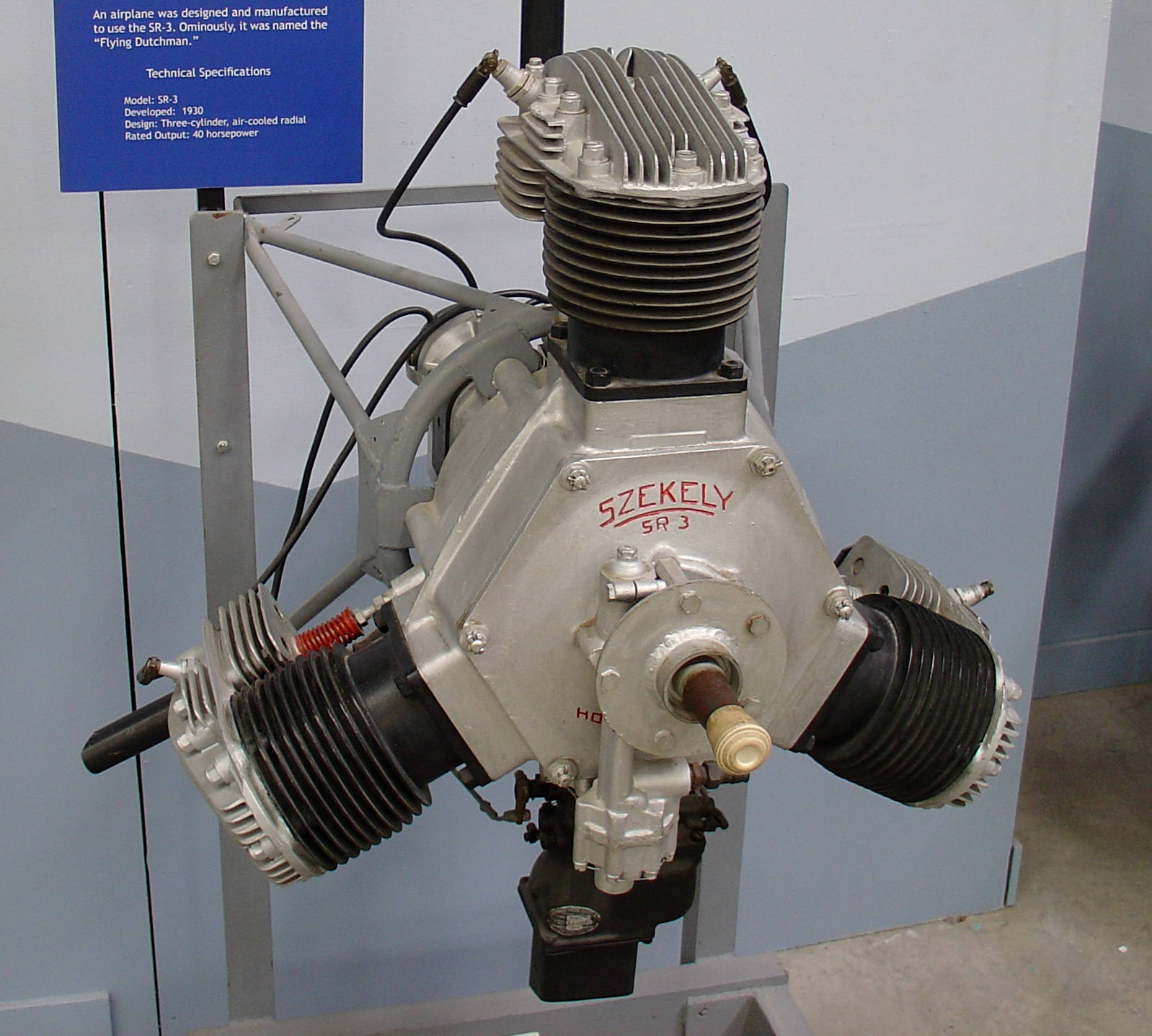
A Szekely 3 Cylinder engine

The Flying Dutchman is a single place, low wing, open cockpit monoplane with conventional landing gear and a 3-cylinder Szekely engine. The fuselage was made of welded steel tubing with aircraft fabric covering.

== Operational history ==
A Flying Dutchman was featured in the 1938 film Men with Wings.

== Variants ==
Niles Aircraft Corporation Williams Gold Tip
Anzani 3 cylinder power
Szekely Flying Dutchman
Szekely SR-3 3 cylinder power

== Specifications (Flying Dutchman) ==
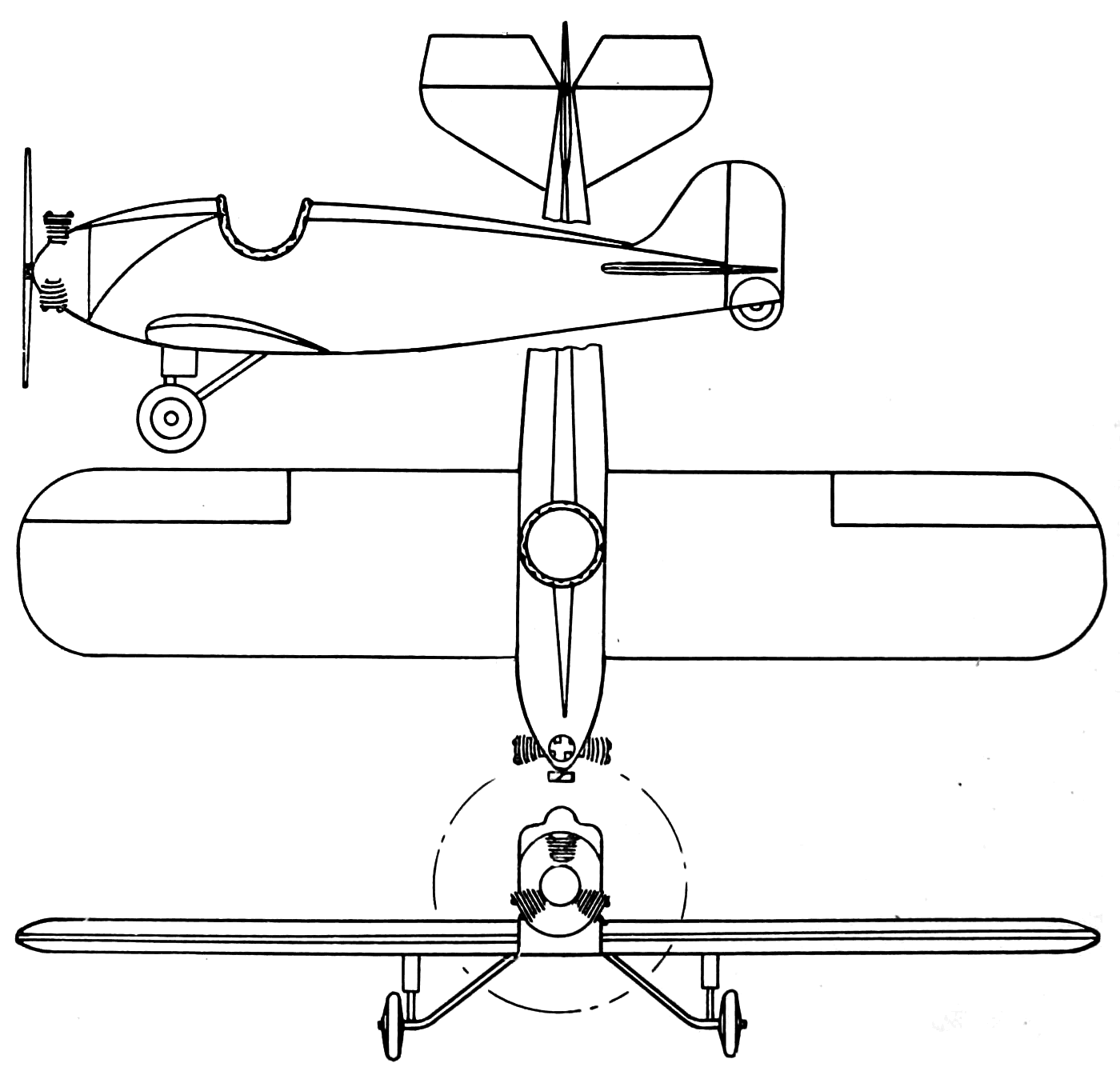
Niles-Williams Gold Tip 3-view drawing from Aero Digest April 1928

Data from Aeronautics

General characteristics

- Crew: 1
- Length: 18 ft 6 in (5.64 m)
- Wingspan: 26 ft (7.9 m)
- Gross weight: 850 lb (386 kg)
- Powerplant: 1 × Szekely SR-3 3 Cylinder Radial, 40 hp (30 kW)
- Propellers: 2-bladed

Performance

- Maximum speed: 83 kn (96 mph, 154 km/h)
- Stall speed: 26 kn (30 mph, 48 km/h)

== See also ==
Aircraft of comparable role, configuration, and era

- Ford Flivver
