= Boston Metropolitan Airport =

- IATA: none; ICAO: none

Summary
- Operator: Private (1931–1936); Town of Canton (1936–56)
- Location: Canton, Massachusetts
- Built: 1931
- In use: 1931–1956
- Elevation AMSL: 42 ft (13 m)
- Coordinates: 42.168°N 71.163°W
- Interactive map of Boston Metropolitan Airport

Boston Metropolitan Airport was an airfield in Canton, Massachusetts, on the northeast side of Neponset Street just southeast of the Neponset River.

Planning for an airport on the Norwood–Canton line began in 1930. The Boston Globe described the project as "the subject of considerable speculation and interest" in aviation circles due to crowding at the Boston Airport. Construction began in January 1931, with J. F. White Contracting Co. performing the work. In the 1930s it had four gravel runways.

After parimutuel betting was legalized in Massachusetts, the owners of the airport announced plans for a $2.5 million racetrack and airport on the property. In 1935, the Massachusetts Racing Commission chose to grant a license to Suffolk Downs in East Boston instead of the Boston Metropolitan Airport.

On November 16, 1936, the town of Canton voted to purchase the airport for $1. The purchase allowed the airport to receive $55,000 in federal funding that would only be available if it were public property.

Boston Metropolitan Airport failed to grow during the Great Depression and, during World War II, lost lucrative government contracts to nearby Hanscom Field. The town also failed to modernize the facility and the runways, which further led to its decline. In 1942, a Norwood town meeting approved the construction of a larger airport northeast of the Boston Metropolitan Airport. In 1946, Wiggins Airways, which had managed Boston Metropolitan Airport for many years, moved to Norwood Memorial Airport.

In 1948, Otto C. Koppen and Lynn Bollinger formed the Koppen-Bollinger Aircraft Corporation, which was later renamed the Helio Aircraft Company. After Helio merged with the Mid-States Manufacturing Corporation, Boston Metropolitan Airport was used as a research and development facility with some limited amounts of construction. In October 1963, Helio's first plane manufactured in Canton went into the National Air and Space Museum. In 1964, Helio left Canton for Hanscom Field.

The May 1956 sectional chart shows one 2100-ft turf runway; the airport is not on the December 1956 chart.

The airport is now the site of Farnham-Connolly State Park.
