= Norwood Memorial Airport =

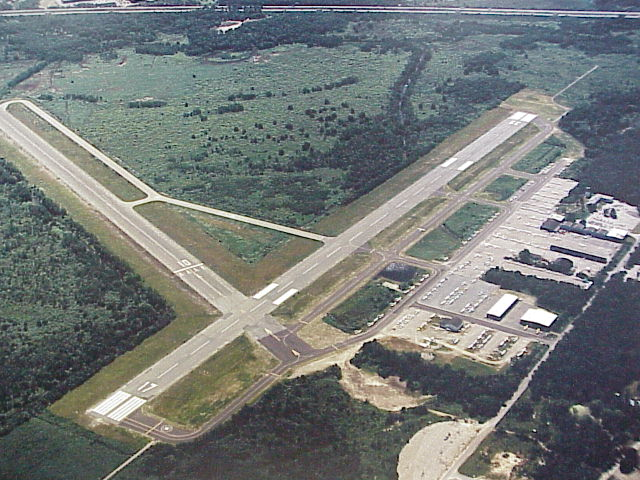
- IATA: OWD; ICAO: KOWD; FAA LID: OWD

Summary
- Owner: Town of Norwood
- Location: Norwood, Massachusetts
- Built: 1931
- Elevation AMSL: 49 ft / 15 m
- Coordinates: 42°11′26″N 071°10′23″W
- Website: Official website

Map
- Interactive map of Norwood Memorial Airport

Runways
Direction	Length		Surface
Direction	ft	m	Surface
17/35	4,007	1,222	Asphalt
10/28	3,995	1,218	Asphalt

Statistics
- Aircraft operations (2020): 58,628
- Based aircraft (2022): 101
- Source: Federal Aviation Administration

Norwood Memorial Airport (IATA: OWD, ICAO: KOWD, FAA LID: OWD) is a public airport 2 mi (1.7 nmi; 3.2 km) east of Norwood, in Norfolk County, Massachusetts, United States. It is home to the offices of prominent local business people and several maintenance facilities.

== History ==
In 1941, Norwood was considered for the site of the state's auxiliary airport. However, the legislative committee on military affairs and public safety chose Bedford, Massachusetts instead due to flooding that kept the proposed site under water for a considerable amount of time the previous spring.

In 1942, a Norwood town meeting approved the construction of the Norwood Airport on 400 acres northeast of the Boston Metropolitan Airport. The airport would be built at the cost of the federal government and be available for national defense needs. From 1942 to 1945, the airfield was a Naval Outlying Landing Field of Naval Air Station Squantum. It was used by student pilots to gain flight experience on its two 4,000 ft (1,200 m) runways.

In 1946, the United States Department of War turned over the airport to the town of Norwood. The airport was renamed the Norwood Memorial Airport in memory of Norwood residents who died in World War II. That same year, Wiggins Airways moved from Boston Metropolitan Airport in Canton to Norwood. Wiggins established regular passenger, cargo, and mail routes, operated a flight school, offered charter services, and maintained its parts and repair facilities at Norwood Memorial Airport. Wiggins remained at Norwood until 2001, when the economic effects of the September 11 attacks forced it end operations at the airport.

== Facilities ==
Norwood Memorial Airport covers 688 acres (278 ha) and has two runways:

- 17/35: 4,007 ft × 100 ft (1,221 m × 30 m), asphalt
- 10/28: 3,995 ft × 75 ft (1,218 m × 23 m), asphalt

In the year ending January 31, 2020 the airport had 58,628 aircraft operations, an average of 161 per day: 91% general aviation, 9% air taxi and less than 1% military.

In April 2022, there were 101 aircraft based at this airport: 72 single-engine, 9 multi-engine, 7 jet and 13 helicopter.

The airport has three flight schools and Flight Level Aviation as an FBO. Charter services operate commonly out of the airport.

Due to federal budget cuts the air traffic control tower was to close in 2013, but FAA funding was restored before closure took place.

== Airline and destinations ==
Airlines	Destinations
Cape Air	Seasonal: Nantucket

== Incidents ==
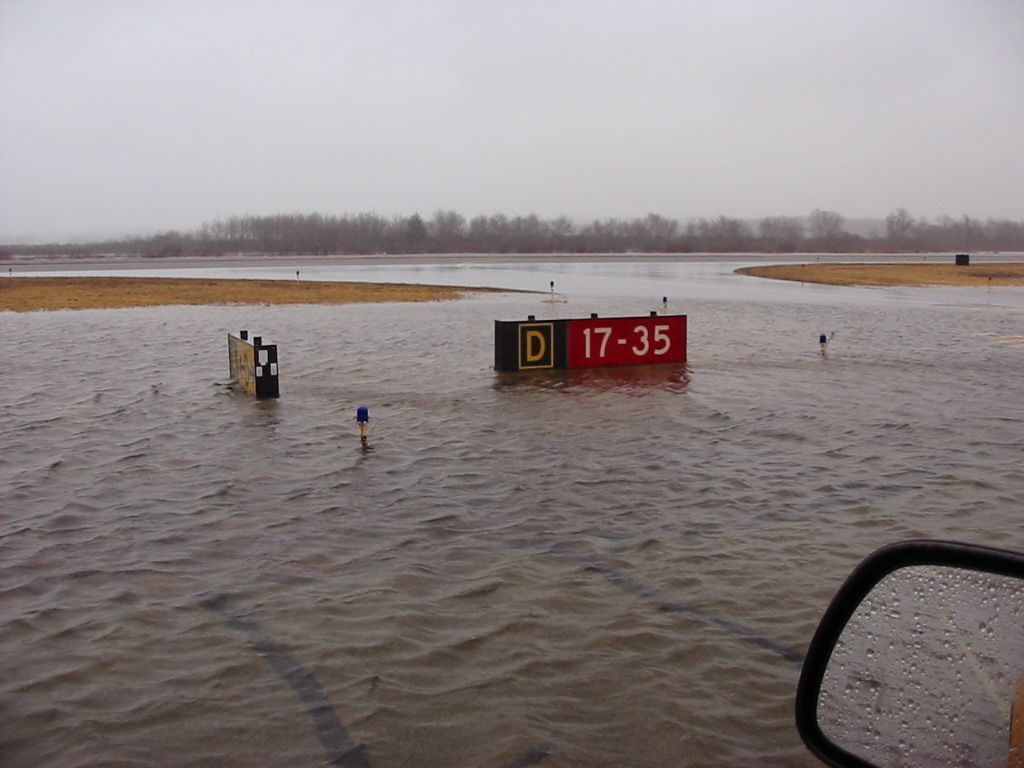
Flooding, 2010

On 4 June 2007 a Mooney M-20-P crashed into the woods south of the airport while on final approach. One person was killed.

In March 2010 the airport was temporarily closed due to severe flooding.

== See also ==
- List of airports in Massachusetts
