= Helio Rat'ler =

The Helio Rat'ler (as in Rattlesnake) was an agricultural spraying aircraft to be produced by Helio Aircraft. The aircraft featured the wings and tail of a Helio Courier on a new, low-wing fuselage, and a Lycoming IO-720 eight-cylinder engine producing 400 horsepower. The prototype Rat'ler (registered N4405S) was exhibited at the Agricultural Aviation Convention in Las Vegas in 1984.
