= Commuter Aircraft Corporation CAC-100 =

CAC-100

General information
- Type: Commuter airliner
- National origin: United States
- Manufacturer: Commuter Aircraft Corporation
- Designer: Ladislao Pazmany

History
- Developed from: General Aircraft Corporation GAC-100

The Commuter Aircraft Corporation CAC-100 was a 50–60 seat, four-engined, turboprop commuter airliner developed in the United States in the late 1970s and early 1980s.

== Design and development ==
The design of the CAC-100 originated from the General Aircraft Corporation GAC-100, designed in the late 1960s. The GAC-100 design was enlarged and new technologies incorporated to produce the CAC-100. The proposed production aircraft featured an extended span wing with leading edge slats removed to reduce structural complexity, weight and cost. Other changes under consideration at the time of initial production were direction of undercarriage retraction and retention of the variable incidence tailplane.

The CAC-100 was designed as a low-wing monoplane with four turboprop engines mounted on the leading edges of the wings. The wings were constructed as two-spar fail-safe structures from 2024-T4 light alloy supporting the engines, ailerons and hydraulically actuated single slotted flaps. Pneumatic de-icing boots on the fin and rudder leading edges ensured ice free operation.

The conventional tail unit incorporated a variable incidence tailplane with rudder and elevators all with trim tabs and servo tabs. Hydraulically actuated ailerons operated in conjunction with upper surface spoilers inboard of the ailerons and forward of the outer flap segment. All powered controls were also to be provided with manual cable-operated backups.

The tricycle landing gear consisted of hydraulically retracting nose and main gears with twin wheels and brakes on the mainwheels, with the nose gear retracting into the nose of the aircraft and the main legs retracting into extended inboard engine nacelles.

Power was to be supplied by four Pratt & Whitney Canada PT6A-65R turboprop engines driving five-bladed Hartzell Propeller constant speed reversible propellers.

Production facilities were constructed at Youngstown Municipal Airport in Youngstown, Ohio but the project was shelved in 1983 before its first flight.

== Specifications ==
Data from Jane's All the World's Aircraft 1982–83

General characteristics

- Crew: two flight crew + one / two cabin crew
- Capacity: 50–60
- Length: 71 ft 0 in (21.63 m)
- Wingspan: 74 ft 5 in (22.69 m)
- Height: 24 ft 11 in (7.6 m)
- Wing area: 500.0 sq ft (46.45 m^{2})
- Aspect ratio: 11.09
- Airfoil: NASA MS-1
- Empty weight: 22,816 lb (10,349 kg) typical operating empty weight
- Max takeoff weight: 37,501 lb (17,010 kg)
- Fuel capacity: 1,380 US gal (5,224 L; 1,149 imp gal) in four integral wing tanks
- Powerplant: 4 × Pratt & Whitney Canada PT6A-65R turboprop engines, 1,410 hp (1,050 kW) each
- Propellers: 5-bladed Hartzell Propeller constant speed reversible, 8 ft 8 in (2.64 m) diameter

Performance

- Cruise speed: 307 kn (353 mph, 569 km/h) at 20,000 ft (6,096 m)
- Range: 640 nmi (740 mi, 1,190 km) with 50 passengers, 200 lb (91 kg) and IFR fuel reserves
- Service ceiling: 25,000 ft (7,620 m) service ceiling with one engine out

== See also ==
Aircraft of comparable role, configuration, and era

- ATR 42 (48 seat turboprop, produced since 1984)
- de Havilland Canada Dash 7 (50 seat quad turboprop, produced 1975–1988)
- Fokker F27 Friendship (48-56 seat turboprop, produced 1955–1987)
- Hawker Siddeley HS 748 (40-58 seat turboprop, produced 1961-1988)
