= Otto C. Koppen =

American aircraft engineer

- Born: Otto Carl Koppen; 1901
- Died: 1991 (aged 89–90); Centerville, Massachusetts
- Education: MIT
- Occupation: aircraft engineer

Otto C. Koppen (1901 – 1991) was an American aircraft engineer.

== Early life ==
Otto Koppen graduated with a Bachelor of Science from MIT in 1924.

== MIT ==
Koppen was the professor emeritus of aeronautical engineering at the Massachusetts Institute of Technology. In 1929 Koppen returned to teach stability and control at MIT, where he remained until his retirement in 1965. As part of the course, Koppen took students up in a Fairchild 24 to demonstrate stability principles.

In 1936, Koppen published a paper called "SMART AIRPLANES FOR DUMB PILOTS".

In 1939, a student brought a model of the new Curtiss XSB2C-1 to the MIT wind tunnel. Koppen was quoted as saying, "if they build more than one of these, they are crazy". He was referencing controllability issues with the small vertical tail. The eventual production aircraft did have issues, and needed over 880 modifications before entering combat in WWII.

=== Project Whirlwind ===
In 1944 America recognized a need for a universal flight trainer more advanced than the analog Link Trainer. What started as the development of the Aircraft Stability and Control Analyzer (ASCA) for the Navy became "Project Whirlwind". Headed by Captain Luis deFlorez, Otto Koppen, John R. Markham, and Joseph Bicknell put together the requirements for a simulator that factored in winds and aerodynamic forces. The byproduct that was developed to compute the data was one of America's first high-speed, prototypical, digital computer.

Koppen took a two-year break from teaching after the loss of his daughter in a flight accident involving loss of control in low visibility conditions. Koppen promised his wife never to fly again afterward, but restarted after her death. Koppen flew a Grumman Yankee and experimented with wing-leveling and other controls. Koppen acquired his FAA instrument rating at the age of eighty. At one point Koppen was the oldest instrument rated pilot in America.

Koppen is regarded as providing the basis for most stability and control research since the 1930s.

== Designer ==
After a fire at the Stout Metal Airplane Division of the Ford Motor Company, which destroyed the Ford 3-AT Trimotor prototype, Tom Towle hired MIT graduate Otto Koppen, John Lee, and James Smith McDonnell (co-founder of what is now McDonnell Douglas).

Koppen, along with Harold Hicks and Tom Towle, are credited with refining the Stout-designed Ford 3-AT into the well known Ford Trimotor.

In 1926, Koppen designed the Ford Flivver. As the first criterion for the design was that it had to fit in an office, his first task was measuring the dimensions of Ford's office.

Koppen designed the Fairchild FT-1 in 1929. The aircraft was the model for the Fairchild Model 21, a two-seat low-wing aircraft that bore a similarity to the Ford Flivver. Production was halted during the depression.

In 1943 Koppen was brought on as an engineer to help design larger cargo aircraft for the Franklin Institute for 20,000 dollars a year.

He was a designer for General Aircraft Corporation. Koppen designed an early two-control aircraft, the General Skyfarer. Using just ailerons and elevators for directional control. 17 were built. The aircraft was later licensed as the Mars M1-80 Skycoupe, but did not go into production.

In 1949, Koppen, and Lynn Bollinger formed the Helio Corporation of Massachusetts. They developed a "helioplane" prototype for a cost of 6000 dollars that was built based on a modified Piper Vagabond with a short wing, with leading edge slats, with high lift and STOL capabilities. Greater Boston Metropolitan Airport fixed-base operator, E.W. Wiggins Airways converted the Piper PA-17 Vagabond with volunteer assistance to make the 2-place Helio No.1. Koppen also served as test pilot. This aircraft was the basis for the Helio Courier series of aircraft. The Helio Aircraft Corporation was formed in 1950 after merging with Midwest Aircraft Corporation, the company produced a variety of types for the Navy. The prototype aircraft "Helio-1" has been donated the National Air and Space Museum in 1963.

Following the death of his daughter in an airplane crash in November 1950, Koppen took a two year break in teaching.

Koppen developed a simplified autopilot that could be affordable enough to be used by general aviation aircraft. The bang-bang, or discontinuous, control device featured an innovative use of a tilted gyroscope that sensed roll and yaw, to provide input to the autopilot. After his formal NACA report was published, his ability to file for a patent was nullified.

In 1991 EAA Chapter 159 from Midland, Michigan, donated a replica Ford Flivver to the EAA Airventure Museum. The replica was built from careful inspection of the original prototype and advice from Otto C. Koppen.

He lived in Osterville, Massachusetts. He won the 1957 Godfrey L. Cabot Award. Otto Koppen died at the age of 90.

== Gallery ==
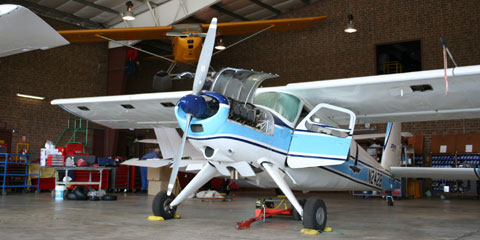
Helio Courier

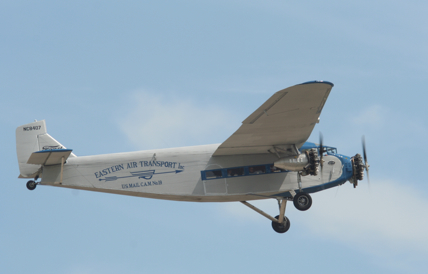
Ford Trimotor

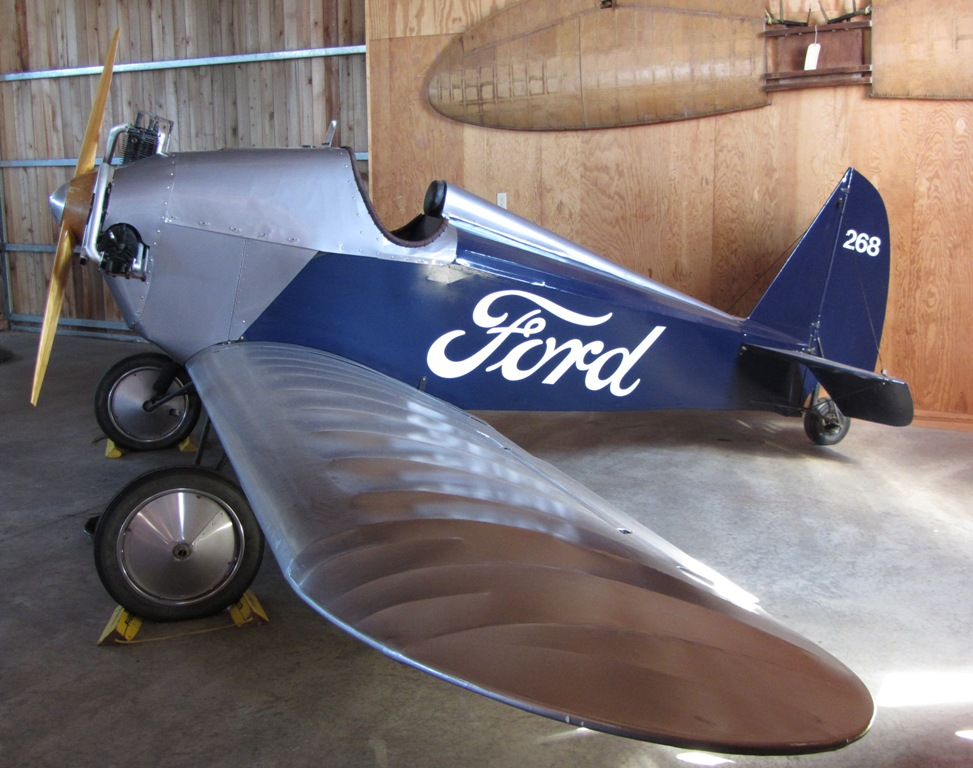
Ford Flivver

== See also ==
Other pioneers of aircraft stability and control

- G.H. Bryan - Great Britain
- Leonard Bairstow
- Ernest E Relf
- William J Duncan
- Kyūichirō Washizu - Japan
- Frederic Charles Haus - Belgium
- Otto H Gerlac - Germany
- Karl H Doetsch - Germany
