= Zhenwu Pavilion =

- 真武阁
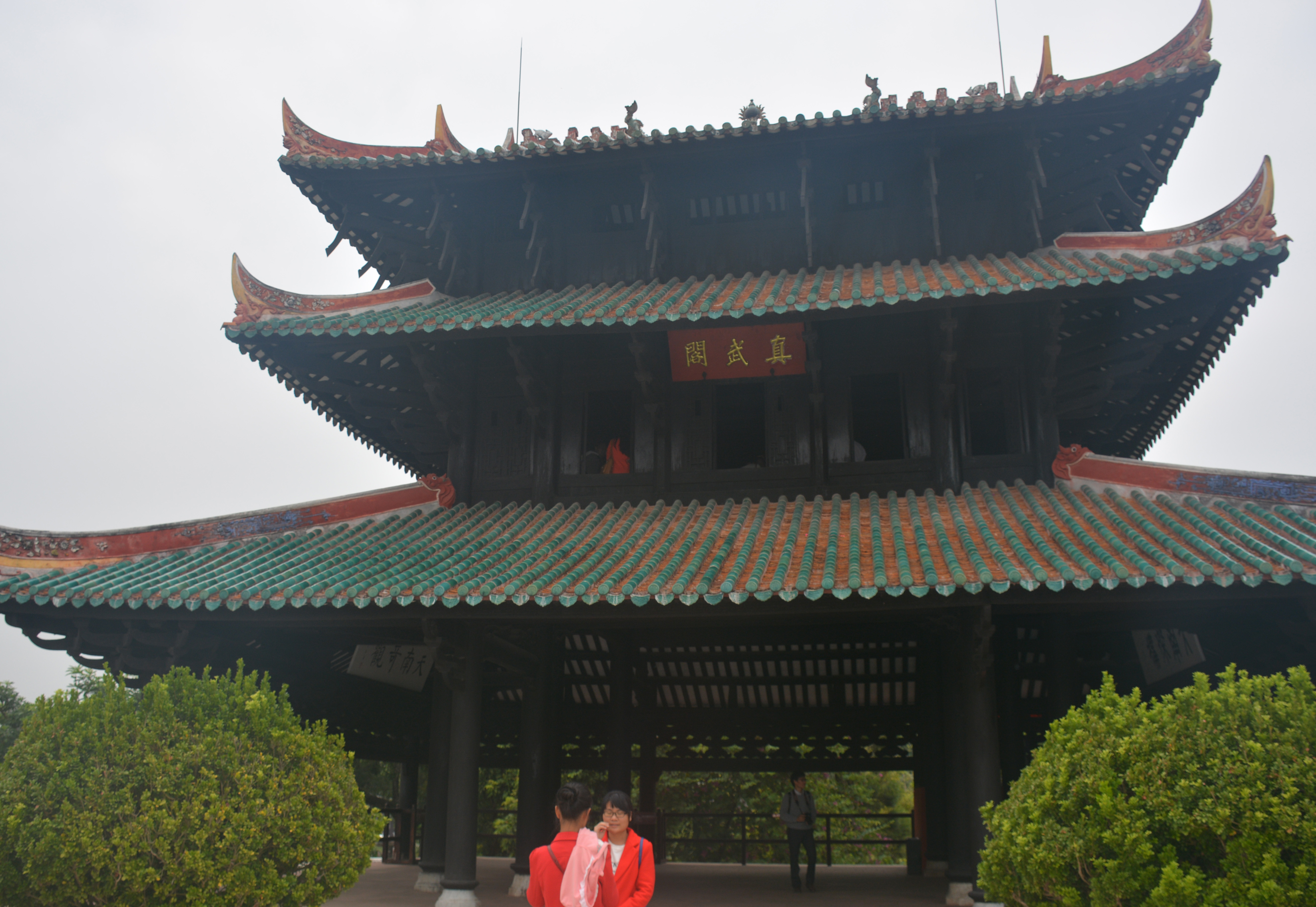
- Zhenwu Pavilion in 2016

- Location within Guangxi

General information
- Type: Pavilion
- Location: Rong County, Guangxi, China
- Coordinates: 22°51′30″N 110°33′23″E
- Construction started: 758–779
- Renovated: 1573 (reconstruction)

Height
- Architectural: Chinese architecture

Technical details
- Material: Wood, stone, brick
- Floor area: 168.00 m^{2} (1,808.3 sq ft)

Zhenwu Pavilion (simplified Chinese: 真武阁; traditional Chinese: 真武閣; pinyin: Zhēnwǔ Gé) is a Chinese pavilion located in Rong County, Guangxi. Alongside Yuejiang Tower, Xie Tiao Tower and Zhenhai Tower, it is one of the Four Great Towers of Jiangnan.

== History ==
The original pavilion dates back to the 8th century, founded by Yuan Jie, a poet and official of the Tang dynasty (618–907).

In 1377, at the dawn of the Ming dynasty (1368–1644), local officials built a Taoist temple named "Xuanwu Palace" (玄武宫) on the former site. It was enlarged in 1573, in the ruling of Wanli Emperor, and renamed "Zhenwu Pavilion", which is still in use now.

On 23 February 1982, it was listed among the second batch of "Major National Historical and Cultural Sites in Guangxi" by the State Council of China. On 25 August 2017, it has been rated as a national AAAA level scenic spot by the China National Tourism Administration.

== Architecture ==
Zhenwu Pavilion is a three-story wooden structure with a gable and hip roof (歇山顶). It is 13.8-metre (45 ft) wide, 11.2-metre (37 ft) deep and 20-metre (66 ft) high and preserves the largest, grandest and most magnificent hall in Guangxi.
