= Daba, Guangxi =

Daba 大坝镇
- Town
- Location in Guangxi
- Coordinates: 21°39′52″N 109°48′53″E
- Country: People's Republic of China
- Autonomous region: Guangxi
- Prefecture-level city: Yulin
- County: Bobai County
- Time zone: UTC+8 (China Standard)

Daba (simplified Chinese: 大坝; traditional Chinese: 大垻; pinyin: Dàbà) is a town under the administration of Bobai County, Guangxi, China. As of 2020, it administers Daba Residential Neighborhood and the following six villages:

- Qingshan Village (青山村)
- Guanling Village (官岭村)
- Dayi Village (大益村)
- Zhuling Village (诸岭村)
- Jiufu Village (久福村)
- Nalei Village (那雷村)
