= Xie Tiao Tower =

- 谢朓楼
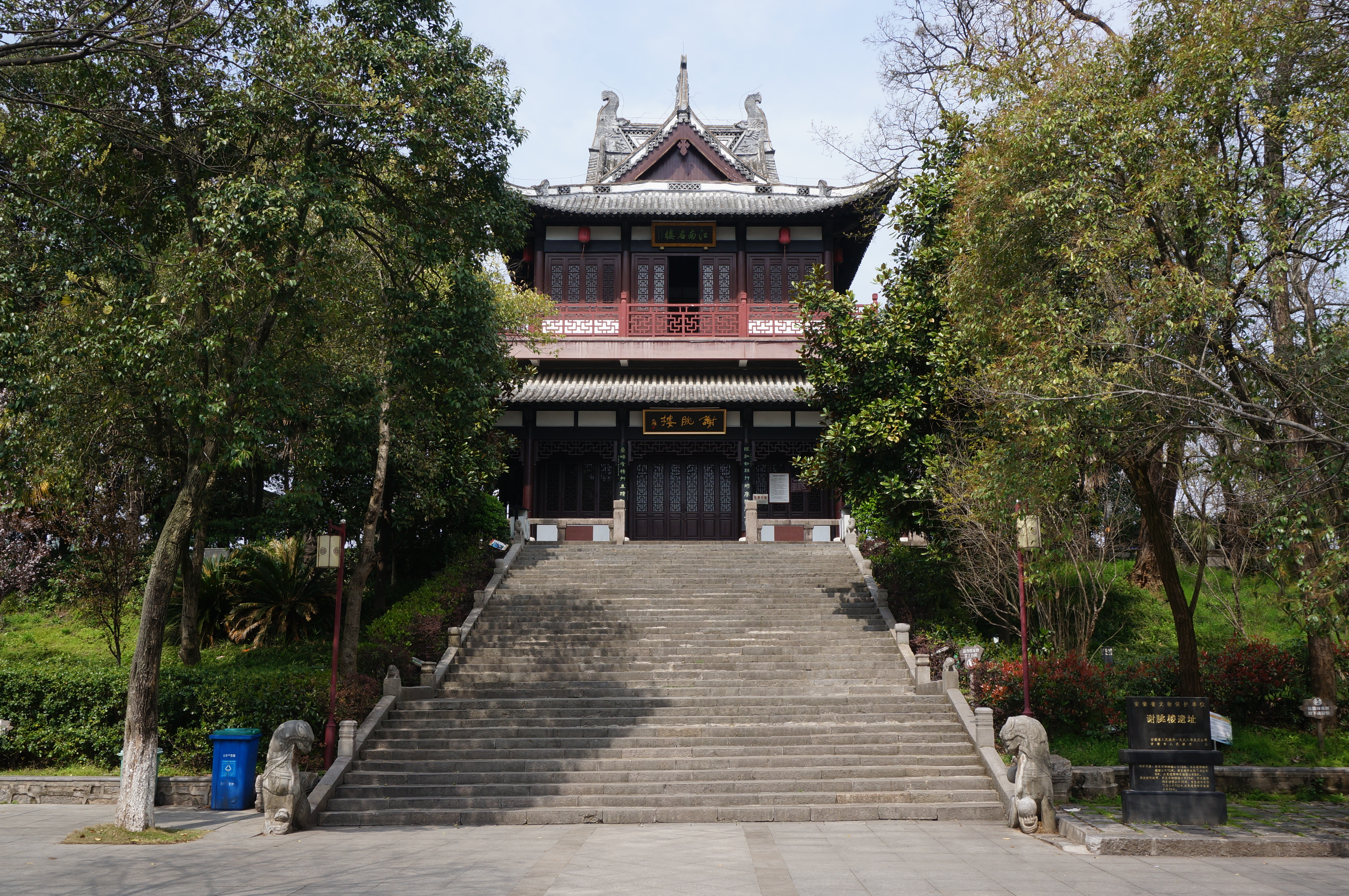
- Xie Tiao Tower in March 2021

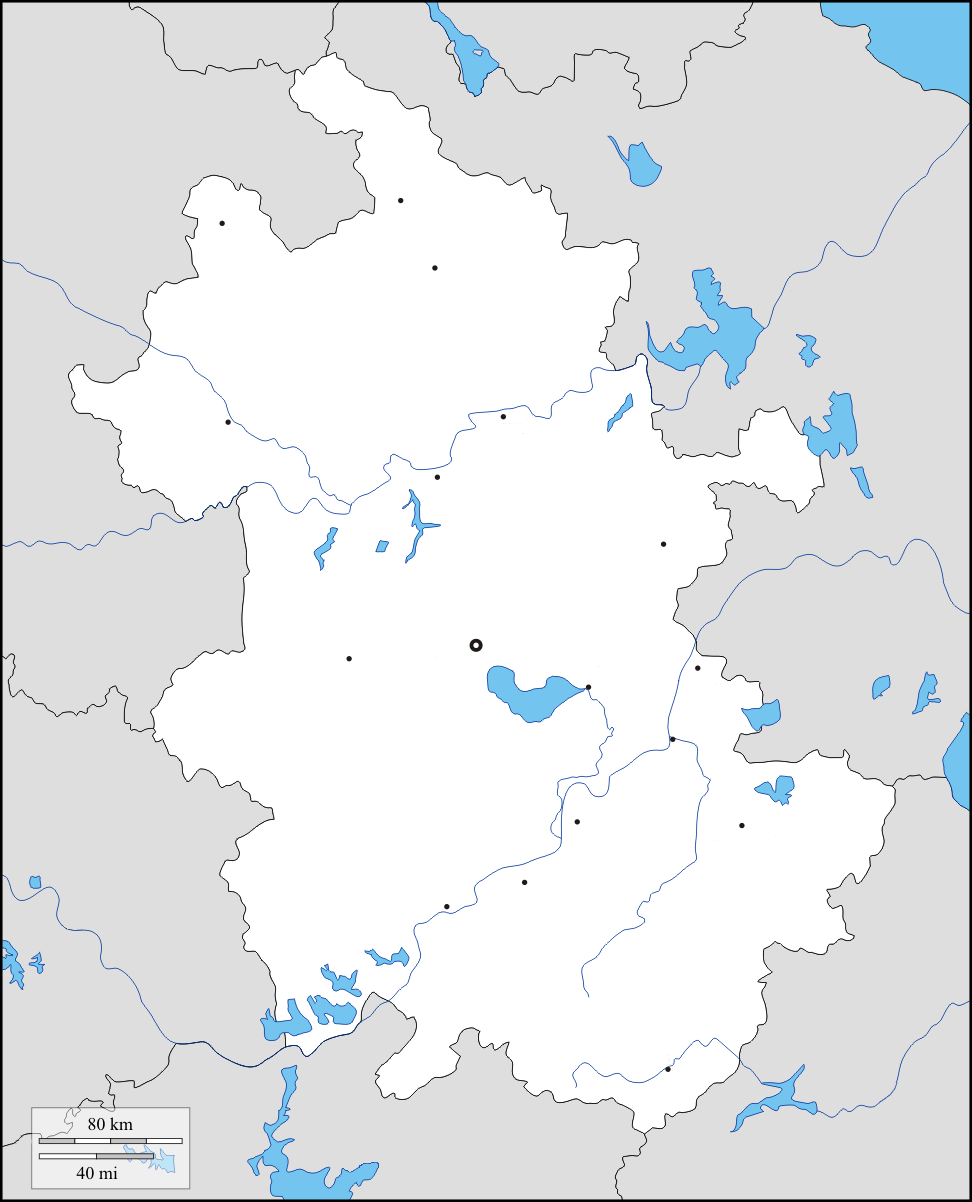
- Location within Anhui

General information
- Type: Tower
- Location: Xuanzhou District of Xuancheng, Anhui, China
- Coordinates: 30°57′17″N 118°46′04″E
- Groundbreaking: Tang dynasty
- Renovated: 1997 (reconstruction)
- Demolished: 1937
- Affiliation: Xuancheng municipal government

Height
- Architectural: Chinese architecture

Technical details
- Material: Wood, cement
- Floor area: 1,500 m^{2} (16,000 sq ft)

Xie Tiao Tower (simplified Chinese: 谢朓楼; traditional Chinese: 謝朓樓; pinyin: Xiè Tiǎo Lóu) is a Chinese tower located in Xuanzhou District of Xuancheng, Anhui. Alongside Yuejiang Tower, Zhenwu Pavilion and Zhenhai Tower, it is one of the Four Great Towers of Jiangnan.

== History ==
In 495, during the Southern Qi (479–502), Xie Tiao became governor of Xuancheng Commandery, he built a tower on Yangling Mountain (a part of Mount Jiuhua), and named it "Gaozhai" (高斋).

In the Tang dynasty (618–907), local people rebuilt a tower "Beiwang Tower" (北望楼) in memory of Xie Tiao, commonly known as "Xie Tiao Tower" (谢朓楼). The tower became world famous after poet Li Bai's poems. In 874, local governor Dugu Lin (独孤霖) rebuilt it and changed its name to "Diezhang Tower" (叠嶂楼).

In the Jiajing period of the Ming dynasty (1368–1644), magistrate Fang Fengshi (方逢时) rebuilt the tower and reverted to its former name of "Gaozhai" (高斋).

In the Kangxi period of the Qing dynasty (1644–1912), magistrate Xu Tingshi (许廷式) reconstructed the tower and renamed it "Gubei Tower" (古北楼). In the ruling of Guangxu Emperor, magistrate Lu Yiyuan (鲁一员) reconstructed again and reverted to its former name of "Xie Tiao Tower" (谢朓楼).

The tower was completely destroyed in 1937 during the Second Sino-Japanese War. It was rebuilt in 1997 with a floor area of 1,500 m^{2} (16,000 sq ft). In May 1998, it was designated as a provincial cultural relic preservation organ by the Anhui Provincial People's Government.
