= Bobai County =

Bobai County 博白县 · Bozbwz Yen Pokpak
- County
- Location of the seat in Guangxi
- Coordinates: 22.2758°N 109.972°E
- Country: China
- Autonomous region: Guangxi
- Prefecture-level city: Yulin
- County seat: Bobai Town

Area
  - Total: 3,836 km^{2} (1,481 sq mi)

Population (2020)
  - Total: 1,390,612
  - Density: 362.5/km^{2} (938.9/sq mi)
- Time zone: UTC+8 (China Standard)

Bobai (Chinese: 博白; pinyin: Bóbái; Zhuang: Bozbwz) is a county of Guangxi, China. It is under the administration of Yulin city.

Bobai was the home town of the linguist Wang Li, who described the Bobai dialect with its unusually large number of tones.

== Administrative divisions ==
Bobai County is divided into 28 towns:

- Bobai 博白镇
- Shuangfeng 双凤镇
- Dungu 顿谷镇
- Shuiming 水鸣镇
- Nalin 那林镇
- Jiangning 江宁镇
- Santan 三滩镇
- Huangling 黄凌镇
- Yashan 亚山镇
- Wangmao 旺茂镇
- Dongping 东平镇
- Shahe 沙河镇
- Lingjiao 菱角镇
- Xintian 新田镇
- Fengshan 凤山镇
- Ningtan 宁潭镇
- Wendi 文地镇
- Yingqiao 英桥镇
- Nabu 那卜镇
- Dadong 大垌镇
- Shabei 沙陂镇
- Shuangwang 双旺镇
- Songwang 松旺镇
- Longtan 龙潭镇
- Daba 大坝镇
- Yong'an 永安镇
- Jingkou 径口镇
- Langping 浪平镇

== Transportation ==
The county is served by the Yulin–Tieshangang railway. The railway opened for freight service in May 2015. Passenger service to Bobai railway station started on April 1, 2016.

== Contestation and protests ==
In May 2007, Bobai was the site of large protests held by local people against China's one-child policy, and triggered the protest in Yangmei, Rongxian.

The small office of a grassroots non-governmental organization (NGO) for sex workers' rights was ransacked and its leader Ye Haiyan was also attacked.

== Climate ==
Climate data for Bobai, elevation 86 m (282 ft), (1991–2020 normals, extremes 1981–present)
Month	Jan	Feb	Mar	Apr	May	Jun	Jul	Aug	Sep	Oct	Nov	Dec	Year
Record high °C (°F)	28.5 (83.3)	31.4 (88.5)	33.6 (92.5)	35.6 (96.1)	35.9 (96.6)	36.9 (98.4)	38.9 (102.0)	37.6 (99.7)	36.6 (97.9)	35.7 (96.3)	33.1 (91.6)	29.8 (85.6)	38.9 (102.0)
Mean daily maximum °C (°F)	18.1 (64.6)	19.8 (67.6)	22.5 (72.5)	27.1 (80.8)	30.8 (87.4)	32.2 (90.0)	32.8 (91.0)	32.9 (91.2)	31.9 (89.4)	29.3 (84.7)	25.4 (77.7)	20.6 (69.1)	27.0 (80.5)
Daily mean °C (°F)	13.9 (57.0)	15.8 (60.4)	18.7 (65.7)	23.2 (73.8)	26.4 (79.5)	27.9 (82.2)	28.2 (82.8)	28.1 (82.6)	27.0 (80.6)	24.3 (75.7)	20.3 (68.5)	15.7 (60.3)	22.5 (72.4)
Mean daily minimum °C (°F)	11.1 (52.0)	13.1 (55.6)	16.1 (61.0)	20.5 (68.9)	23.5 (74.3)	25.2 (77.4)	25.4 (77.7)	25.2 (77.4)	23.9 (75.0)	20.9 (69.6)	16.8 (62.2)	12.5 (54.5)	19.5 (67.1)
Record low °C (°F)	2.3 (36.1)	2.3 (36.1)	3.3 (37.9)	9.0 (48.2)	15.0 (59.0)	18.5 (65.3)	20.6 (69.1)	21.5 (70.7)	15.7 (60.3)	10.1 (50.2)	4.8 (40.6)	2.1 (35.8)	2.1 (35.8)
Average precipitation mm (inches)	54.1 (2.13)	46.9 (1.85)	80.6 (3.17)	151.9 (5.98)	234.2 (9.22)	272.5 (10.73)	321.0 (12.64)	268.8 (10.58)	172.5 (6.79)	82.3 (3.24)	59.5 (2.34)	39.1 (1.54)	1,783.4 (70.21)
Average precipitation days (≥ 0.1 mm)	9.6	11.0	15.3	14.5	17.3	19.5	18.9	18.5	13.6	6.6	6.5	7.2	158.5
Average relative humidity (%)	77	79	83	82	81	83	82	83	79	74	72	71	79
Mean monthly sunshine hours	86.0	66.2	58.7	90.3	151.3	156.6	191.6	191.3	189.1	196.4	156.2	131.6	1,665.3
Percentage possible sunshine	25	20	16	24	37	39	47	48	52	55	47	39	37
Source: China Meteorological Administrationall-time October record high
