= Jiangning, Guangxi =

Jiangning 江宁镇
- Town
- Location in Guangxi
- Coordinates: 22.1599°N 109.6212°E
- Country: People's Republic of China
- Autonomous Region: Guangxi
- Prefecture-level city: Yulin
- County: Bobai County
- Time zone: UTC+8 (China Standard)

Jiangning (Chinese: 江宁; pinyin: Jiāngníng) is a town in Bobai County, Guangxi, China. As of 2020, it administers Jiangning Street Community (江宁街社区) and the following eleven villages:

- Jiangning Village
- Muwang Village (木旺村)
- Fangwu Village (芳屋村)
- Changjiang Village (长江村)
- Hehe Village (合和村)
- Daogen Village (道根村)
- Hebang Village (和邦村)
- Dazhong Village (大中村)
- Lüjia Village (绿佳村)
- Silian Village (四联村)
- Taiping Village (太平村)
