= Yangmei, Rong County =

Town in Rong, Yulin, Guangxi, China

Yangmei 杨梅镇
- Town
- Location in Jiangsu
- Coordinates: 22.7055°N 110.6515°E
- Country: People's Republic of China
- Autonomous region: Guangxi
- Prefecture-level city: Yulin
- County: Rong County
- Time zone: UTC+8 (China Standard)

Yangmei (Chinese: 杨梅; pinyin: Yángméi) is a town located in Rong County, Yulin, Guangxi, China. It is named after the fruit yangmei (Myrica rubra).

The town's population is approximately 5,300. In May 2007, affected by the protest of Bobai, Yangmei was the site of large protests held by local people against China's one-child policy.
