= Bobai railway station =

Railway station in Yulin, Guangxi, China

Bobai 博白
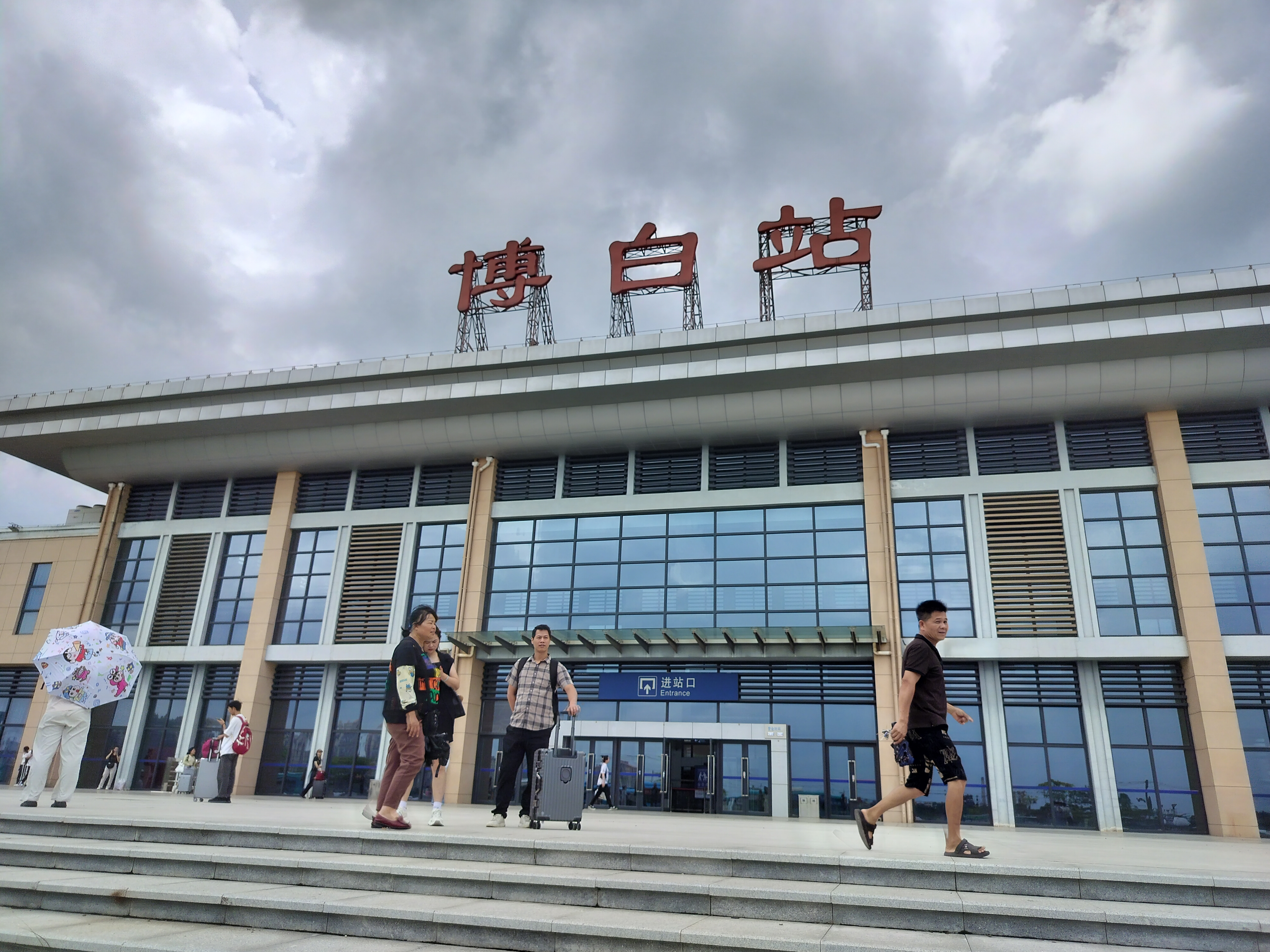

General information
- Location: Bobai County, Yulin, Guangxi; China
- Coordinates: 22.2343°N 109.9894°E
- Line(s): Yulin–Tieshangang railway

History
- Opened: 1 May 2015 (freight); 1 April 2016 (passengers)
Location

Bobai railway station (Chinese: 博白站) is a railway station located in Bobai County, Yulin, Guangxi, China. It is an intermediate station on the Yulin–Tieshangang railway but is the terminus for passenger service. There is one service per day to and from Nanning railway station.

== History ==
Freight service began on 1 May 2015. Passenger service began on 1 April 2016.
