= Bobai dialect =

Yue Chinese dialect spoken in Guangxi

Bobai
- Native to: Southern China
- Region: Bobai
- Language family: Sino-Tibetan: Sinitic; Chinese; Yue; Goulou; Yulin; Bobai

Language codes
- ISO 639-3: –
- Glottolog: None

Bobai (地佬話, or 博白話) is a Yue Chinese dialect spoken in Bobai County, Guangxi. It was documented by the Chinese linguist Wang Li, a native speaker, and is well known for its tone system.

== Tone ==
Bobai dialect is widely cited as having the most tones of any variety of Chinese, though in fact it only has six, the same as most Yue dialects. The reason for the claim is that Bobai makes a four-way tonal distinction in checked syllables, whereas most other Yue dialects have three: In Bobai, both the lower and upper entering tone is split (8a and 8b as well as 7a and 7b), whereas in Cantonese only 7 is split; other dialects with an 8 split are neighboring Yangjiang and Pinghua, though in the latter at least 7 is not split, and 8 split along different lines.

Tone chart of Bobai dialect
Tone number	Tone name	Tone contour
1	yin ping (陰平)	˦ (4)
2	yang ping (陽平)	˨˧ (23)
3	yin shang (陰上)	˧ (3)
4	yang shang (陽上)	˦˥ (45)
5	yin qu (陰去)	˧˨ (32)
6	yang qu (陽去)	˨˩ (21)
7a	yin ru (陰入)	˥˦ (54)
7b	yin ru (陰入)	˩ (1)
8a	yang ru (陽入)	˦ (4)
8b	yang ru (陽入)	˧˨ (32)

Tones 7b and 8a occur with long vowels, 7a and 8b elsewhere.
