= Yulin railway station =

Railway station in Guangxi, China

Yulin 玉林
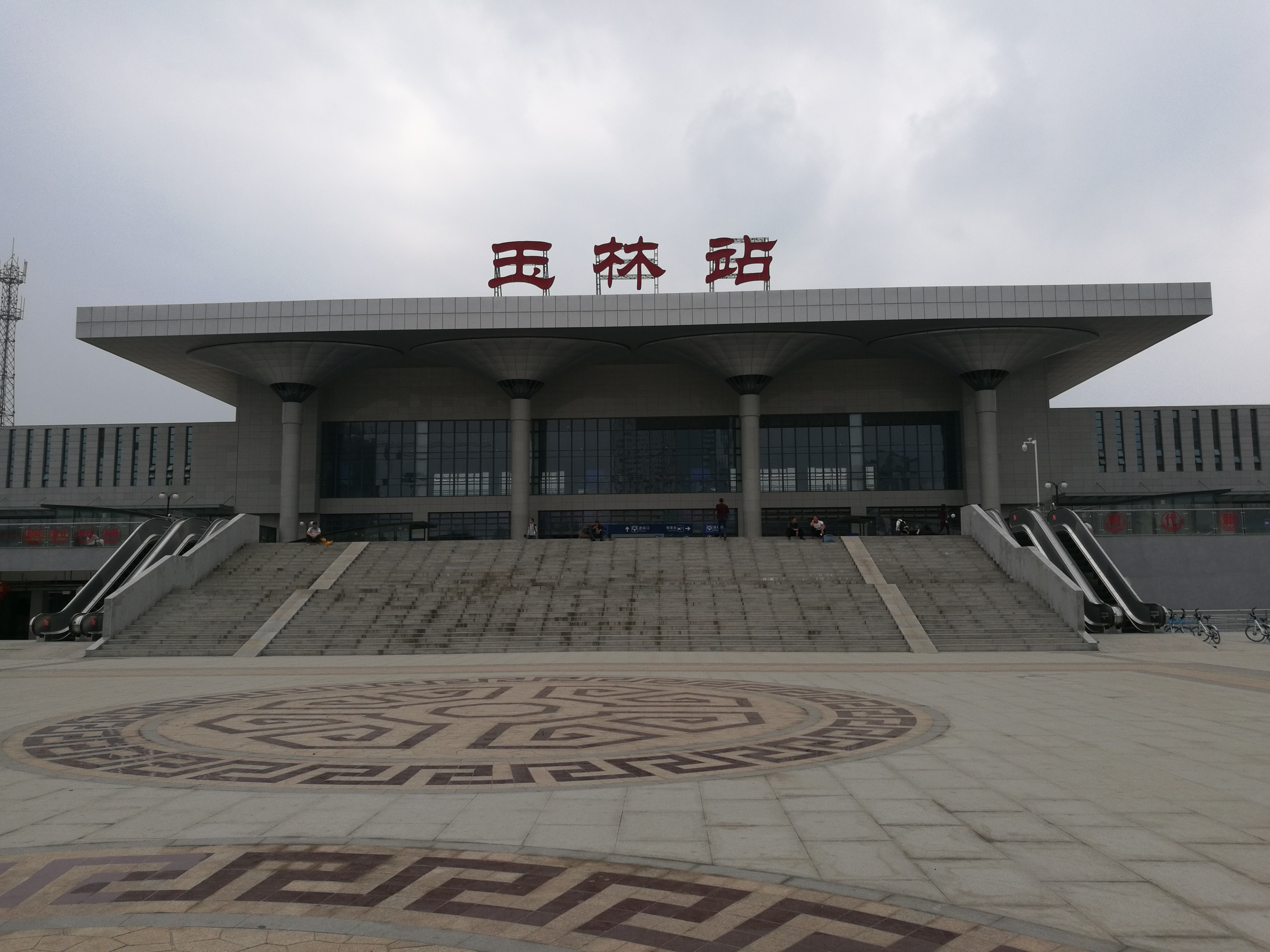

General information
- Location: Yuzhou District, Yulin, Guangxi; China
- Coordinates: 22.6007°N 110.1524°E
- Line(s): Litang–Zhanjiang railway Luoyang–Zhanjiang railway Yulin–Tieshangang railway

History
- Opened: 1 January 1956

Yulin railway station (Chinese: 玉林站) is a railway station located in Yuzhou District, Yulin, Guangxi, China.

== History ==
The station opened on 1 January 1956, shortly after the completion of the Litang–Zhanjiang railway. In 1996 the station was upgraded from second to first class. On 30 September 2016 the new station building was opened.
