= List of Major National Historical and Cultural Sites in Guangxi =

This list is of Major Sites Protected for their Historical and Cultural Value at the National Level in Guangxi Zhuang Autonomous Region, China.

Site	Chinese name	Location	Designation	Image
Site of the Jintian Uprising	Jintian qiyi dizhi 金田起义地址	Guiping	1-2	Upload file
Zhenwu Pavilion and Jinglüe Platform	Jinglüe tai Zhenwu ge 经略台真武阁	Rong County	2-33	Upload file
Chengyang Yongji Bridge	Chengyang Yongji qiao 程阳永济桥	25°54′02″N 109°38′16″E Sanjiang County	2-42	Upload file
Sites of the Former Headquarters of the 7th and 8th Army of the Red Army	Zhongguo gongye hongjun di-qi jun, di-ba jun junbu jiuzhi 中国工农红军第七军、第八军军部旧址	Baise	3-28	Upload file
Lingqu	Lingqu 灵渠	25°35′56″N 110°41′23″E Xing'an County	3-54	Upload file
Dashi Temple	Dashi ge 大士阁	Hepu County	3-103	Upload file
Huashan Rock Art	Huashan yanhua 花山岩画	Ningming County	3-165	Upload file
Hepu Han Tombs	Hepu Han muqun 合浦汉墓群	Hepu County	4-65	Upload file
Office of Mo Tusi	Mo tusi yashu 莫土司衙署	Xincheng County	4-153	Upload file
Palace and Mausoleums of Princes of Jingjiang	Jingjiang wangfu ji Jingjiang wangling 靖江王府及靖江王陵	25°09′41″N 110°10′23″E Guilin	4-154	Upload file
Former Residence of Li Zongren	Li Zongren guju 李宗仁故居	Lingui County	4-223	Upload file
Former Residence of Li Jishen	Li Jishen guju 李济深故居	Cangwu County	4-224	Upload file
Youjiang Democratic Government of Workers and Peasants	Youjiang gongnong minzhu zhengfu jiuzhi 右江工农民主政府旧址	Tiandong County	4-231	Upload file
Guilin Office of the Eighth Route Army	Balujun Guilin banshichu jiuzhi 八路军桂林办事处旧址	Guilin	4-240	Upload file
Baigu and Gaolingpo sites	Bogu he Gaolingpo yizhi 百谷和高岭坡遗址	Baise	5-99	Upload file
Zengpiyan site	Zengpiyan yizhi 甑皮岩遗址	Guilin	5-100	Upload file
Dingsishan site	Dingsishan yizhi 顶蛳山遗址	Nanning	5-101	Upload file
Batuan Bridge	Batuan qiao 岜团桥	Sanjiang County	5-378	Upload file
Linhe Old City	Linhe gucheng 临贺故城	Hezhou	5-379	Upload file
Stone Carvings of Guilin	Guilin shike 桂林石刻	Guilin	5-462	Upload file
Modern Architecture of Beihai	Beihai jindai jianzhu 北海近代建筑	Beihai	5-504	Upload file
Old Architecture of the Former Residences of Liu Yongfu and Feng Zicai	Liu Yongfu, Feng Zicai jiuju gu jianzhuqun 刘永福、冯子材旧居建筑群	Qinzhou 钦州市	5-505	Upload file
Bailian Cave	Bailiandong yizhi 白莲洞遗址	Liuzhou	6-169	Upload file
Liyuzui site	Liyuzui yizhi 鲤鱼嘴遗址	Liuzhou	6-170	Upload file
Gantuoyan site	Gantuoyan yizhi 感驮岩遗址	Napo County	6-171	Upload file
Qincheng site	Qincheng yizhi 秦城遗址	Xing'an County	6-172	Upload file
Zhicheng ruins	Zhicheng chengzhi 智城城址	Shanglin County	6-173	Upload file
Old Architecture of Jiangtou and Changgangling Villages	Jiangtoucun he Changganglingcun gu jianzhuqun 江头村和长岗岭村古建筑群	Lingchuan County	6-688	Upload file
Mayin Temple	Mayin miao 马殷庙	Fuchuan County	6-689	Upload file
Yanwolou	Yanwo lou 燕窝楼	Quanzhou County	6-690	Upload file
Old Architecture of Gongcheng	Gongcheng gu jianzhuqun 恭城古建筑群	Gongcheng County	6-691	Upload file
Steles of the Liuhou Temple	Liuhou ci beike 柳侯祠碑刻	Liuzhou	6-850	Upload file
Liancheng fortresses and Friendship Pass	Liancheng yaosai jiuzhi he youyi guan 连城要塞遗址和友谊关	Beihai, Fangchenggang, Ningming County, Pingxiang, Longzhou County, Daxin County, Jingxi County, Napo County	6-1021	Upload file
Modern Architecture of Rong County	Rong xian jindai jianzhu 容县近代建筑	Rong County	6-1022	Upload file
Site of Yong'an activities of the Taiping Rebellion	Taiping tianguo Yong'an huodong jiuzhi 太平天国永安活动旧址	Mengshan County	6-1023	Upload file
Mapang Drum Tower	Mapang gulou 马胖鼓楼	Sanjiang County	6-1024	Upload file
Zhongshan Memorial Hall, Wuzhou	Wuzhou Zhongshan jiniantang 梧州中山纪念堂	Wuzhou	6-1025	Upload file
Peasant Movement Institute, Guangxi	Guangxi nongmin yundong jiangxisuo jiuzhi 广西农民运动讲习所旧址	Donglan County	6-1026	Upload file
Red Army Slogans Building	Hongjun biaoyu lou 红军标语楼	Hechi	6-1027	Upload file
Site of the Battle of Xiangjiang	Xiang Jiang zhanyi jiuzhi 湘江战役旧址	Xing'an County	6-1028	Upload file
Site of the Battle of Kunlun Pass	Kunlun guan zhanyi jiuzhi 昆仑关战役旧址	Nanning	6-1029	Upload file
Former Residence of Ho Chi Minh	Hu Zhiming jiuju 胡志明旧居	Liuzhou	6-1030	Upload file

== See also ==
- Principles for the Conservation of Heritage Sites in China
