= Yulin Normal University =

University in Yulin, Guangxi, China

Coordinates: 22.67654°N 110.19894°E

- 玉林师范学院 • Yilinz Swhfan Yozyen
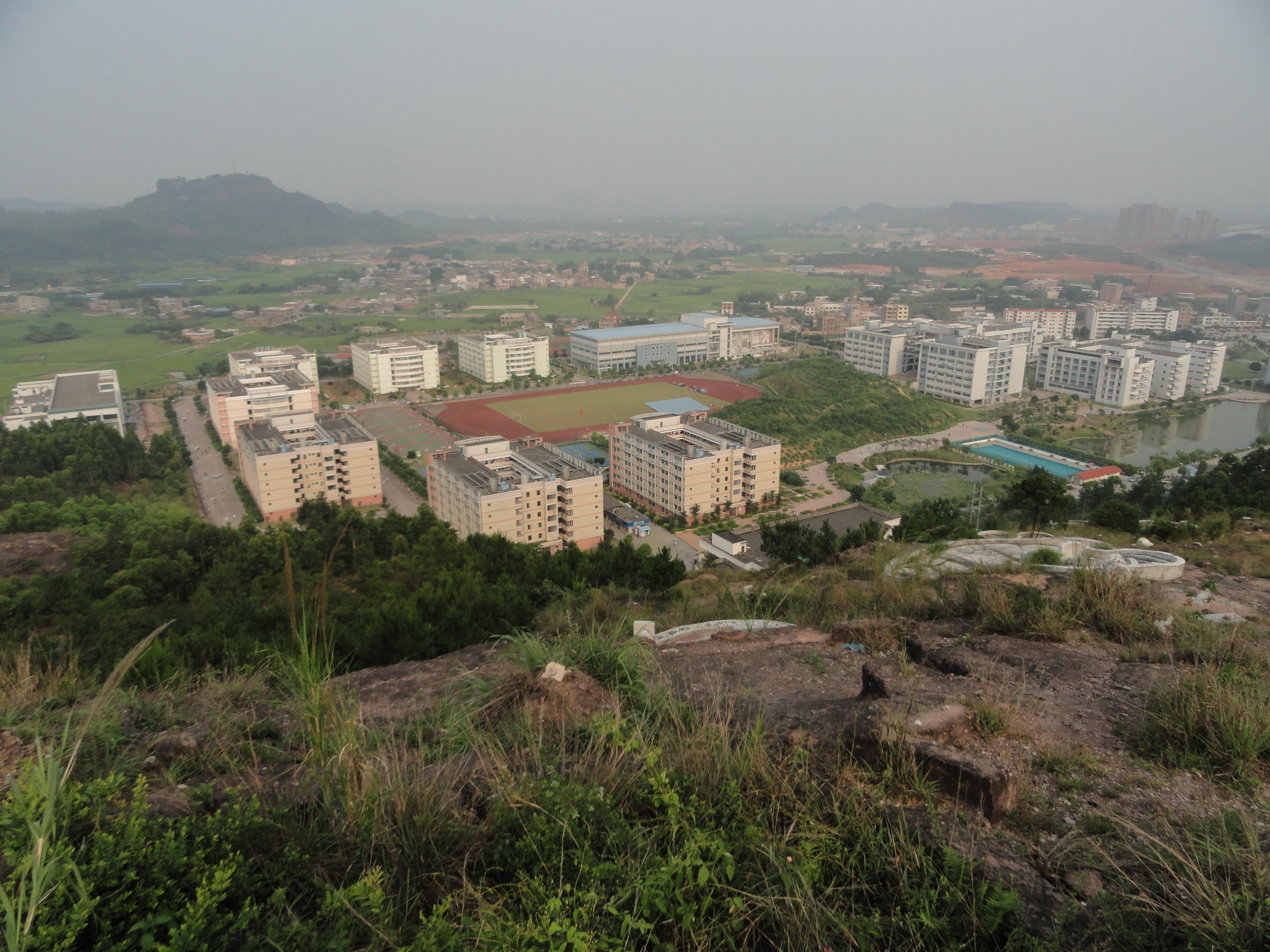
- Yulin Normal University, East Campus
- Type: Public
- Established: 1945; 81 years ago
- Students: 17,200
- Undergraduates: 12,000
- Postgraduates: 5,200
- Location: Yulin, Guangxi, China
- Website: www.ylu.edu.cn

Yulin Normal University (Chinese: 玉林师范学院; pinyin: Yùlín shīfàn xuéyuàn) is a four-year, undergraduate and multidisciplinary university in Yulin, Guangxi, China.

== History ==
Yulin Normal University began as Guangxi Yulin Normal School in 1945. In August 1958, the Guangxi Zhuang Autonomous Region's Department of Education recognized the school and upgraded it to Yulin Teachers College. In 1962 the school went through restructuring, and was resumed on December 28, 1978, by the State Council.

In March 2000, the Ministry of Education approved the merger of Yulin Teachers College with several other local colleges, creating Yulin Normal University.

== Size ==
The university has two campuses. Enrollment is currently about 17,200, including about 12,000 full-time students and 5,200 higher education students. At present, the university has a staff of about 1000 people. The school has 13 departments that include 48 majors.

== Facilities ==
The two campuses include a computer center, linguistic center, library, diet center, supermarket, bank, post office as well as multi-media classrooms.

== Athletics ==
Indoor athletic facilities include two gymnasiums for basketball and volleyball.

Outdoor facilities include two 400m tracks, three soccer fields, a swimming pool, multiple basketball courts, as well as tennis and badminton courts.

== Departments ==
Departments include Chinese Language and Literature, Law and Policy, Foreign Language, Science Education, Physical Education, Arts Department, Mathematics, Computer Science, Physics, Information Technology, Chemistry, Biology, and Polytechnics.

== International exchange ==
Yulin Normal University has joint undergraduate programs with universities in Vietnam, and Thailand. It has employed foreign teachers from Great Britain, the United States, Australia, Japan, Sweden, South Korea, and Malaysia.
