= Wang Li (linguist) =

Chinese linguist (1900–1986)

- 王力
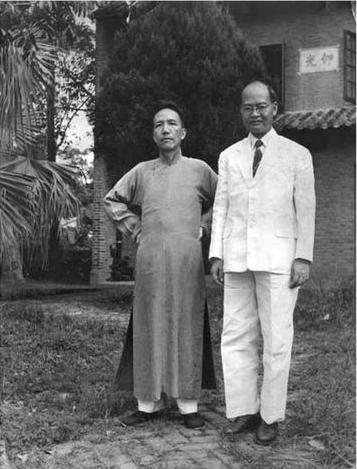
- Professor Wang Li and Chen Yinke in front of Chen’s house at Lingnan University in 1947
- Born: Wang Xiangying 王祥瑛; 10 August 1900; Bobai, Guangxi, China
- Died: 3 May 1986 (aged 85); Beijing, China
- Other name: Liaoyi (了一)
- Occupations: Linguist, translator
- Spouse: Xia Weixia (夏蔚霞)

Academic background
- Education: Tsinghua University, University of Paris
- Influences: Yuen Ren Chao, Liang Qichao, Wang Guowei

Academic work
- Discipline: Linguistics
- Institutions: Tsinghua University, Sun Yat-sen University, Lingnan University, Peking University

Wang Li (Chinese: 王力; pinyin: Wáng Lì; 10 August 1900 – 3 May 1986), courtesy name Wang Liaoyi (王了一) and birth name Wang Xiangying (王祥瑛), was a Chinese linguist, educator, translator and poet, described as the founder of Chinese linguistics. His work expands a wide range in Chinese linguistics, including phonology, grammar and lexicography, historical linguistics and dialectal studies. He was also the founder of the first Chinese Linguistics Department at Tsinghua University. He brought the western modern linguistic methodologies back to China and strove for the modernization and reformation of Chinese grammar throughout his whole life. His most famous books include Zhongguo Yinyunxue 中国音韵学 (Chinese Phonology), Zhongguo Wenfa Chutan 中国文法初探 (An Exploratory Study of Chinese Grammar), and Wang Li Guhanyu Zidian 王力古汉语字典 (Wang Li's Character Dictionary of Ancient Chinese).

== Early life ==
=== Early education ===
Wang Li was born to a poor family in Bobai County, Guangxi, China. He first discovered his interest in literature and novels at the age of seven, inspired by one of the four Great Classical Chinese novels Romance of the Three Kingdoms. However, after he graduated from primary school at the age of 14, his family could no longer support his education. As a result, Wang started to educate himself by reading a large number of books. At the age of seventeen, Wang Li also began to tutor his little brother Xiangrui while the family stilled struggled under poverty and could not provide the money for Xiangrui to go to primary school. Wang Li's talent as a tutor brought him several other young children from the county to study with him. Gradually, Wang built a private school at his house. Wang did not adopt the general teaching style employed by other private schools at the time, which emphasized memorization of text over comprehension. Instead, Wang provided explicit explanation of each text by thoroughly analyzing the syntactic and semantic components of the texts. At the age of 21, Wang was invited to one of his students' house for dinner. He accidentally found fourteen boxes of books, ranging from history to astronomy to medicine, accompanied by the authors' footnotes and literature reviews of various works. Wang asked the host of the family whether he could borrow them and the host kindly lent them to him. Later in his life, Wang considered the discovery of the fourteen boxes of books one turning point of his life.

In the same year, Wang was hired by a local school to teach primary school students Chinese. Three years later, he was funded by his colleagues and the Principal of the school to further pursue his studies in Shanghai.

=== University ===
In 1924, Wang enrolled at Shanghai Southern University and subsequently at the University of China. Two years later, he was admitted to the Academy of Chinese Learning at Tsinghua University, where he studied with Yuen Ren Chao, Liang Qichao and Wang Guowei, whose instruction and guidance immensely inspired and influenced Wang in the study of linguistics. Among the thirty-two students that entered Tsinghua University in the same year as Wang, he was the only one that chose to study linguistics with Chao. Wang said that "While Liang encourages innovation, Chao emphasizes practicality, both of which are indispensable to the study of linguistics". Wang wrote in the postscript of his paper on the topic of the grammar of Classical Chinese that two specific sentence structures Fanzhao Sentence (反照句) and Gangmu Sentence (纲目句) are only commonly observed in Chinese and are very rare in western linguistics. Fanzhao Sentence (反照句) occurs when an object or objective phrase is placed at the beginning of the sentence and is replaced by a pronoun later in the sentence. Gangmu Sentence (纲目句) is similar to modern English topicalization. After reading the paper, Chao suggested that Wang delete the postscript, claiming that he could not assert the grammatical rules of a language before fully acquiring it. Afterwards, Chao's words "It is easier to claim the presence but harder to claim the absence of things" became the motto of Wang's academic career throughout his whole life.

In 1926, under the advice of Chao, Wang went to Paris to further pursue his study of linguistics. He hoped to learn from the western linguistic theories and bring them back to China. Wang supplemented his education by translating French literature into Chinese, and his works were greatly recognized and praised by the editor of the Commercial Press, Ye Shengtao. Ye spoke highly of Wang's translation, commenting that "I cannot comment on faithfulness (to the original work) and expressiveness, but there is no doubt that his translation is filled with elegance and taste."

=== Early career ===
Five years later, Wang finished his education in France with a doctorate degree in the study of Bobai phonology. He first focused on dialects in Liangguang region, which includes Guangdong and Guangxi in Southern China. Based on his observation and intuition as a first language speaker of the Bobai dialect, Wang presumed that cuōkǒu (撮口, "round mouth"), one of the four traditional ways of classifying syllable finals of Mandarin dialects, does not exist in Liangguang area, as it does not exist in the Bobai dialect. However, Chao pointed out in his letters to Wang that it was wrong for him to overgeneralize the dialectal patterns in a large area with multiple dialects solely based on the linguistic behaviors of one single dialect. Taking Chao's advice, Wang narrowed his research down to the study of the dialect in Bobai county.

Afterwards, Wang went back to China in 1931 and started teaching at Tsinghua University in Beijing, ranked among the top three academic institutions in China. In his spare time, he produced various works of literature including books about Greek and Roman literature and translations of Émile Zola's Nana, Molière's plays and Baudelaire's Les Fleurs du mal. While Wang taught General Linguistics and Chinese Phonology for two years at Tsinghua University, his several dozen translations of various works became one of the reasons why he was not offered the expected professorship after two years' teaching. In order to compensate for the unbalanced attention he gave to his job at the university, Wang immersed himself in the study of linguistics and wrote An Exploratory Study of Chinese Grammar (中国文法学初探), which earned him the professorship after four years' lecturing at Tsinghua University. In the book, Wang underlines the importance of using the comparative methodologies used in historical linguistics to compare the feature of Chinese and western languages, to build an independent system of Chinese grammar. He considered this work as a "manifesto" that directed his later works and research in Chinese linguistics.

=== Second Sino-Japanese War ===
During the Second Sino-Japanese War (1937–1945), Wang supported himself through a great number of publications, including newspaper columns and essays on a variety of subjects and genres. The hardship of the war did not stop his research in linguistics. By the end of the war, Wang's research had expanded to phonology, morphology, syntax, poetry and dialectal studies, and he began to plan for the future of Chinese linguistics. He said, "as the language of Chinese starts to prosper, Chinese may appear as one of the foreign languages, parallel to English, French, German and Italian in universities across the world. By the time it happens, is there a Chinese dictionary as good as the Oxford Dictionary, or a formal Chinese grammar system as advanced as the Essentials of English Grammar of Jespersen?"

During the war, Wang also wrote a book called 龙虫并雕斋琐语 (Trivial Talk of Dragon and Worm Carving), a collection of prose and essays he wrote in Kunming, Southern China. In traditional Chinese craftwork, the technique of carving the worm is elementary and uncomplicated, while carving of the dragon requires meticulousness and precision. Wang metaphorically used the phrase "carve the worm" to refer to the stories he wrote about common life, including personal anecdotes and his ruminations, parallel to his other eminent and well-known "carve the dragon" works. This collection of essays is less academically rigid but profound and reflective, which deeply influenced the people during the hardship of wartime. Wang's anecdotes and essays were once criticized by Wen Yiduo, a famous Chinese poet, for their vulgarity and bad taste, which in Wang's opinion were a genuine reflection of people's lives. In one of Wang's essays, Salaries, he pointed out that the word salaries "薪(firewood)水(water)" originally refers to money to buy firewood and water—money needed for sustenance. However, Wang derided the miserly pay for labor from the Chinese government by saying that with salaries being so low, 薪水 should be renamed 茶(tea)水(water) or 风(wind)水(water), as the only thing people could buy with the scarce amount of money was tea or wind. Such stories resonated with those who suffered during wartime and those who worked and lived at the bottom of society.

== Later life ==
=== Later career ===
After the war, Wang started to teach at Sun Yat-sen University in Guangdong in 1946 and founded the first Linguistics Department among Chinese universities. Wang himself designed the course syllabi and content for most of the courses. He integrated his research into teaching and used his own research as teaching materials. He believed that "students should not be taught through books bought by the teacher but through books written by the teacher". Many of his research works and notes were used as the textbooks and were directly sent to be published right after the courses ended.

As the aftermath of the war drifted away, the Chinese government began to switch its prioritization from war efforts into developing literacy rates, implemented through a series of policy in language reform. By the time the State Commission on Language Reform was founded (1954), the number of students in the Linguistics Department increased rapidly and the department was merged into the Chinese Department at Peking University in Beijing, China. By then, Wang served as the department chair of the Department of Chinese Language Studies at Peking University, and was also a member of the advisory board of the Chinese Academy of Social Sciences and State Commission on Language Reform. He was actively engaged in the institution and transmission of pinyin (the romanization system of Mandarin Chinese pronunciation) and putonghua (Modern Standard Mandarin). Wang insisted that pinyin should be represented in the form of Latin alphabet, and Pinyin should be taught to students in the first year of school.

While Wang was devoted to promoting the transmission and advancement of the language of Chinese and its application, he continued his research in morphology, semantics, rhetoric, lexicography and experimental phonology, and the inheritance of traditional Chinese linguistics. Wang then started the study of Classical Chinese, believing that "in order to catch up with the world's advanced study in the science of language, one has to perform historical analysis on the linguistic phenomena and its development patterns." Per request of the Ministry of Education of China's objective of rehabilitating college students' abilities to read Classical Chinese and promoting the transmission of traditional Chinese literature, Wang took the responsibility and started to compile the four-volume textbook 古代漢語 Ancient Chinese. He included selections of classical Chinese literature with detailed annotation, lessons on background knowledge, and a glossary of commonly used words, combining theory and practical usage as the method of instruction. This textbook, printed in Traditional Chinese, is still used by Chinese language and literature students at Peking University and other major language and literature departments in China. The glossary served as the starting point of the 古汉语常用字字典 Dictionary of Commonly Used Characters in Ancient Chinese. With Wang as the original editor-in-chief, this dictionary has proven to be extremely popular, having undergone over 100 printings since its initial publication in 1980 (most recent revision, 5th ed. in 2018) and is by far the most widely used (and often required) reference work for Classical Chinese for secondary school students. As such, it is set in Simplified Chinese for accessibility by a general audience, although there are extensive usage notes to help readers distinguish between ancient variant forms, tongjia 'rebus borrowing' characters, and modern simplified forms.

In 1957, Wang finished writing the book Hanyu Shigao 漢語史稿 A Draft History of the Chinese Language. The three volumes of the book respectively demonstrates the historical development of Chinese phonology, grammar and lexicon, and illustrates the progress of transformation from classical Chinese to modern Chinese.

=== Later years ===
Wang's academic career was severely hindered during the Cultural Revolution (1966–1976). He was publicly humiliated and was sentenced to hard labour from 1966 to 1971, experiencing enormous devastation and depression. Wang had earlier made an agreement with Commercial Press to write a dictionary of ancient Chinese. He began to work on it, but after completing fifty-odd pages, the manuscript was confiscated and destroyed when Red Guards raided his home. He only restarted the work when the Zhonghua Publishing House invited him to compile a dictionary in the early 1980s (see below). While he was under suppression and imprisonment, he continued his study. During daytime at labour, he reflected and expanded on the texts and materials he memorized and wrote down his thoughts at night. When the Cultural Revolution ended, Wang Li had finished writing two books on classical Chinese poetry, the Classic of Poetry and Chu Ci.

After the Cultural Revolution ended in 1976, Wang was determined to work harder to compensate for the six years he had lost due to the political upheaval. He was invited to give lectures at different universities and conferences, and responded to letters of inquiry of different areas including writing, Pinyin learning and foreign language acquisition. Wang put together a large amount of his works into books, including The General Principles of Ancient Chinese, The History of Chinese Phonology, and The Dictionary of Paronyms. He also started to revise the A Draft History of the Chinese Language at the age of 80, and expanded his original work A Draft History of the Chinese Language into History of Chinese Phonology, History of Chinese Syntax and History of Chinese Lexicography.

In 1984, at the age of 84, he started to compile a dictionary for ancient Chinese, writing thousands of characters everyday, regardless of his deteriorated vision and other health conditions. In order to minimize the cataract's hindrance, he bought many magnifiers, switching from one to the other so that he could continue reading and writing, until he was no longer able to work. In the postscript of the work, the dictionary's editorial team writes that Wang had worked on the dictionary seven to eight hours per day in the last few years of his life, completing a preface and a little more than four out of the twelve sections of the work. Wang died at the age of 86 from complications of cerebrovascular disease. Although he was not able to finish writing the dictionary, six of his students and colleagues collaborated and finished the work with his advice and instructions, and named it The Wang Li Character Dictionary of Ancient Chinese, in his memory with the permission of his widow Xia Weixia (夏蔚霞).

The editorial team completed the dictionary in 1998 (publishing it in 2000) in the spirit of Wang's ideal ancient Chinese dictionary, which he outlined in the dictionary's preface and previously in an essay written in the 1940s entitled "An Ideal Dictionary" (理想的字典). In general, the work is informed by and incorporates the principles of Western historical linguistics, something that Wang felt was missing in previous dictionaries that descended more-or-less directly from China's native philological traditions. In the preface, Wang criticized some incorrect interpretations of citations in previously published dictionaries like the Cihai or Ciyuan for definitions incompatible with the historical evolution of a character's meaning. In addition to giving the original Classical and pre-Classical definitions of a character, it also provides Old Chinese rime group and Middle Chinese fanqie, and gives collections of characters of common etymological origin, often, but not necessarily, derived from the same graphic element (e.g., 才，財，材 and 家，嫁，居). It also carefully notes definitions that arose post-Classically during the medieval and late imperial periods, and alerts readers to possibly unreliable definitions appearing only once in historical texts (see hapax legomenon). The work (published only in Traditional Chinese) was immediately recognized as an authoritative reference for scholars engaged in linguistic or historical research and was awarded first prize in the fourth National Lexicographical Works Prize.

== Legacy ==
In 1990, three years after Wang died, the Wang Li Academic Forum was held in Beijing. Scholars and linguists from different countries came and paid respect to the great linguist Wang Li. In the same year, the book Wang Li Xian Sheng Ji Nian Lun Wen 王力先生纪念论文 (Festschrift of Wang Li) was published.

=== Criticism ===
Wang pointed out in his book Zhong Guo Yu Yan Xue Shi 中国语言学史 (History of Chinese Linguistics) that in the past, Chinese scholars mistakenly regarded philology as linguistics and overly emphasized exploring the literature instead of the language itself. He decisively claimed that there is a difference between philology and linguistics: while the former relies on the investigation of earlier literature and a language's historical development, the latter studies the language itself and generates systematic and scientific linguistic theories. Wang's distinction of philology and linguistics was questioned by many scholars; Xu Guozhang, a famous Chinese linguist specializing in English especially disagreed with Wang and claimed that a developed linguistic system did exist in traditional Chinese literature, such as the liu shu 六書 ('six scripts'), a system for classifying and structurally analyzing the origin and development of Hanzi, the Chinese characters.

=== Major publications ===
- Hanyu Shigao 漢語史稿 A Draft History of the Chinese Language [3 vols.] (1957; 1980, revised ed., 1996 one-volume reprint)
- Hanyu Shilüxue 漢語詩律學 A Study of the Metrical Rules of Chinese Poetry (1958)
- Gudai Hanyu 古代漢語 Ancient Chinese [4 vols.] (1962, editor-in-chief; 1999, 3rd ed. with Guo Xiliang as editor-in-chief)
- Guhanyu Changyongzi Zidian 古汉语常用字字典 A Dictionary of Commonly Used Characters in Ancient Chinese (1980, leader of Compilation Group; 2018, 5th ed. in Simplified Chinese) (2017, 4th ed. in Traditional Chinese)
- Tongyuan Zidian 同源字典 A Dictionary of Word Families (1982)
- Wang Li Guhanyu Zidian 王力古漢語字典 The Wang Li Character Dictionary of Ancient Chinese (2000, originator and leader of Compilation Group; completed posthumously by students and colleagues)
