= Yulin–Tieshangang railway =

Railway line in China

Overview
- Status: Operational
- Termini: Yulin; Bobai (passengers) Tieshangang (freight)

Service
- Type: Heavy rail

History
- Opened: 27 September 2020

Technical
- Line length: 131.7 km (82 mi)
- Track gauge: 1,435 mm (4 ft 8 1/2 in) standard gauge
- Electrification: 50 Hz 25,000 V
- Operating speed: 160 km/h (99 mph)

The Yulin–Tieshangang railway (Chinese: 玉铁铁路) is a single-track electrified railway in China. The combined passenger and freight line is 131.7 kilometres (81.8 mi) long and has a design speed of 160 kilometres per hour (99 mph).

== History ==
Construction began in September 2010. Tracklaying began on 20 September 2012. It began operation on 6 May 2015.

On 1 April 2016, a passenger service was introduced between Yulin railway station and Bobai railway station.
