= Yuzhou District =

Yuzhou 玉州区 · Yicouh Gih
- District
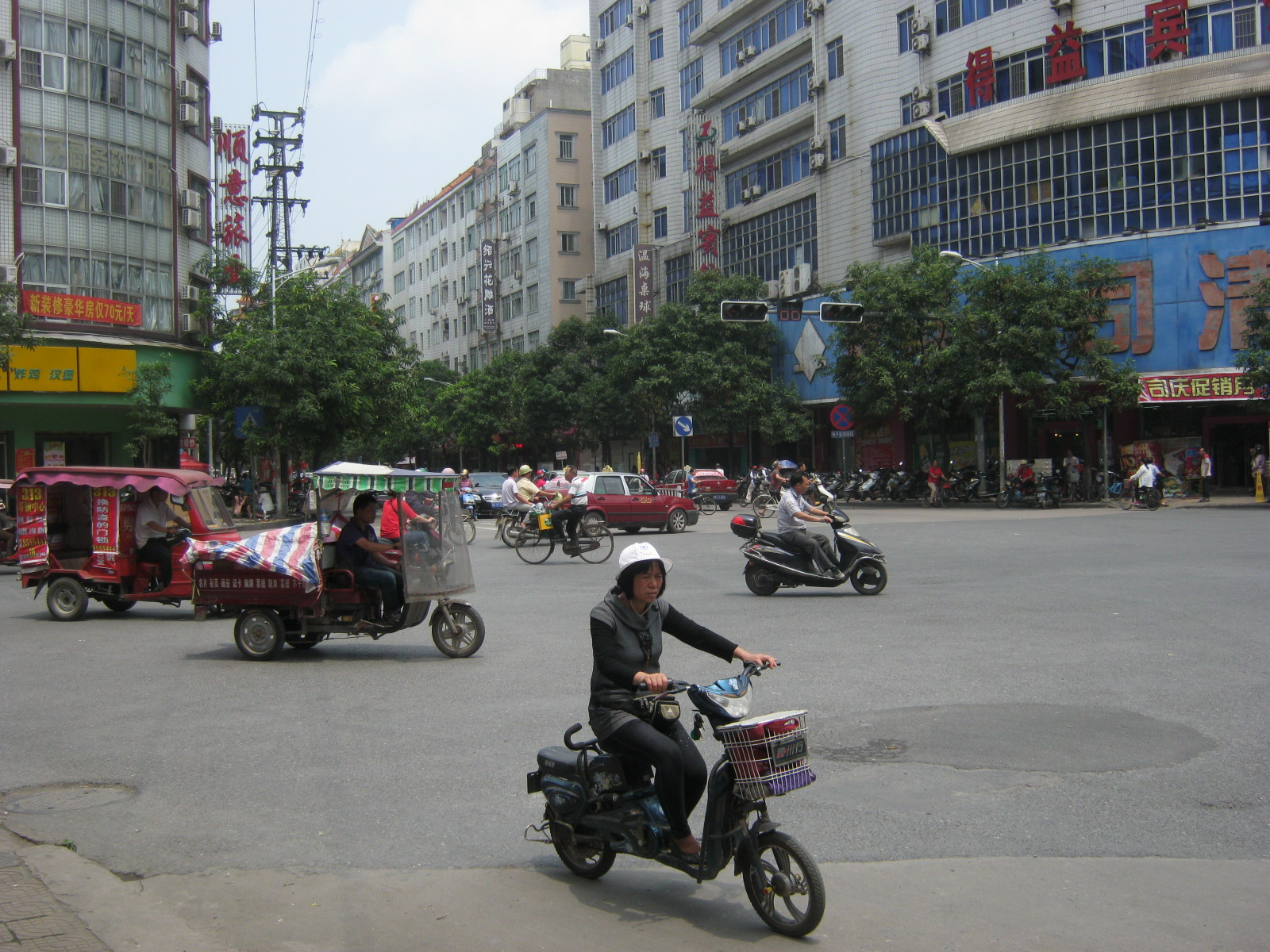

- Location in Guangxi
- Coordinates: 22°37′41″N 110°09′04″E
- Country: China
- Autonomous region: Guangxi
- Prefecture-level city: Yulin
- Township-level divisions: 5 subdistricts 4 towns
- District seat: Yucheng Subdistrict

Area
  - Total: 435.54 km^{2} (168.16 sq mi)
- Elevation: 80 m (260 ft)

Population (2020 census)
  - Total: 908,121
  - Density: 2,085.0/km^{2} (5,400.2/sq mi)
- Time zone: UTC+8 (China Standard)
- Website: www.ylyz.gov.cn

Yuzhou (Chinese: 玉州; pinyin: Yùzhōu) is a district and the seat of the city of Yulin, in the Guangxi Zhuang Autonomous Region, China, and, as its only district, is synonymous with Yulin's urban area.

== Administrative divisions ==
Yuzhou District is divided into 5 subdistricts and 4 towns:

Subdistricts:

- Yucheng Subdistrict (玉城街道), Nanjiang Subdistrict (南江街道), Chengxi Subdistrict (城西街道), Chengbei Subdistrict (城北街道), Mingshan Subdistrict (名山街道)

Towns:

- Datang (大塘镇), Maolin (茂林镇), Rendong (仁东镇), Renhou (仁厚镇)
