= Rong County, Guangxi =

Rong County 容县 Jung County
- County
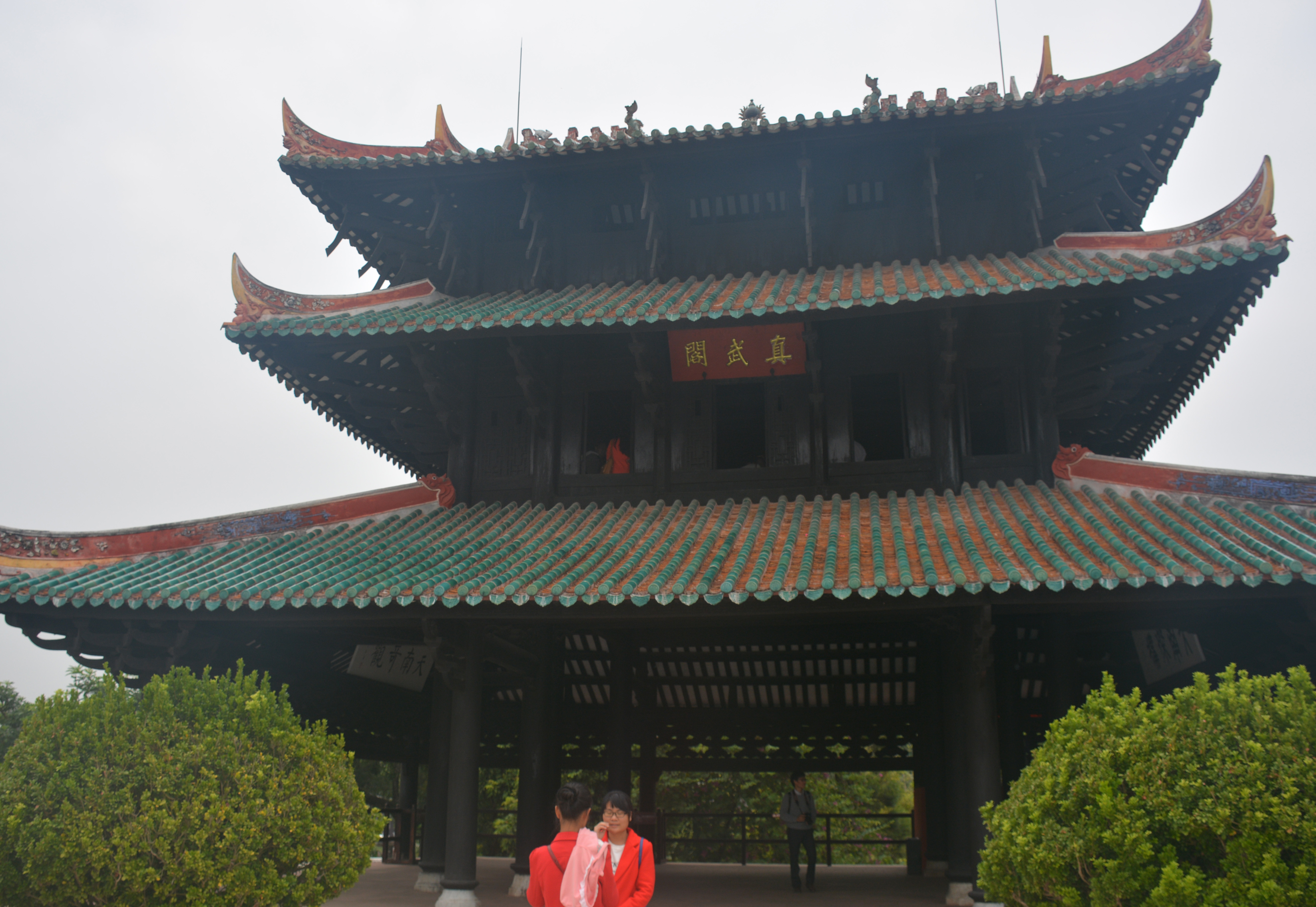

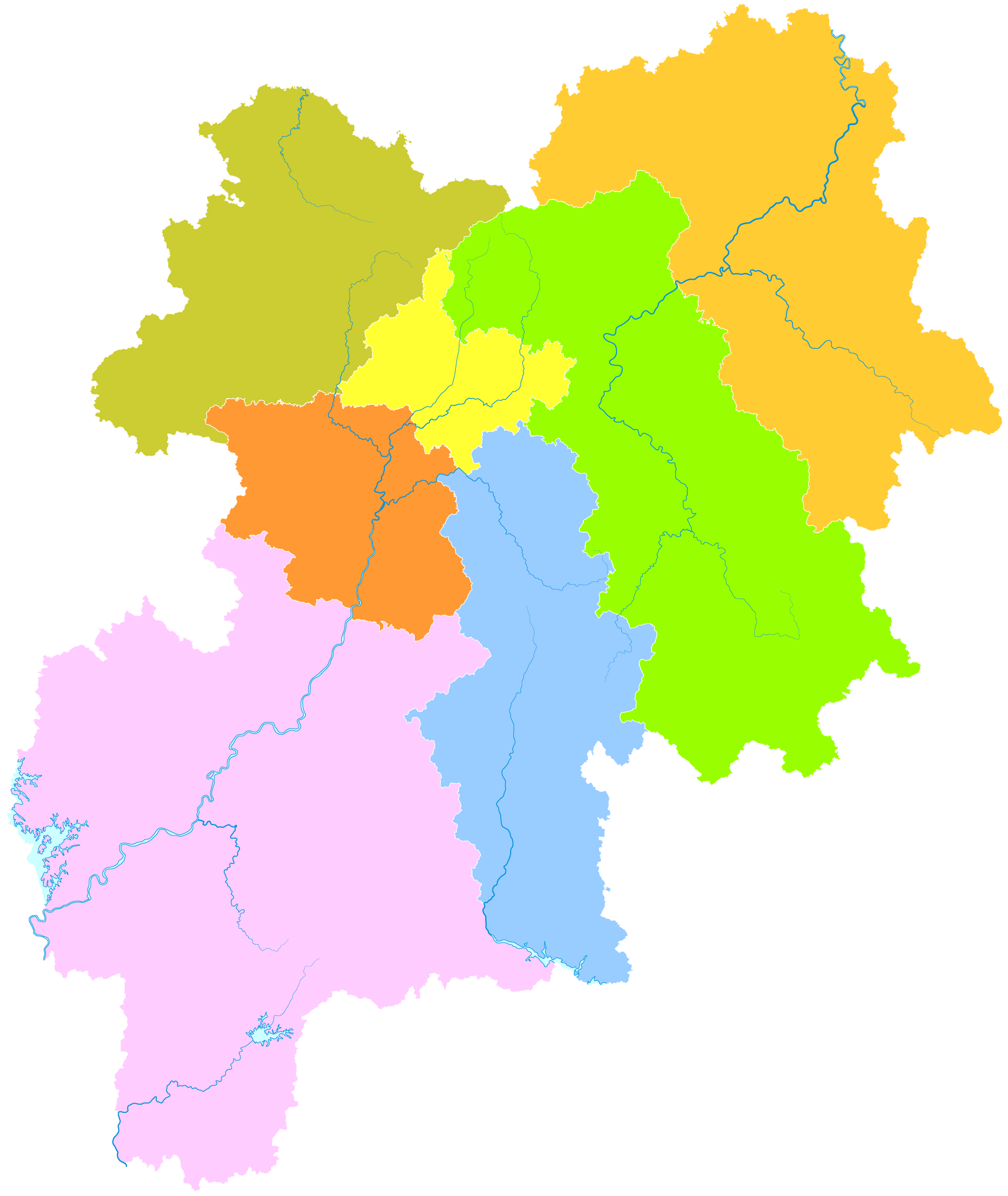
- Rong County is the northeasternmost division on this map of Yulin.

- Yulin in Guangxi
- Coordinates: 22°51′32″N 110°33′29″E
- Country: China
- Autonomous region: Guangxi
- Prefecture-level city: Yulin
- County seat: Rongzhou

Area
  - Total: 2,257.39 km^{2} (871.58 sq mi)

Population (2020)
  - Total: 654,916
  - Density: 290.121/km^{2} (751.410/sq mi)
- Time zone: UTC+8 (China Standard)

Rongxian
- Traditional Chinese: 容縣
- Simplified Chinese: 容县
- Postal: Junghsien
Transcriptions
Standard Mandarin
- Hanyu Pinyin: Róngxìan
- Wade–Giles: Jung^{2}-hsien^{4}

Rongxian (Chinese: 容县; also called Rong Xian or Rong County) is a county in the southeast of Guangxi, China, bordering Guangdong province to the southeast. It occupies the northeast corner of the prefecture-level city of Yulin. Its population is approximately 700,000.

Duqiao Mountain (都峤山), located in Rongxian, is a famous Taoist sanctuary. Other tourist sites include the Zhenwu Pavilion (真武阁).

== Administrative divisions ==
Rong County is divided into 15 towns:

- Rongzhou 容州镇
- Yangmei 杨梅镇
- Lingshan 灵山镇
- Liuwang 六王镇
- Licun 黎村镇
- Yangcun 杨村镇
- Xiandi 县底镇
- Ziliang 自良镇
- Songshan 松山镇
- Luojiang 罗江镇
- Shitou 石头镇
- Shizhai 石寨镇
- Shili 十里镇
- Rongxi 容西镇
- Langshui 浪水镇

== Transport ==
- Luoyang–Zhanjiang Railway

== Climate ==
Climate data for Rongxian, elevation 132 m (433 ft), (1991–2020 normals, extremes 1981–2010)
Month	Jan	Feb	Mar	Apr	May	Jun	Jul	Aug	Sep	Oct	Nov	Dec	Year
Record high °C (°F)	29.2 (84.6)	32.5 (90.5)	34.1 (93.4)	35.2 (95.4)	35.1 (95.2)	37.1 (98.8)	38.3 (100.9)	37.9 (100.2)	37.7 (99.9)	35.0 (95.0)	33.0 (91.4)	30.1 (86.2)	38.3 (100.9)
Mean daily maximum °C (°F)	17.3 (63.1)	19.1 (66.4)	21.7 (71.1)	26.5 (79.7)	30.2 (86.4)	31.9 (89.4)	32.9 (91.2)	32.9 (91.2)	31.5 (88.7)	28.7 (83.7)	24.6 (76.3)	19.4 (66.9)	26.4 (79.5)
Daily mean °C (°F)	12.8 (55.0)	14.8 (58.6)	17.7 (63.9)	22.4 (72.3)	25.7 (78.3)	27.3 (81.1)	28.0 (82.4)	27.8 (82.0)	26.5 (79.7)	23.6 (74.5)	19.2 (66.6)	14.5 (58.1)	21.7 (71.0)
Mean daily minimum °C (°F)	9.8 (49.6)	11.9 (53.4)	15.0 (59.0)	19.5 (67.1)	22.7 (72.9)	24.5 (76.1)	24.9 (76.8)	24.7 (76.5)	23.2 (73.8)	19.9 (67.8)	15.6 (60.1)	11.0 (51.8)	18.6 (65.4)
Record low °C (°F)	0.9 (33.6)	1.2 (34.2)	2.8 (37.0)	8.0 (46.4)	12.7 (54.9)	17.7 (63.9)	19.9 (67.8)	20.9 (69.6)	15.0 (59.0)	9.7 (49.5)	4.1 (39.4)	0.0 (32.0)	0.0 (32.0)
Average precipitation mm (inches)	64.5 (2.54)	49.6 (1.95)	90.4 (3.56)	159.6 (6.28)	276.4 (10.88)	283.8 (11.17)	218.7 (8.61)	223.0 (8.78)	135.5 (5.33)	64.5 (2.54)	57.1 (2.25)	43.3 (1.70)	1,666.4 (65.59)
Average precipitation days (≥ 0.1 mm)	10.7	11.3	16.0	15.6	18.9	20.8	18.7	17.6	12.2	5.7	7.0	7.3	161.8
Average relative humidity (%)	76	79	83	82	82	83	81	82	79	73	72	71	79
Mean monthly sunshine hours	92.6	76.3	60.4	92.2	140.4	148.4	196.8	198.6	190.1	198.7	163.3	137.2	1,695
Percentage possible sunshine	27	24	16	24	34	37	48	50	52	56	50	41	38
Source: China Meteorological Administration

== Notable persons ==
- Ramadan ibn Alauddin, a Muslim from Korea who governed Rong County in the 1340s
