= Yuejiang Tower =

Tower in Nanjing, Jiangsu province, China

Coordinates: 32°05′46.64″N 118°44′28.17″E

Map

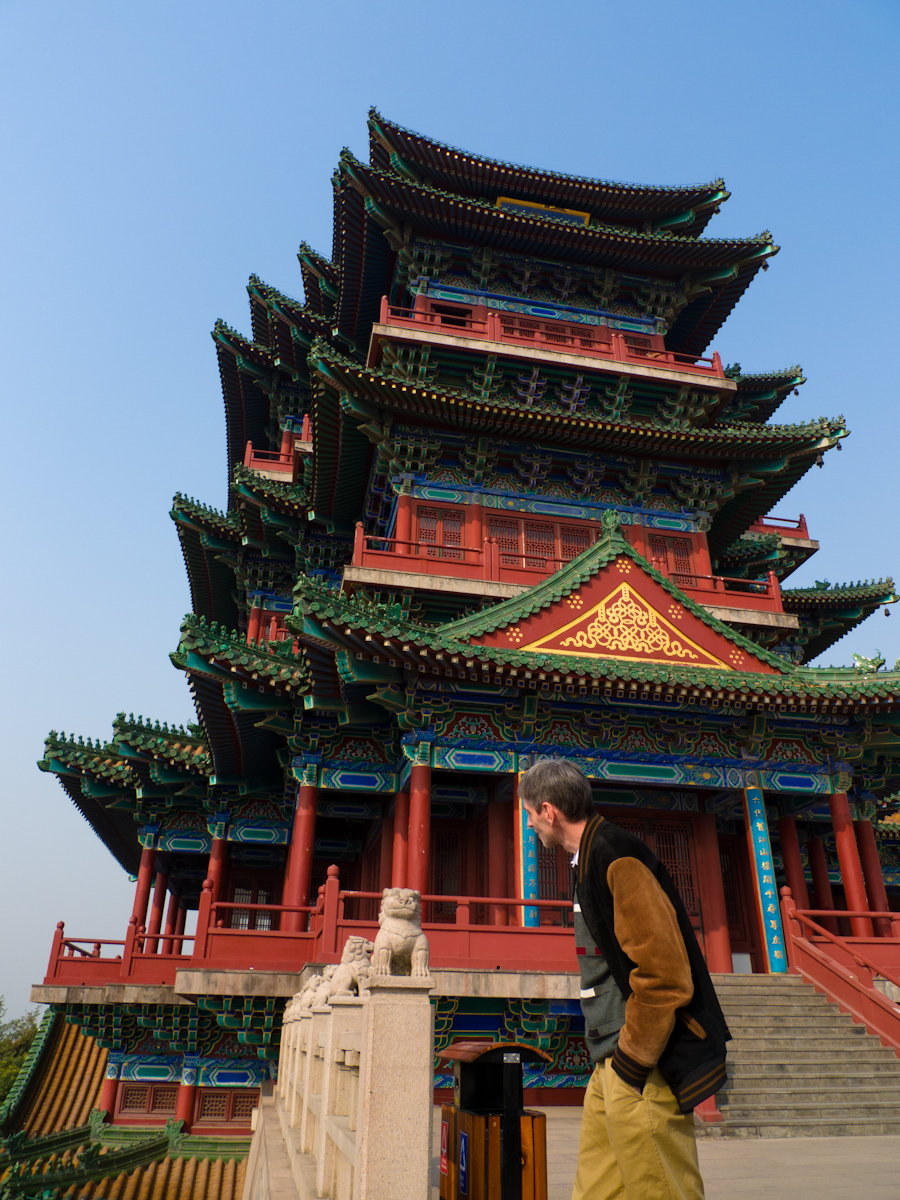

Yuejiang Tower (simplified Chinese: 阅江楼; traditional Chinese: 閱江樓; pinyin: Yuèjiāng Lóu; lit. 'view river tower') is situated on the top of Shizishan (Lion Mountain) to the northwest of downtown Nanjing, Jiangsu. The river referred to in its name is the Yangtze River, which may be viewed to the north, while central Nanjing can be viewed to the south.

In 1360, Zhu Yuanzhang defeated Chen Youliang's force of 400,000 with his army of 80,000 in Lu Longshan, which became the basis for the reign of Ming Dynasty and for taking Nanjing as the capital. After proclaiming himself as the emperor, Zhu Yuanzhang changed the name of Lu Longshan to "Lion Mountain" in 1374. He ordered the Yuejiang Tower built atop the mountain and wrote the Note on Yuejiang Tower in person, although the tower was never built.

Yuejiang Tower was completed and opened to the outside world in 2001. The building is 52 m (171 ft) high, amounted to seven layers. With its distinct Ming Dynasty style and classical royal markings, it is regarded as one of the Four Major Famous Buildings in Jiangnan along with Yellow Crane Tower, Tengwang Pavilion and Yueyang Tower.

The architect is Professor Du Shunbao, a professor of Southeast University.
