= Yulin, Guangxi =

Yulin 玉林市 (Chinese) Yoglinz Si (Zhuang) Watlam
- Prefecture-level city
- Yulin in 2006

- Location of Yulin City jurisdiction in Guangxi
- Coordinates (Yulin municipal government): 22°39′14″N 110°10′52″E
- Country: People's Republic of China
- Autonomous region: Guangxi
- Municipal seat: Yuzhou District

Area
  - Prefecture-level city: 12,828 km^{2} (4,953 sq mi)
  - Urban: 1,237 km^{2} (478 sq mi)
  - Metro: 3,689.4 km^{2} (1,424.5 sq mi)

Population (2020 census)
  - Prefecture-level city: 5,796,766
  - Density: 451.88/km^{2} (1,170.4/sq mi)
  - Urban: 1,226,830
  - Urban density: 991.8/km^{2} (2,569/sq mi)
  - Metro: 2,438,467
  - Metro density: 660.94/km^{2} (1,711.8/sq mi)

GDP
  - Prefecture-level city: CN¥ 207.1 billion US$ 32.1 billion
  - Per capita: CN¥ 35,639; US$ 5,524
- Time zone: UTC+8 (China Standard)
- Postal code: 537000
- Area code: 0775
- ISO 3166 code: CN-GX-09
- Website: yulin.gov.cn

Yulin (Chinese: 玉林; pinyin: Yùlín; lit. 'Jade Forest', 鬱林), alternately romanized as Watlam, is one of the fourteen prefecture-level cities of the Guangxi Zhuang Autonomous Region, People's Republic of China. Its Chinese name was changed in 1956 from the historical name "鬱林" (pinyin: Yùlín; lit. 'Dense Forest'), which is homophonous in Standard Mandarin, but different in the local dialect of Yue Chinese; "鬱" is [uat˥] while "玉" is [ȵok˨]. The former romanization follows the pronunciation of the historical name in Yue Chinese. Its built-up area is made of two urban districts, and Beiliu City was home to 2,438,467 inhabitants as of 2020 census. By the end of 2024, the city's resident population is 5,804,200, including 3,051,10 million in urban areas.

== Geography and climate ==
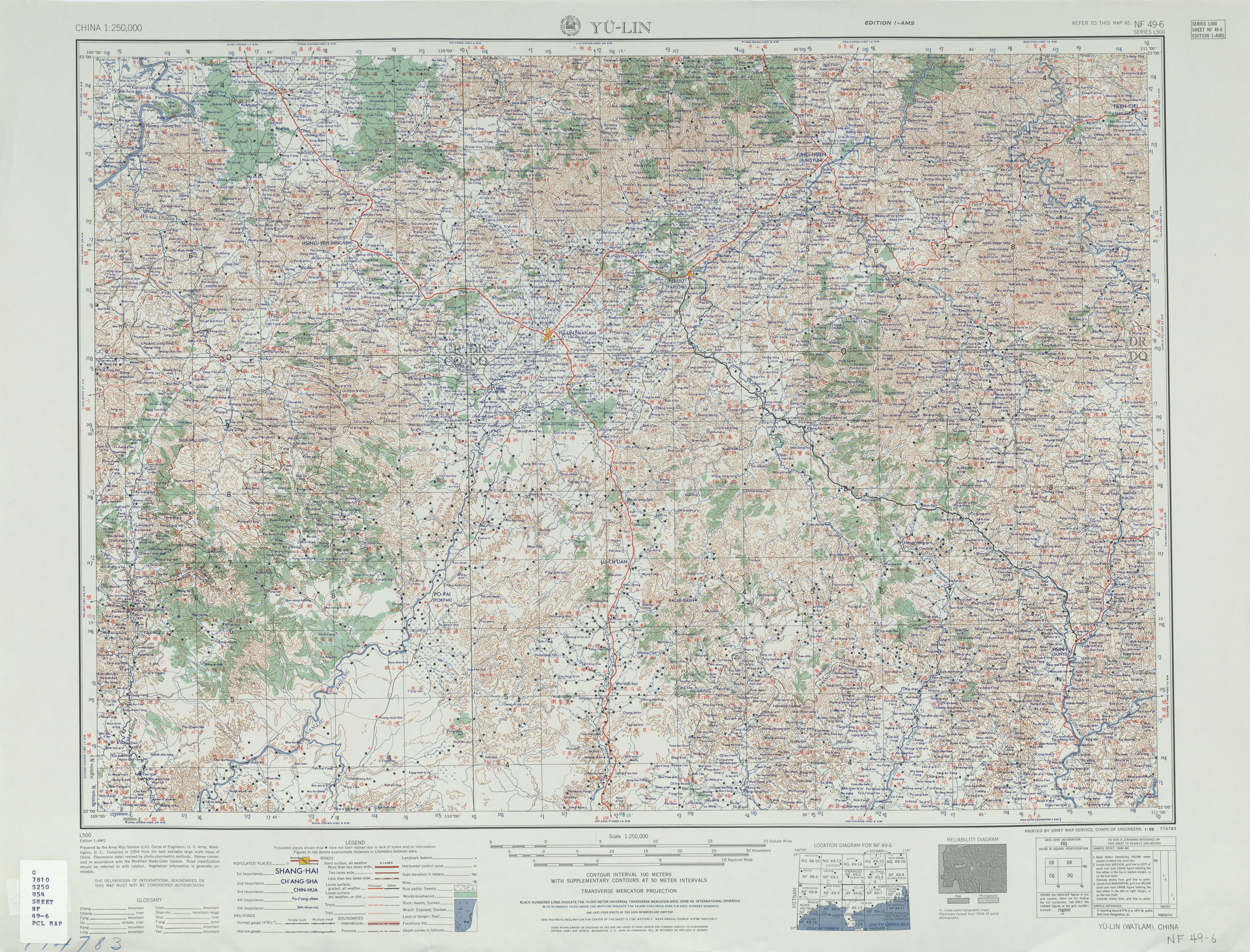
Map including Yulin (labeled as YÜ-LIN (WATLAM) 鬱林) (AMS, 1954)

Yulin is located in southeastern Guangxi province along the border with Guangdong. It is a hilly basin with a total area of 12,838 km^{2} (4,957 sq mi).

Yulin's climate is subtropical and monsoonal. Average annual temperatures is 22.9 °C. Yearly precipitation is 1,577 mm.

Climate data for Yulin, elevation 122 m (400 ft), (1991–2020 normals, extremes 1955–present)
Month	Jan	Feb	Mar	Apr	May	Jun	Jul	Aug	Sep	Oct	Nov	Dec	Year
Record high °C (°F)	28.7 (83.7)	32.2 (90.0)	33.2 (91.8)	34.9 (94.8)	36.6 (97.9)	37.5 (99.5)	38.2 (100.8)	37.9 (100.2)	36.4 (97.5)	36.1 (97.0)	32.7 (90.9)	29.7 (85.5)	38.2 (100.8)
Mean daily maximum °C (°F)	17.8 (64.0)	19.6 (67.3)	22.0 (71.6)	26.9 (80.4)	30.7 (87.3)	32.3 (90.1)	33.2 (91.8)	33.1 (91.6)	32.0 (89.6)	29.4 (84.9)	25.4 (77.7)	20.4 (68.7)	26.9 (80.4)
Daily mean °C (°F)	13.6 (56.5)	15.5 (59.9)	18.4 (65.1)	23.1 (73.6)	26.3 (79.3)	27.9 (82.2)	28.5 (83.3)	28.4 (83.1)	27.3 (81.1)	24.3 (75.7)	20.1 (68.2)	15.4 (59.7)	22.4 (72.3)
Mean daily minimum °C (°F)	10.7 (51.3)	12.7 (54.9)	15.7 (60.3)	20.3 (68.5)	23.3 (73.9)	25.1 (77.2)	25.6 (78.1)	25.4 (77.7)	24.0 (75.2)	20.7 (69.3)	16.5 (61.7)	11.9 (53.4)	19.3 (66.8)
Record low °C (°F)	−2.1 (28.2)	1.7 (35.1)	5.7 (42.3)	8.1 (46.6)	15.8 (60.4)	19.8 (67.6)	22.0 (71.6)	21.5 (70.7)	15.3 (59.5)	10.3 (50.5)	6.6 (43.9)	0.8 (33.4)	−2.1 (28.2)
Average precipitation mm (inches)	61.4 (2.42)	46.1 (1.81)	79.6 (3.13)	146.3 (5.76)	235.0 (9.25)	268.2 (10.56)	246.7 (9.71)	186.8 (7.35)	131.0 (5.16)	65.6 (2.58)	56.9 (2.24)	44.2 (1.74)	1,567.8 (61.71)
Average precipitation days (≥ 0.1 mm)	10.4	11.3	16.3	15.3	16.9	18.7	17.9	17.4	11.6	6.5	7.1	7.5	156.9
Average relative humidity (%)	77	80	83	81	81	83	80	80	78	72	72	71	78
Mean monthly sunshine hours	79.3	62.2	47.9	75.0	132.9	140.3	179.0	180.7	176.4	185.9	151.4	126.1	1,537.1
Percentage possible sunshine	23	19	13	20	32	35	43	46	48	52	46	38	35
Source: China Meteorological Administrationall-time record lowall-time October record

== History ==
Artifacts suggest that the area was settled before the Qin dynasty but a commandery by the name of Yulin was not established until early Han dynasty. The urban centre of Yulin became a zhou in 996 AD. Since ancient times, Yulin has been important for trade and communications between central China and the south, especially along the coast of the Tonkin Gulf.

== Administration ==
Yulin has two districts, one city, four counties, and 119 towns and townships.

Districts:

- Yuzhou District (玉州区)
- Fumian District (福绵区)

County-level City:

- Beiliu City (北流市)

Counties:

- Rong County (容县)
- Luchuan County (陆川县)
- Bobai County (博白县)
- Xingye County (兴业县)

Demographics:

- As of the 2020 Chinese census, its total population was 5,796,766 inhabitants and its built-up (or metro) area made of two urban districts and Beiliu City was home to 2,438,467 inhabitants. The majority of Yulin's population is Han but also includes Zhuang, Miao, and other ethnic minorities, totaling more than 100,000 people.

Map
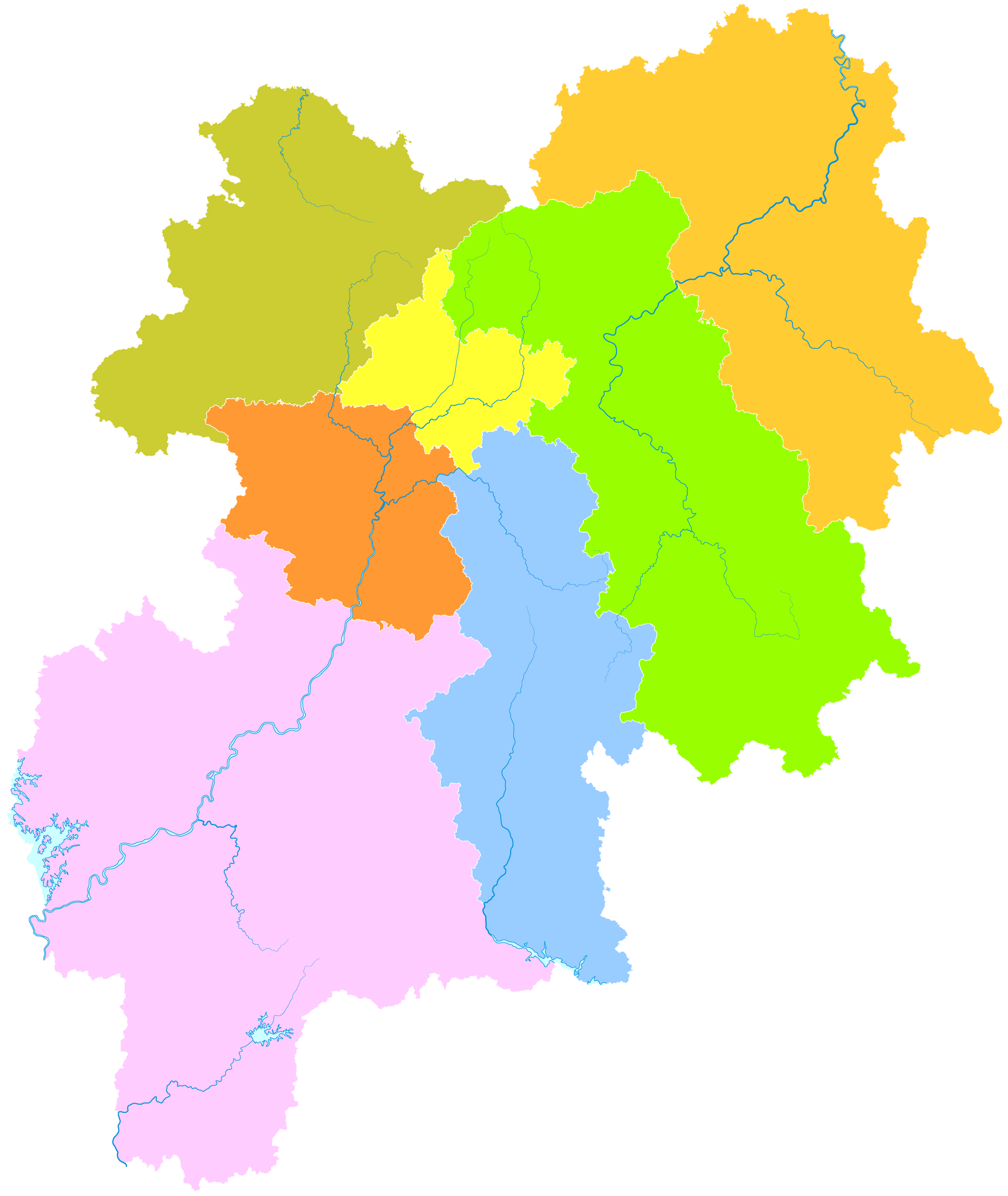

== Dog meat festival ==
Yulin is also well known for its annual dog meat and lychee festival which takes place on 21 June, over the course of 10 days or so. Over 10,000 dogs are slaughtered at this festival for human consumption. The festival also includes consuming cat and lychee. Many of the dogs are stolen pets.

== Economy ==
Yulin is rich in natural resources. Important mineral resources include granite, limestone, iron, and gemstones. It is also Guangxi's biggest source of porcelain clay. Major agricultural products are rice, bananas, tomatoes, mandarin oranges, mangoes, longan, anise, tea, sugarcane, livestock such as cattle, pigs, geese, chickens and dogs. Industrial goods include machinery, construction materials, processed food, chemicals, pharmaceuticals, cigarettes, and ceramics.

== Transportation ==
Yulin is where the G59 Hohhot–Beihai Expressway and G80 Guangzhou–Kunming Expressway intersect, and there are also provincial highways and "not tolled" roads available. (Note: Chinese highways without any divided carriageway are not allowed to have any toll booths)

Yulin is served by Yulin railway station, which sees both high-speed and conventional services. Typical trains take approximately 2 hours to reach Nanning, capital of Guangxi.

Yulin is served by Yulin Fumian Airport, which opened in August 2020.

== Education ==
Yulin is home to Yulin Normal University, where there are 13 departments with 38 four-year undergraduate specialties, 14 three-year specialties, more than 17,200 students including 12,000 full-time students and 5,200 higher education students.

Guangxi Yulin High School is a high-level key middle school in Guangxi Zhuang Autonomous Region and an advanced unit of national spiritual civilization construction. It is also the first demonstration ordinary high school in Guangxi.
