= Qian Lingxi =

Chinese physicist and civil engineer (1916–2009)

Qian Lingxi (Chinese: 钱令希; 26 July 1916 – 20 April 2009), also known as Tsien Ling-hi, was a Chinese civil engineer and physicist. An authority on engineering structural mechanics and computational mechanics, he served as president of the Dalian University of Technology (DUT) and was a founding member of the Chinese Academy of Sciences (CAS). DUT's Lingxi Library, opened in 2009, is named after him.

== Early life and education ==
On 26 July 1916, Qian was born in the town of Hongsheng (鸿声镇, now Hongshan Subdistrict) outside the city of Wuxi in Jiangsu, China. His father, Qian Bogui (钱伯圭), was the teacher of the celebrated historian Qian Mu (Ch'ien Mu), and his older brother Qian Linzhao (1906–1999) was also a distinguished physicist and a founding member of the CAS.

After obtaining his bachelor's degree in civil engineering from Institut Technique Franc-Chinois de Shanghai (now part of the University of Shanghai for Science and Technology) in 1936, he won a Boxer Indemnity Scholarship to study at the Free University of Brussels in Belgium. He received the degree of ingénieur de construction civil avec grande distinction from the university in July 1938.

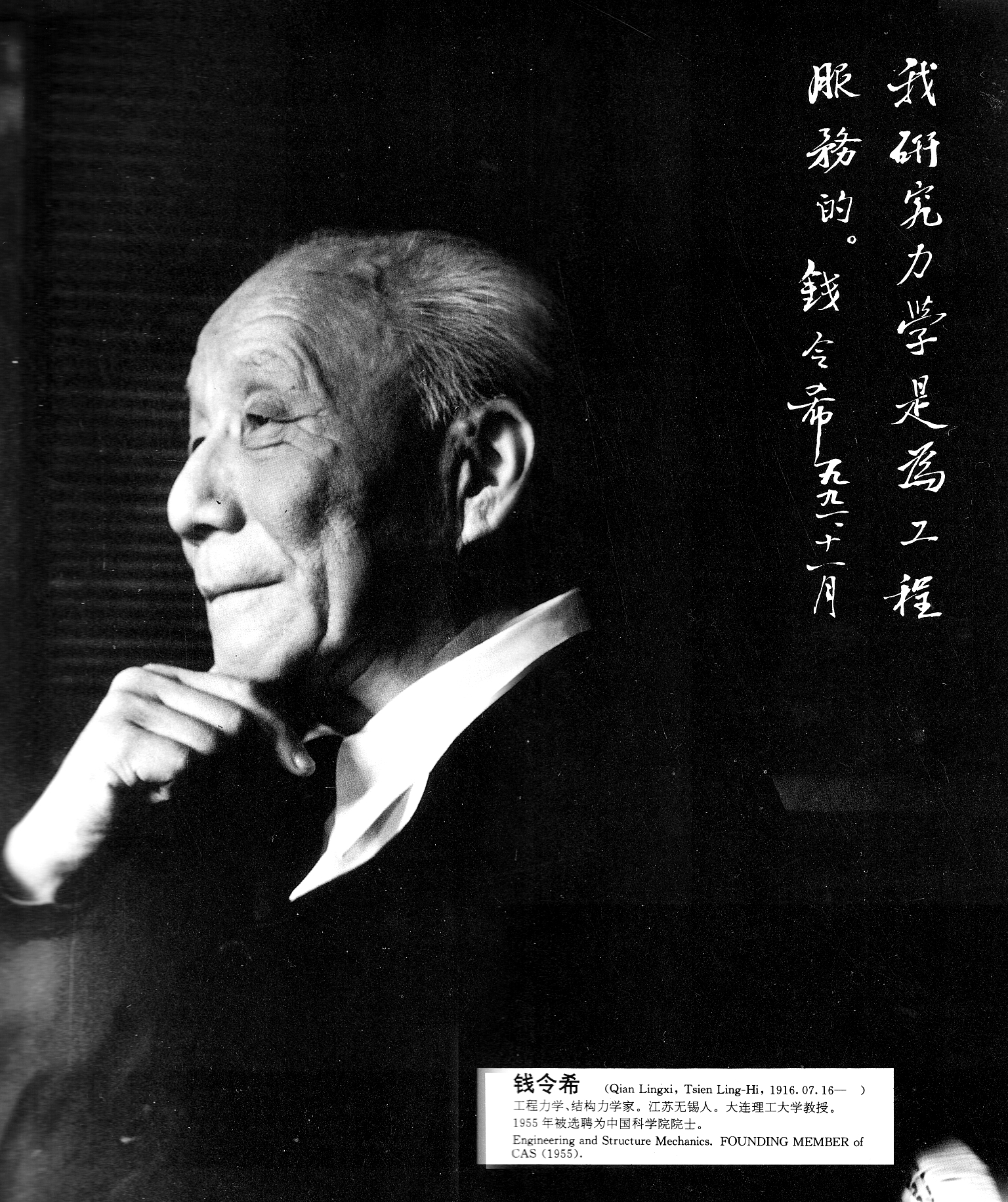
Prof Lingxi Qian

== Career ==
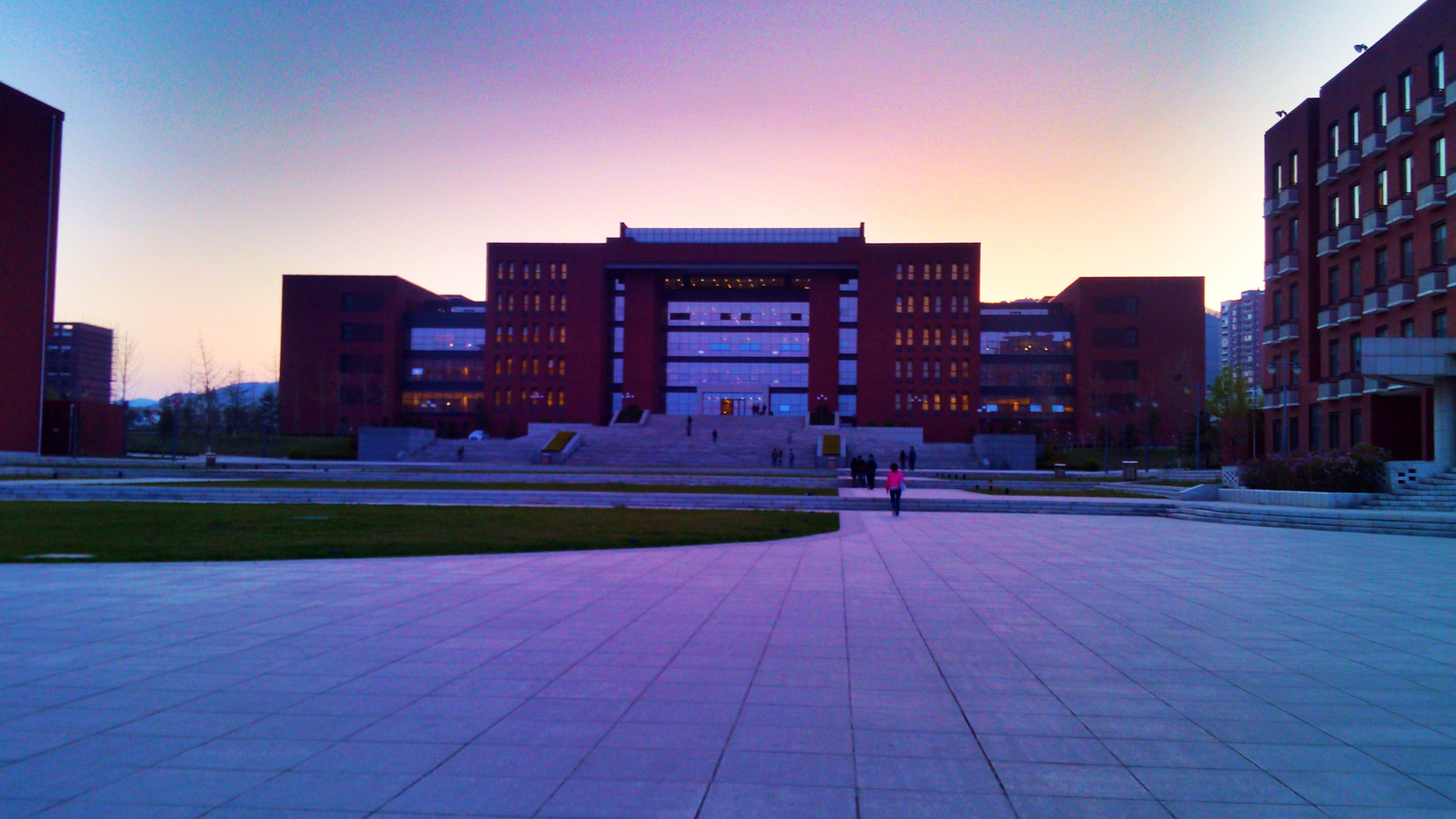
The Lingxi Library of DUT, inaugurated in 2009, is named after Qian Lingxi.

He returned to China in the fall of 1938, in the midst of the Second Sino-Japanese War. He participated in the design of the Yibin-Kunming and Sichuan-Yunnan railways, worked in the Bridge Design and Engineering Department of the Ministry of Communications, and taught at Yunnan University. In November 1943, he became professor of civil engineering at Zhejiang University, then exiled in Zunyi, Guizhou because Zhejiang was under Japanese occupation.

After the establishment of the People's Republic of China in 1949, Qian became Chair of the Department of Civil Engineering of Zhejiang University in 1950. In January 1952, after repeated invitations from Qu Bochuan, President of Dalian Institute of Technology (now Dalian University of Technology or DUT), Qian agreed to move to Dalian to teach at DUT. He spent the rest of his career there, and succeeded Qu as the second president of the university. In 1955, he became one of the founding members of the Chinese Academy of Sciences.

During the Cultural Revolution, top experts including Qian Lingxi and Huang Xuhua were denounced as "reactionary academic authorities" and dismissed from their posts. When China's nuclear submarine project needed Qian's help to analyze its structural designs, its leader Chen Youming had to appeal directly to Premier Zhou Enlai to make him available to the strategic program.

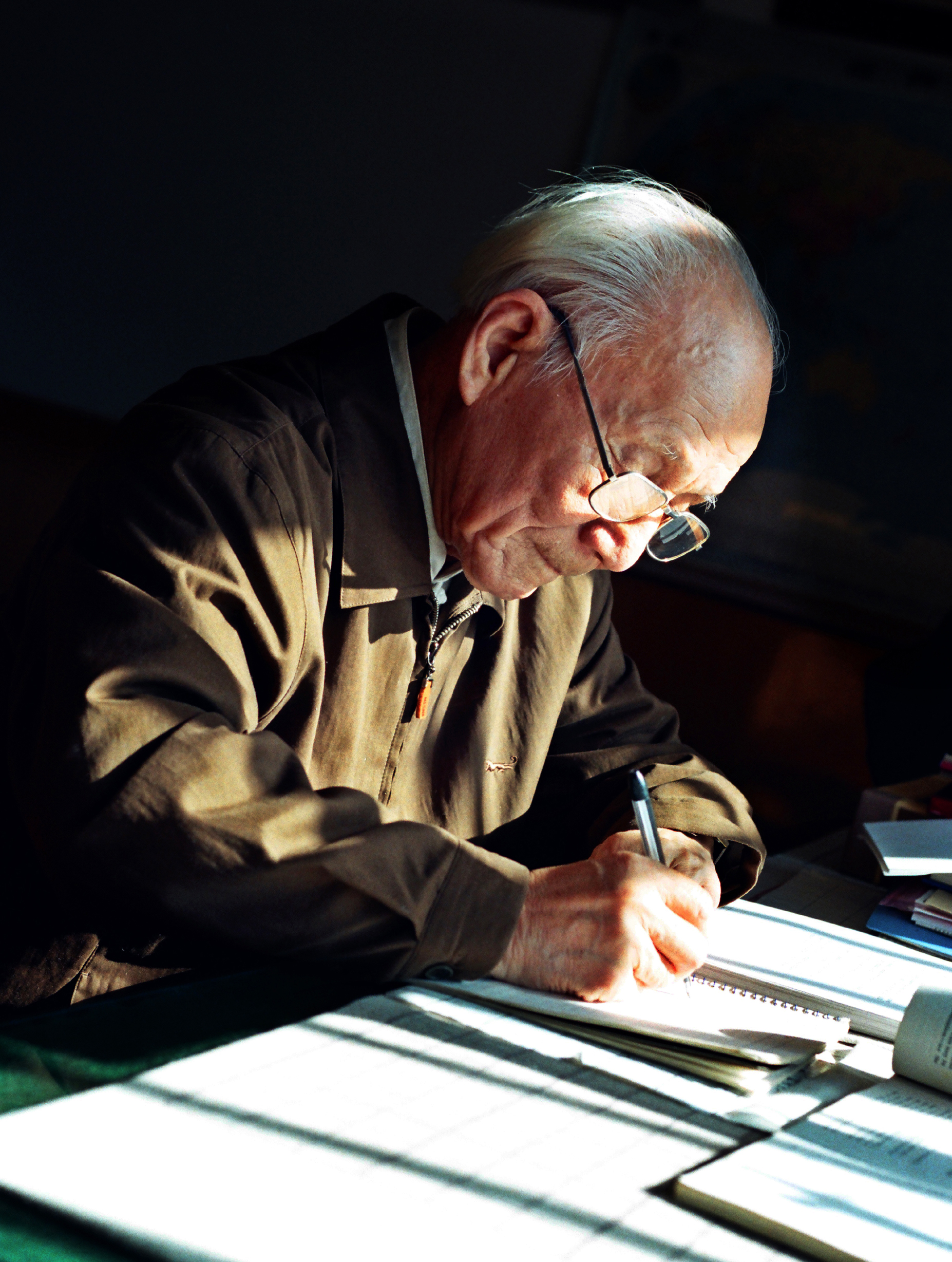

== Contributions ==
=== Research ===
Qian devoted himself to research in engineering structural mechanics. He made important contributions in variation principles to limit analysis, computational mechanics and structural optimization.

In 1950, Qian published his influential paper "Theory of Complementary Energy" in the journal Science in China. It led his student Hu Haichang to derive the Hu–Washizu principle in 1954.

In the early 1960s, Qian and his student Zhong Wanxie published two papers in Science in China and Acta Mechanica Sinica, on the "general variational theory of limit analysis and plasticity". Their research was used in submarine design and was awarded national prizes.

In the 1970s, Qian designed the main part of China's first modern petroleum port in Dalian, Liaoning. In the early 1980s, Qian, together with Zhong Wanxie and Cheng Gengdong, developed DDDU, an advanced computer system for structural design. DDDU was used in many major engineering projects.

=== Education ===
In 1951, Qian wrote two structural mechanics textbooks, which were widely used in Chinese universities and educated a generation of Chinese civil engineers.

Qian is celebrated in China as a "Bo Le" for scientists. Six of his former students have become academicians: Pan Jiazheng, Hu Haichang, Cheng Gengdong, Zhong Wanxie, Qiu Dahong, and Yang Jinzong. Pan Jiazheng, who was Qian's student at Zhejiang University, almost dropped out of college because of poverty. When Qian learned about his situation, he paid for Pan's tuition and living expenses out of his own pocket until his graduation. Pan would later become one of the chief engineers of the Three Gorges Dam.

=== Major publications ===
[1] Qian Lingxi, Hyperstatic Structure, China Science Book and Instrument Company, Shanghai, 1951.

[2] Qian Lingxi, Statically Determinate Structure, China Science Book Instrument Company, Shanghai, 1952.

[3] Б. Н. Жемочкин, On the Calculation of Lattice Cofferdams, Translated by Qian Lingxi. Transportation Ministry of Inland Waterway Technology Research Group, 1953.

[4] Э. Ф. Gorhuangwei, Т. В. Ender. Calculation of Dry Dock Floor on Compressible Foundation (B. A. Florin's method), Translated by Qian Lingxi and Gao Guofan. People's Communications Press, Beijing, 1955.

[5] (Based on the lecture notes prepared by Qian Lingxi) Compiled by the General Administration of Navigation Engineering, Ministry of Communications of the People's Republic of China, Port Building, Vol 1, Wharf Design, People's Communications Publishing House, Beijing, 1955.

[6] Н. Х. Arugiu Nieyang, Several Problems in Creep Theory, Translated by Wu Ruifeng, Lu Kuangzhou, Fang Xiaoshu, Zhao Deyong, Qian Lingxi, etc., Beijing Science Press, Beijing, 1961.

[7] Qian Lingxi and Zhong Wanxie, On Limit Analysis in Solid Mechanics and Suggest a General Variational Principle, The Science and Technology Commission of the Republic of China, Beijing, 1964.

[8] Qian Lingxi, editor in chief, Selected Papers on Structural Optimization, Guanghua Publishing House, Beijing, 1979.

[9] Qian Lingxi, Optimized Design of Engineering Structure (including drawings and errata), Printed by Dalian Institute of Technology, Dalian, 1981.

[10] Qian Lingxi, editor in chief, Proceedings of the 1980 National Conference on Computational Mechanics, Peking University Press, Beijing, 1981.

[11] W. J. Krefeld and W. G. Bowman, Nuclear Plate (Structural Element), Translated by Qian Lingxi, Science Press, Beijing, 1982.

[12] Qian Lingxi, Selected Papers of O. C. Zienkiewicz on Finite Element Method, China Academic Press, Beijing, 1982.

[13] Prepared by the Steel Bridge Design Group of the Engineering Mechanics Department of Dalian Institute of Technology, reviewed and updated by Qian Lingxi, All-Welded Hollow Truss Steel Bridge, People's Communications Press, Beijing, 1982.

[14] Qian Lingxi, Optimal Design of Engineering Structure, Water Conservancy and Electric Power Press, Beijing, 1983.

[15] Qian Lingxi, Statically Indeterminate and Statically Determinate Structure, Science Press, Beijing, 2011.

[16] Qian Lingxi, Optimal Design of Engineering Structure, Science Press, Beijing, 2011.

== Death and legacy ==
Qian died on 20 April 2009 in Dalian, at the age of 92. Top Chinese Communist Party (CCP) leaders, including CCP General Secretary Hu Jintao, former CCP General Secretary Jiang Zemin, Premier Wen Jiabao, and former Premier Li Peng, paid their respects at his funeral.

In the same year, DUT inaugurated its new library and named it Lingxi Library in his memory; it is one of the largest university libraries in Northeast China.
