= Zhong Wanxie =

Chinese civil engineer and physicist (1934–2023)

- 钟万勰
- Born: 24 February 1934; Shanghai, China
- Died: 12 November 2023 (aged 89); Dalian, Liaoning, China
- Education: Tongji University
- Scientific career
- Fields: Engineering Mechanics; Computational Mechanics
- Workplaces: Dalian University of Technology

Chinese name
- Simplified Chinese: 钟万勰
- Traditional Chinese: 鐘萬勰
Transcriptions
Standard Mandarin
- Hanyu Pinyin: Zhōng Wànxié

Zhong Wanxie (Chinese: 钟万勰; 24 February 1934 – 12 November 2023), also known as Wan-Xie Zhong, was a Chinese civil engineer and physicist. He was a professor at the Dalian University of Technology who specializes in computational mechanics and engineering mechanics. He pioneered computational mechanics in China and served as the founding Chairman of the Chinese Association for Computational Mechanics and an executive committee member of the International Association for Computational Mechanics. He was elected an academician of the Chinese Academy of Sciences in 1993.

== Biography ==
Zhong Wanxie was born on 24 February 1934 in Shanghai, Republic of China. His father, Zhong Zhaolin (钟兆琳), was a distinguished professor of electrical engineering at Shanghai Jiao Tong University. After graduating from Tongji University in 1956, he entered the Institute of Mechanics of the Chinese Academy of Sciences and studied under Qian Weichang and Hu Haichang. From 1958, he taught mechanics at the University of Science and Technology of China.

In 1962, on the recommendation of Hu Haichang, Zhong was transferred to the Dalian University of Technology (DUT) to work under Qian Lingxi. Their collaboration soon bore fruit. They published two papers in Science in China and Acta Mechanica Sinica, on the "general variational theory of limit analysis and plasticity". The research was used in submarine design and was awarded national prizes. He remained a professor at DUT for the rest of his career.

In the early 1970s, Zhong pioneered computational mechanics, the use of computer technology in mechanics, in China. He led a team of scientists, including Cheng Gengdong, that designed engineering software using group theory. It was successfully used to design major projects such as the Shanghai TV Tower, the Liaoning Indoor Stadium, and the Shanghai Indoor Stadium.

In 1984, he was elected the first chairman of the newly established Chinese Association for Computational Mechanics (CACM). Two years later, he was elected an executive committee member of the International Association for Computational Mechanics (IACM).

Zhong was elected an academician of the Chinese Academy of Sciences in 1993. He was awarded the State Natural Science Award multiple times and the Ho Leung Ho Lee Prize in Mathematics and Mechanics. He was an honorary professor of the University of Hong Kong and the University of Wales.

Zhong died on 12 November 2023, at the age of 89.
