= Albert C.J. Luo =

Chinese-American mechanical engineer

- 罗朝俊
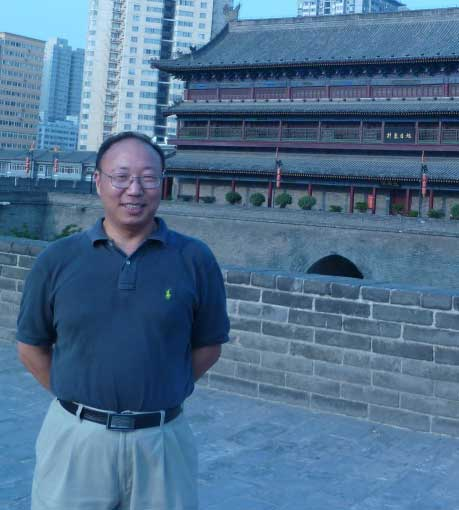
- Luo in 2016
- Born: Luo Chaojun; 1964 (age 61–62); China
- Citizenship: United States
- Education: Sichuan University of Science and Engineering (BS); Dalian University of Technology (MS); University of Manitoba (PhD)
- Scientific career
- Fields: Applied mechanics
- Workplaces: University of California, Berkeley; Southern Illinois University Edwardsville
- Thesis: Analytical modeling of bifurcations, chaos and multifractals in nonlinear dynamics (1996)
- Doctoral advisor: Ray Peng Siew Han (韩平畴)
- Website: Faculty page

Albert Chao Jun Luo (Chinese: 罗朝俊; born 1964) is a Chinese-American mechanical engineer. He is a Distinguished Research Professor at Southern Illinois University Edwardsville, where he has been a faculty member since 1998.

He authored books and articles in the fields of applied mathematics, nonlinear dynamics, and mechanics. His principal research interests lie in the field of Hamiltonian chaos, nonlinear mechanics, and discontinuous dynamical systems.

== Early life and education ==
Luo was born in 1964 in China.

Luo received a Bachelor of Science degree in mechanical engineering from the Sichuan University of Science and Engineering in China in 1984, a Master of Science degree in engineering mechanics from the Dalian University of Technology in China in 1990, and a Doctor of Philosophy degree in applied mechanics from the University of Manitoba in Canada in 1996. His doctoral supervisor was Ray Peng Siew Han (韩平畴). His doctoral dissertation was titled Analytical modeling of bifurcations, chaos and multifractals in nonlinear dynamics (1996).

== Career ==
From 1996 to 1998, Luo was an NSERC (Natural Sciences and Engineering Research Council of Canada) postdoctoral fellow at the University of California, Berkeley.

Since 1998, Luo has been a faculty member at Southern Illinois University Edwardsville, where he has held the positions of assistant professor, associate professor, full professor, and distinguished research professor.

Luo received the 2014 Distinguished Research Professor Award from Southern Illinois University Edwardsville.

== Research ==
Luo developed stability and bifurcation theory in nonlinear dynamical systems, and he also established the theoretical frames of discontinuous dynamical systems for many applications in science and engineering, and he developed analytical techniques that is very efficient to achieve periodic motions to chaos analytically. Since the 18th century, one has extensively used techniques such as perturbation methods to obtain approximate analytical solutions of periodic motions in nonlinear systems. Towards analytical chaos in nonlinear systems systematically presents an analytical approach to determine periodic flows to chaos or quasi-periodic flows in nonlinear dynamical systems with/without time-delay. The presented analytical techniques provide a better understanding of regularity and complexity of periodic motions to chaos in nonlinear dynamical systems. Luo developed a dynamical system synchronization theory based on the local singularity theory of discontinuous dynamical systems. Luo developed the implicit mapping dynamics for semi-analytical solutions of periodic motions to chaos in nonlinear systems, which are from symbolic dynamics to mapping dynamics in nonlinear dynamical systems. Further, one can measure chaos deterministically instead of stochastically. The quadratic dynamical systems presented by Luo provides a way to solve the Hilbert's 16th problems. Such a theory presents the bifurcations of the 1-dimensional flows in nonlinear dynamical systems. The infinite-equilibriums are the switching bifurcations of the two sets of equilibriums. Techniques can be implemented and applied to science and engineering.

His major contributions on nonlinear dynamical systems are:

- A theory for stochastic and resonant layers in nonlinear Hamiltonian systems
- A local theory and singularity for discontinuous dynamical systems
- Flow barriers theory for discontinuous dynamical systems
- Synchronization of continuous dynamical systems under specific constraints
- Synchronization and companion of discrete dynamical systems
- Analytical solutions of periodic motions to chaos in nonlinear systems
- Discretization and implicit mapping dynamics in nonlinear dynamical systems
- Analytical periodic flows to chaos in time-delay systems
- Semi-analytical solutions of periodic motions to chaos in nonlinear systems
- Infinite homoclinic orbits in 3-D nonlinear systems (e.g., Lorenz and Rösller systems)
- Memorized nonlinear dynamical systems and time-delay
- Two-dimensional quadratic dynamical systems
- Two-dimensional cubic dynamical Systems
- Two-dimensional polynomial dynamical Systems (e.g., Hilbert 16th problems)

In addition, Luo developed accurate theories for nonlinear deformable-body dynamics, machine tool dynamics and others:

- An approximate plate theory
- A theory for soft structures
- A nonlinear theory for beams and rods
- Fluid-induced nonlinear structural vibration
- A large damage theory for anisotropic materials
- A generalized fractal theory

He has published over 400 peer-reviewed journal and conference papers. Luo was an editor for the Journal Communications in Nonlinear Science and Numerical simulation, and Luo is editors for the book series on Nonlinear Systems and Complexity (Springer), and Nonlinear Physical Science (Higher Education Press).

=== Publications ===
List of monographs
  - Albert C. J. Luo, Single Linear-Bivariate Cubic Systems, World Scientific (2026).
  - Albert C. J. Luo, Introduction to Infinite-Equilibriums in Dynamical Systems, Springer (2025).
  - Yeyin Xu, Jianzhe Huang ,Albert C. J. Luo, Analytical Dynamics of Nonlinear Rotors, Springer (2025).
  - Albert C. J. Luo, Two-dimensional Crossing and Product Polynomial Systems, Springer (2025).
  - Albert C. J. Luo, Two-dimensional Self and Product Polynomial Systems, Springer (2025).
  - Albert C. J. Luo, Two-dimensional Constant and Product Polynomial Systems, Springer (2025).
  - Albert C. J. Luo, Two-dimensional Crossing and Product Cubic Systems, Vol. II: Crossing-linear and Self-quadratic Product Vector Field, Springer (2025).
  - Albert C. J. Luo, Two-dimensional Crossing and Product Cubic Systems, Vol. I: Self-linear and Crossing-quadratic Product Vector Field, Springer (2025).
  - Albert C. J. Luo, Two-dimensional Self and Product Cubic Systems, Vol. II: Crossing-linear and Self-quadratic Product Vector Field, Springer (2024).
  - Albert C. J. Luo, Two-dimensional Self and Product Cubic Systems, Vol. I:Self-linear and Crossing-quadratic Product Vector Field, Springer (2024).
  - Albert C. J. Luo, Two-dimensional Two Product Cubic Systems, Vol. III:Self-linear and Crossing Quadratic Product Vector Fields, Springer (2024).
  - Albert C. J. Luo, Two-dimensional Two-product Cubic Systems Vol. II: Crossing-linear and Self-quadratic Product Vector Fields, Springer (2024).
  - Albert C. J. Luo, Two-dimensional Two-product Cubic Systems, Vol. I: Different Product Structure Vector Fields, Springer (2024).
  - Albert C. J. Luo, Two-dimensional Product-Cubic Systems, Vol. IV: Crossing-quadratic Vector Fields, Springer (2024).
  - Albert C. J. Luo, Two-dimensional Product Cubic Systems, Vol. III: Self-Quadratic Vector Fields, Springer (2024).
  - Albert C. J. Luo, Two-dimensional Product-Cubic Systems, Vol.II: Product-quadratic Vector Fields, Springer (2024).
  - Albert C. J. Luo, Two-dimensional Product-Cubic Systems, Vol. I: Constant and Linear Vector Fields, Springer (2024).
  - Albert C. J. Luo, Two-dimensional Crossing-Variable Cubic Nonlinear Systems, Springer (2024).
  - Albert C. J. Luo, Two-dimensional Self-independent Variable Cubic Nonlinear Systems, Springer (2024).
  - Albert C. J. Luo, Two-dimensional Single-Variable Cubic Nonlinear Systems, Vol. II: A Crossing-variable Cubic Vector Field, Springer (2024).
  - Albert C. J. Luo, Two-dimensional Single-Variable Cubic Nonlinear Systems, Vol. I:A Self-univariate Cubic Vector Field, Springer (2024).
  - Albert C. J. Luo, Limit Cycles and Homoclinic Networks in Two-Dimensional Polynomial Systems, Springer (2025).
  - Albert C. J. Luo, 1-dimensional Flow Arrays and Bifurcations in Planar Polynomial Systems, Springer (2024).
  - Albert C. J. Luo, Two-Dimensional Quadratic Nonlinear Systems Volume I: Univariate Vector Fields (Nonlinear Physical Science), Springer (2023).
  - Yu Guo, Albert C. J. Luo, Periodic Motions to Chaos in a Spring-Pendulum System (Synthesis Lectures on Mechanical Engineering), Springer (2023).
  - Albert C. J. Luo, Chuan Guo,Nonlinear Vibration Reduction: An Electromagnetically Tuned Mass Damper System (Synthesis Lectures on Mechanical Engineering), Springer (2022).
  - Albert C. J. Luo, Two-Dimensional Quadratic Nonlinear Systems Volume II: Bivariate Vector Fields (Nonlinear Physical Science), Springer (2021).
  - Albert C. J. Luo,Polynomial Functional Dynamical Systems (Synthesis Lectures on Mechanical Engineering), Springer (2021).
  - Albert C. J. Luo, Siyu Guo,Towards Analytical Chaotic Evolutions in Brusselators (Synthesis Lectures on Mechanical Engineering), Springer (2020).
  - Albert C. J. Luo, Bifurcation Dynamics in Polynomial Discrete Systems (Nonlinear Physical Science), Springer (2020).
  - Albert C. J. Luo, Bifurcation and Stability in Nonlinear Discrete Systems (Nonlinear Physical Science), Springer (2020).
  - Siyuan Xing, Albert C. J. Luo, Sequential Bifurcation Trees to Chaos in Nonlinear Time-Delay Systems (Synthesis Lectures on Mechanical Engineering), Springer (2020).
  - Yu Guo, Albert C. J. Luo, Bifurcation Dynamics of a Damped Parametric Pendulum (Synthesis Lectures on Mechanical Engineering), Springer (2020).
  - Albert C. J. Luo, Bifurcation and Stability in Nonlinear Dynamical Systems (Nonlinear Systems and Complexity), Springer (2019).
  - Albert C. J. Luo, Resonance and Bifurcation to Chaos in Pendulum (Nonlinear Physical Science), World Scientific (2017).
  - Albert C. J. Luo, Bo Yu, Galloping Instability to Chaos of Cables (Nonlinear Physical Science), Springer (2017).
  - Albert C. J. Luo, Periodic Flows to Chaos in Time-delay Systems (Nonlinear Systems and Complexity), Springer (2016).
  - Albert C. J. Luo, Memorized Discrete Systems and Time-delay (Nonlinear Systems and Complexity), Springer (2016).
  - Albert C. J. Luo, Discretization and Implicit Mapping Dynamics (Nonlinear Physical Science), Springer (2015).
  - Albert C. J. Luo, Dennis M. O'Connor, System Dynamics with Interaction Discontinuity (Nonlinear Systems and Complexity), Springer (2015).
  - Albert C. J. Luo, Toward Analytical Chaos in Nonlinear Systems, Wiley (2014).
  - Albert C. J. Luo, Analytical Routes to Chaos in Nonlinear Engineering, Wiley (2014).
  - Albert C. J. Luo, Yu Guo, Vibro-impact Dynamics, Wiley (2013).
  - Albert C. J. Luo, Dynamical System Synchronization (Nonlinear Systems and Complexity), Springer (2013).
  - Albert C. J. Luo, Regularity and Complexity in Dynamical Systems (Nonlinear Systems and Complexity), Springer (2012).
  - Albert C. J. Luo, Continuous Dynamical Systems (Mathematical Methods and Modeling), L & H Scientific Publishing-HEP (2012).
  - Albert C. J. Luo, Discrete and Switching Dynamical Systems (Mathematical Methods and Modeling), L & H Scientific Publishing-HEP (2012).
  - Albert C. J. Luo, Discontinuous Dynamical Systems, Springer (2012).
  - Brandon C. Gegg, C. Steve Suh, Albert C.J. Luo Machine Tool Vibrations and Cutting Dynamics, Springer (2011).
  - Albert C. J. Luo, Nonlinear Deformable-body Dynamics (Nonlinear Physical Science), Springer (2010).
  - Albert C. J. Luo, Discontinuous Dynamical Systems on Time-varying Domains (Nonlinear Physical Science), Springer (2009).
  - Albert C. J. Luo, Global Transversality, Resonance and Chaotic Dynamics, World Scientific(2008).
  - Albert C. J. Luo, Singularity and Dynamics on Discontinuous Vector Fields, Elsevier Science (2006).
