= Cheng Gengdong =

Chinese civil engineer and physicist

Cheng Gengdong (Chinese: 程耿东; born September 1941), also known as Geng-Dong Cheng, is a Chinese civil engineer and physicist who specializes in engineering mechanics and computational mechanics. He is a professor at the Dalian University of Technology and served as president from 1995 to 2006. He is an academician of the Chinese Academy of Sciences and a foreign fellow of the Russian Academy of Sciences.

== Biography ==
Cheng was born in Suzhou, Jiangsu, Republic of China in September 1941. After graduating from Peking University in 1964, he pursued postgraduate studies at the Dalian University of Technology (DUT) from 1964 to 1968. He earned his Ph.D. from the Technical University of Denmark in 1980.

In the early 1980s, Cheng, together with Zhong Wanxie and their advisor Qian Lingxi, developed DDDU, an advanced computer system for structural design. DDDU was used in many major engineering projects.

Cheng served as Vice President of DUT from 1985 to 1995, and as president from 1995 to 2006. He published more than 200 research papers, three monographs, and two translated books.

Cheng was elected an academician of the Chinese Academy of Sciences in 1995, and a foreign fellow of the Russian Academy of Sciences in 2011. He won the State Natural Science Award (Second Class) twice, the Ho Leung Ho Lee Prize in Mathematics and Mechanics, and many other awards. He was awarded Honorary Doctorate degrees by Aalborg University of Denmark and the University of Liège of Belgium.
