= Qiu Dahong =

Chinese coastal and offshore engineer (1930–2025)

- 邱大洪
- Born: 6 April 1930; Shanghai, China
- Died: 11 January 2025 (aged 94); Dalian, Liaoning, China
- Education: Tsinghua University
- Scientific career
- Fields: Coastal engineering Offshore geotechnical engineering
- Workplaces: Dalian University of Technology

Qiu Dahong (Chinese: 邱大洪; pinyin: Qiū Dàhóng; 6 April 1930 – 11 January 2025) was a Chinese coastal and offshore engineer. He served as chief engineer of the Dalian Fishing Port, the New Dalian Port, the Qinhuangdao Petroleum Port, and many other projects. He was a professor of the Dalian University of Technology and directed the State Key Laboratory of Coastal and Offshore Engineering. He was elected an academician of the Chinese Academy of Sciences in 1991.

== Life and career ==
Qiu was born on 6 April 1930 in Shanghai, Republic of China, with his ancestral home in Huzhou, Zhejiang. After graduating from the Department of Civil Engineering of Tsinghua University in 1951, he joined the Dalian University of Technology (DUT), where he worked under Professor Qian Lingxi and helped create China's first port and harbour engineering program.

In 1958, Qiu was appointed chief engineer for the construction of Dalian Fishing Port at the age of 28. The port, designed to occupy 50,000 square metres (540,000 sq ft) of open water with docks for 300 fishing boats, was unprecedented in China in both scale and difficulty. When completed in 1966, it was Asia's largest fishing port. In 1987, Qiu again served as chief engineer for the port's expansion project, which was completed in 1989.

In 1973, Qiu became chief engineer of the New Dalian Port, the first port in China capable of handling oil tankers with a displacement of 100,000 tons. It was opened in 1976, and won a national gold medal for its design.

Qiu later led or participated in the design of the Qinhuangdao Petroleum Port, the Lianyungang Container Port, the Shenzhen Chiwan Port, the Hainan Petroleum Port, the Yamen Shipping Channel of the Pearl River estuary, and the Yangshan Port of Shanghai.

Qiu served as Director of the State Key Laboratory of Coastal and Offshore Engineering at DUT and was elected an academician of the Chinese Academy of Sciences in 1991. In 1992, he was elected a Central Committee member of the Jiusan Society.

On 11 January 2025, Qiu died in Dalian at the age of 94.

== Publications ==
Qiu published more than 100 scientific papers and multiple monographs and textbooks. In addition to coastal and offshore engineering, he researched wave theory and conducted experiments to calculate the forces that sea waves exert on engineering structures. In 2011, China Ocean Press published The Collective Writings of Qiu Dahong (邱大洪文集), which includes 93 scientific papers, 15 published articles on port construction projects, and 20 other articles.
