= Kyūichirō Washizu =

Kyūichirō Washizu (鷲津 久一郎, Washizu Kyūichirō; March 12, 1921 – November 25, 1981) was a Japanese aircraft engineer and academic. He served as professor of aeronautical engineering at the University of Tokyo and professor of engineering science at the Osaka University. He led the performance-related design of the kamikaze attack aircraft Yokosuka MXY-7 Ohka during World War II.

== Life ==
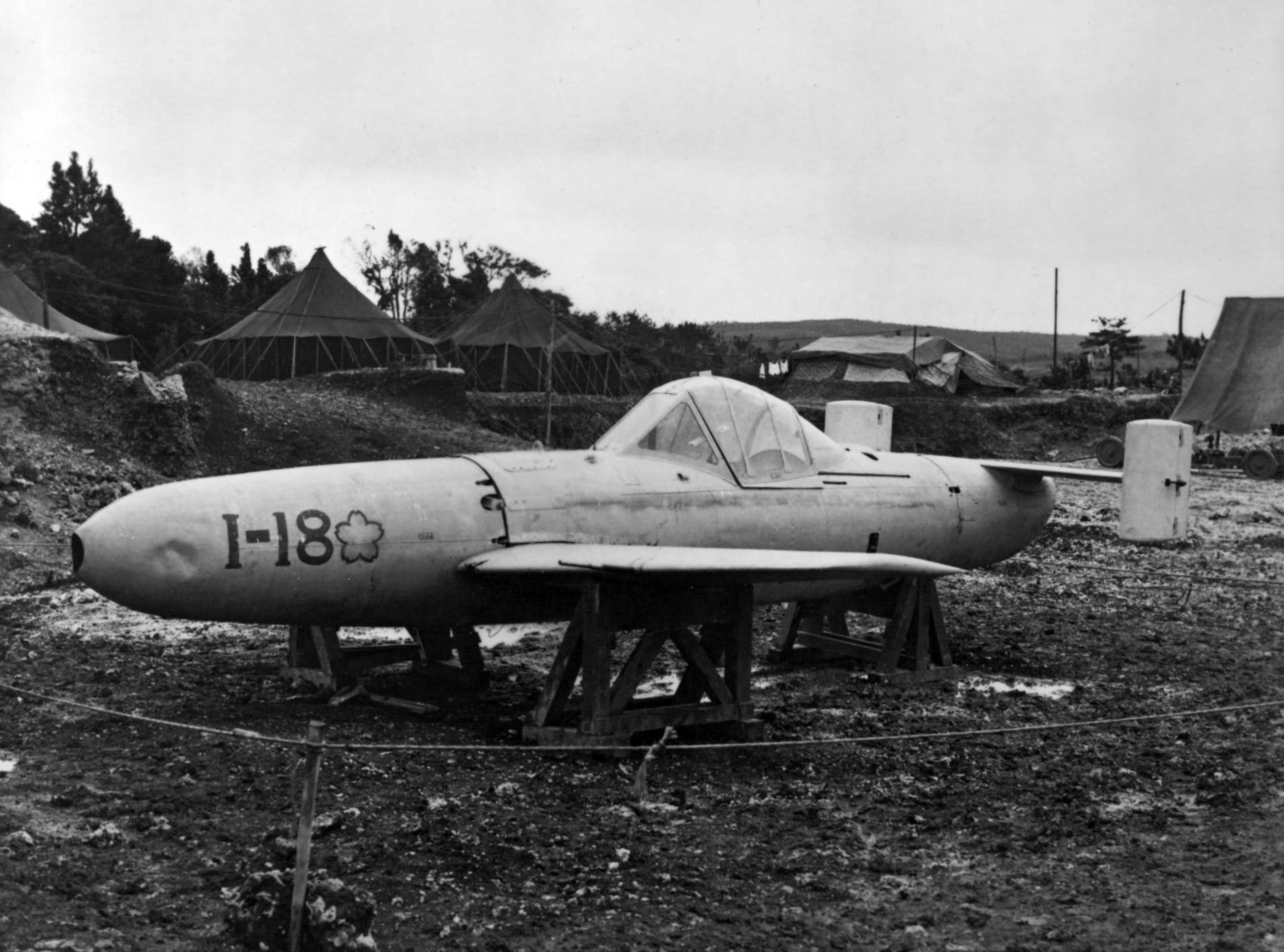
Yokosuka MXY-7 Ohka (1945)

Washizu was born in Aichi Prefecture on March 12, 1921. After graduating from Ichinomiya High School, he entered the Tokyo Imperial University, Faculty of Engineering. In 1957, he obtained PhD. in Engineering with his thesis "Study on approximate solution methods in elastic mechanics".

As Captain Technical, Washizu took part in the design of the attack aircraft Yokosuka MXY-7 Ohka during World War II. He was in charge of performance-related design of the aircraft, and worked alongside Lieutenant Colonel Technical Masao Yamana, as design director; Toshikazu Kitayama, in charge of general design; Major Technical Rokurō Hattori, in charge of structure; and Takio Kitano, in charge of aerodynamics. During the design, the five confined themselves in one room at the Yokosuka Naval Air Technical Arsenal.

He served as assistant professor and then as professor at the Department of Aeronautical Engineering, University of Tokyo. He also served as professor at the School of Engineering Science, Osaka University.

His daughter Hiroko Washizu (born 1952) is a scholar of American literature and professor at the University of Tsukuba.

Washizu died on November 25, 1981.

== See also ==
- Hu–Washizu principle
- Otto C. Koppen
- Leonard Bairstow
