= Yang Jinzong =

Chinese chemical engineer (1932–2008)

Yang Jinzong (Chinese: 杨锦宗; 25 August 1932 – 29 December 2008) was a Chinese chemical engineer who specialized in fine chemicals. He was a professor of the Dalian University of Technology and an academician of the Chinese Academy of Engineering.

== Biography ==
Yang was born 25 August 1932 in Changtai Township (常太乡), Putian, Fujian, China.

He studied at the Northeast Institute of Technology (now Northeastern University) from 1951 to 1952 and transferred to the Dalian Institute of Technology. After graduating from the Department of Chemical Engineering of DIT in 1955, he pursued graduate studies for four years and obtained an associate doctor degree in 1959, with a specialty in dyes. He was subsequently hired by DIT as a faculty member, and he remained at the university (later renamed Dalian University of Technology) for the rest of his career. From 1983 to 1984 he was a visiting scholar at ETH Zurich in Switzerland.

Yang's research focus was on fine chemicals. He developed new dyes and surfactants which have been widely used in industry. He published more than 500 research papers and two monographs, and held 13 patents. He won the State Science and Technology Progress Award (Second Class) in 2001 and seven other national or ministerial level awards. He also trained more than 100 graduate students. He was elected an academician of the Chinese Academy of Engineering in 2001.

Yang died on 29 December 2008 in Dalian, at the age of 76.
