= Lingxi Library =

University library in Dalian, China

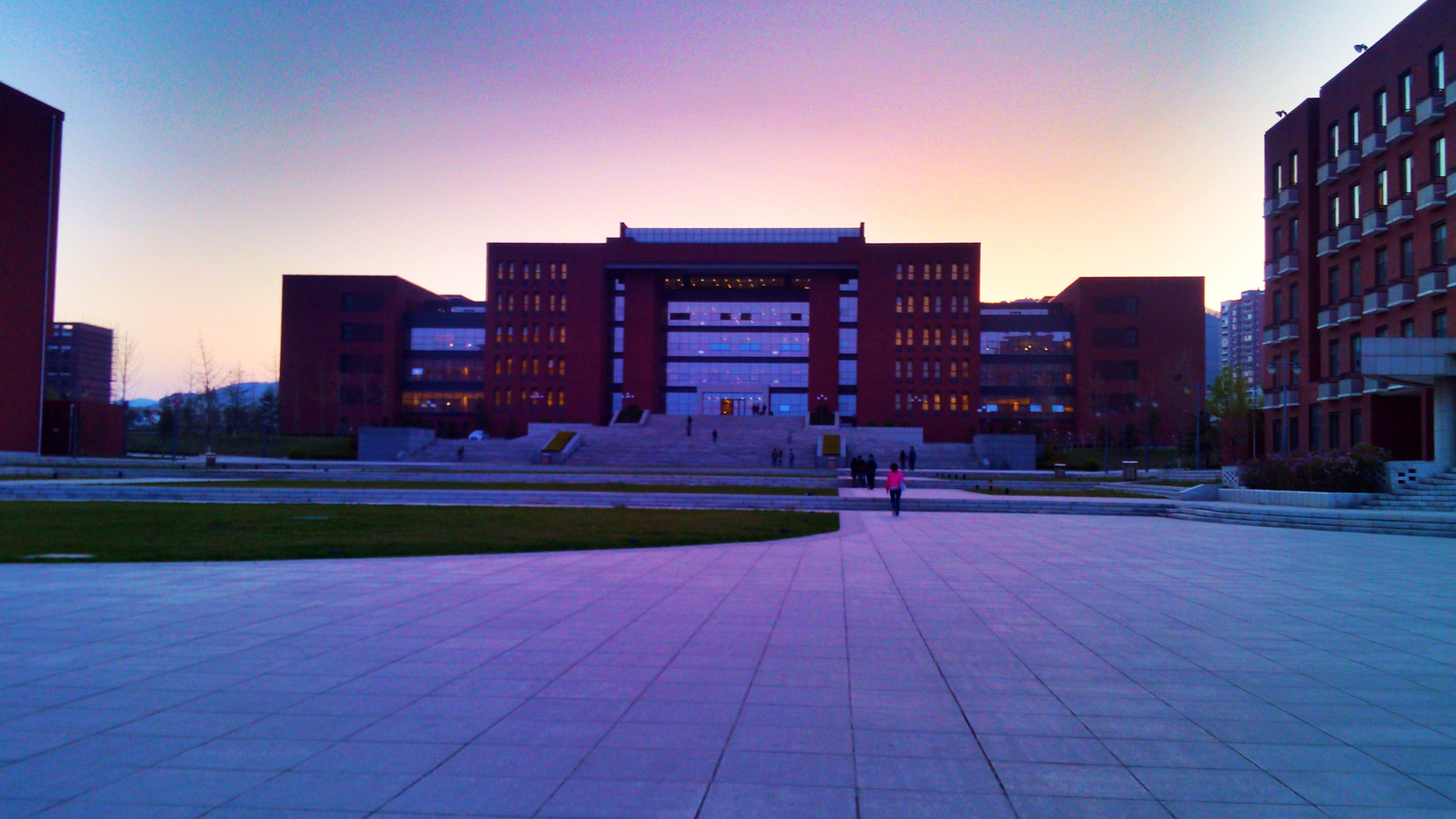
Lingxi Library at dusk

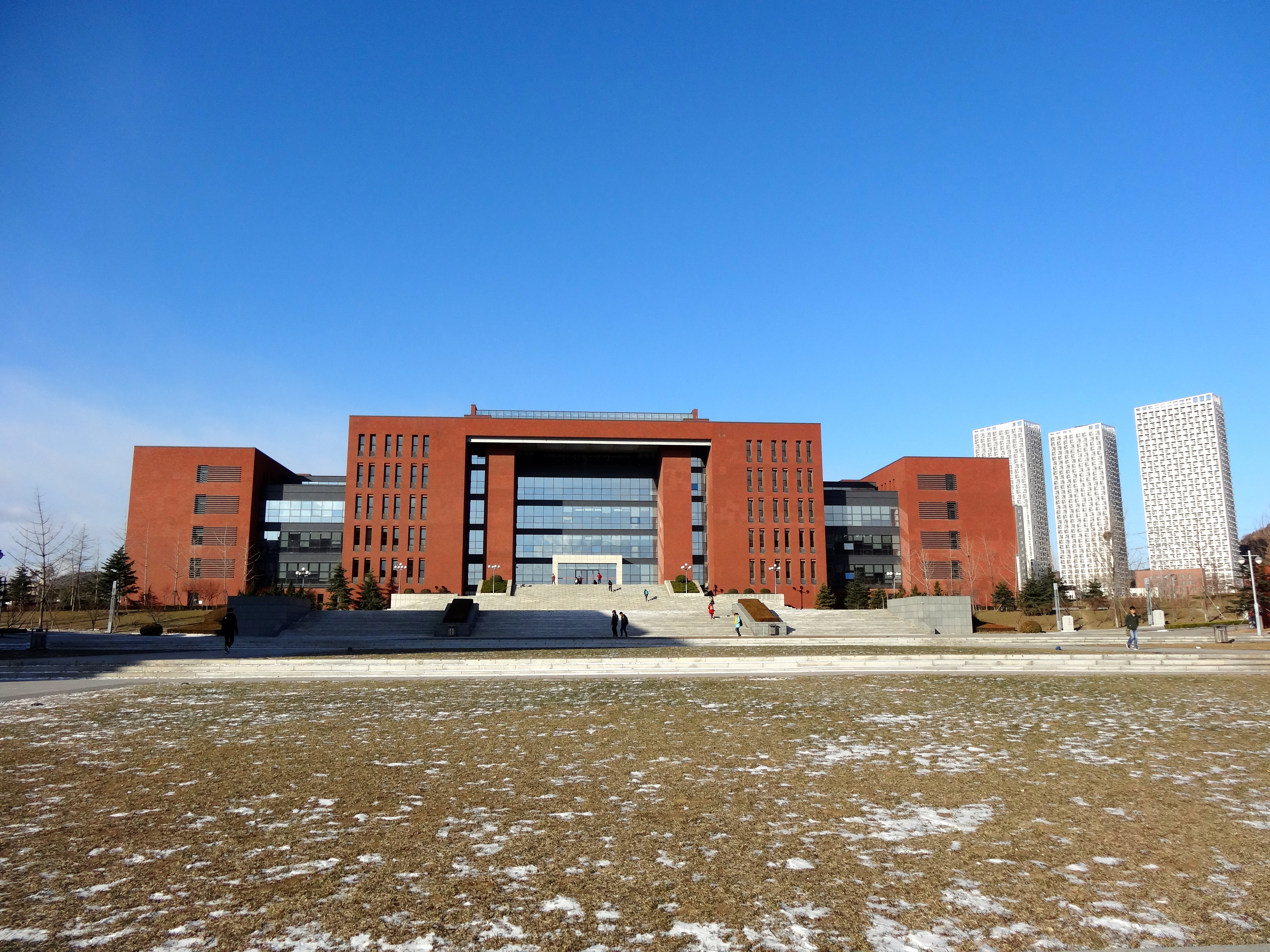
Lingxi Library

The Lingxi Library (Chinese: 令希图书馆) is the main library of the Dalian University of Technology (DUT) in Dalian, Liaoning, China. It is named after Qian Lingxi, a famous scientist and academician who served as the second president of DUT. Opened in 2009, it is one of the largest university libraries in Northeast China.

== Overview ==
The Lingxi Library is located at the western end point of the east–west axis on the campus of Dalian University of Technology.

The building design itself emphasizes the contrast of simple rectangular layout and clear structure. From an aesthetic point of view, it reflects simplicity and openness. The core of the building is a five-story hall. It acts not only as the main body for traffic, but also as the command center of the whole library. The grand roof above the main entrance is a shelter to show care for library-users. The whole building is intended to convey that people are cared for and learning is a perpetual pursuit.

The outside wall consists of red brick, dark metal and tint glass. The library facade strives to find a balance point between classical and contemporary. It combines modern techniques and materials with architectural expression enhancing the image and characteristics of the core building. The construction area is 30,000 square meters. There are 3,000 seats.

A large bronze statue of Qian Lingxi was unveiled in the library on July 16, 2012, the 96th anniversary of his birth. The sculpture is the work of sculptor Wei Deng who works in Dalian University of Technology. The statue is placed on a marble base located just inside the library.

== See also ==
- List of libraries in China
