= Pan Jiazheng =

Chinese hydraulic engineer and poet

Pan Jiazheng (simplified Chinese: 潘家铮; traditional Chinese: 潘家錚; pinyin: Pān Jiāzhēng; November 12, 1927 – July 13, 2012) was a Chinese hydraulic engineer and poet.

== Biography ==
Pan was born in Shaoxing, Zhejiang, China, and lost his father at a young age. He was accepted by the Department of Civil Engineering of Zhejiang University, but almost dropped out because of poverty. His professor, Qian Lingxi, saw promise in him and paid for his tuition out of his own pocket until his graduation in 1950. He was an academician and the Vice-president of the Chinese Academy of Engineering (CAE), and an academician of Chinese Academy of Sciences. He served as the former Chief Director of the Chinese Society for Rock Mechanics and Engineering, and the technical chief for the Three Gorges Dam.
