= Hu–Washizu principle =

Variational principle in continuum mechanics

In continuum mechanics, and in particular in finite element analysis, the Hu–Washizu principle is a variational principle which says that the action

$$\int_{V^e} \left[ \frac{1}{2} \varepsilon^T C \varepsilon - \sigma^T \varepsilon + \sigma^T (\nabla u) - \bar{p}^T u \right] dV - \int_{S_\sigma^e} \bar{T}^T u\ dS$$

is stationary, where $C$ is the elastic stiffness tensor. The Hu–Washizu principle is used to develop mixed finite element methods. The principle is named after Hu Haichang and Kyūichirō Washizu.

The Euler–Lagrange equations of the Hu–Washizu functional are the following equations:

$$\begin{cases}
\nabla \cdot \boldsymbol{\sigma} + \mathbf{f} = \mathbf{0} & \text{(Equilibrium)} \\
\boldsymbol{\sigma} = \frac{\partial W}{\partial \boldsymbol{\varepsilon}} & \text{(Constitutive law)} \\
\boldsymbol{\varepsilon} = \nabla^s \mathbf{u} & \text{(Compatibility)}
\end{cases}$$

with appropriate boundary conditions

$\boldsymbol{\sigma} \cdot \mathbf{n} = \mathbf{t} \quad \text{on} \quad \partial \Omega_t$.
