= Qu Bochuan =

- 屈伯川
- Born: November 16, 1909; Luzhou, Sichuan, China
- Died: February 18, 1997 (aged 87); Dalian, Liaoning, China
- Education: Nanjing University; Dresden University of Technology
- Occupations: Educator, chemical engineer
- Known for: Founding president of Dalian University of Technology
- Honors: Honorary President of DUT; “Special Contribution” award for MBA education (2006)

Qu Bochuan (Chinese: 屈伯川; pinyin: Qū Bóchuān; November 16, 1909 – February 18, 1997), was a scholar and educator in China, and principal founder of the Dalian University of Technology.

== Biography ==
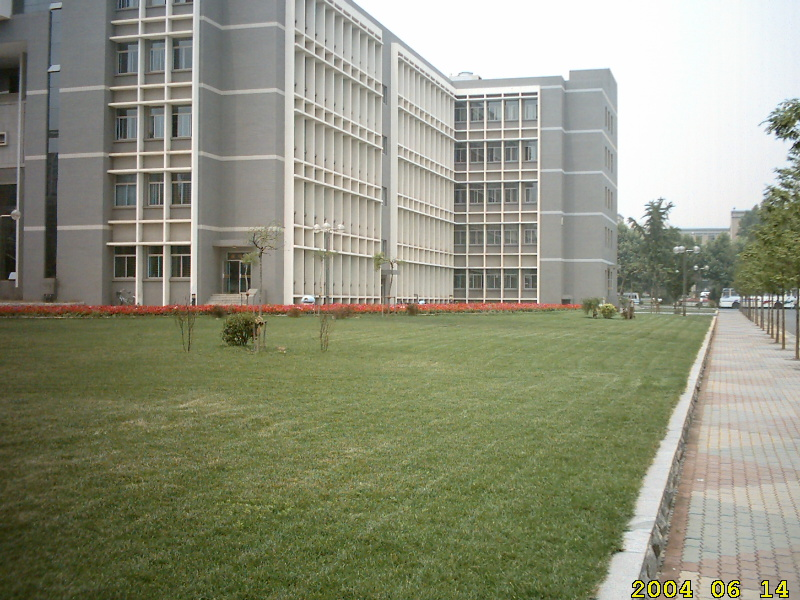
Bochuan Library on the campus of DUT

Qu was born in Luzhou, Sichuan, China. In 1928, he went to Nanjing University for his bachelor's degree of chemistry. In 1934, he went to Germany and later got his doctoral degree from the Dresden University of Technology, majoring in Chemical Engineering. Then he came back to China in 1938, exploring a way to improve the Chinese technical and educational development. Introduced by Zhou Enlai, he went to Yan'an. Later the same year, he participated in the foundation of the Yan’an Institute of Natural Science, directly reported to Mao Zedong on this project, and held the position of the academic dean of the institute. From 1938 to 1948, he served as a variety of technical development positions assigned by the central government, e.g., the director of the experimental institute of the Shanxi-Chaha’er-Hebei Military Area.

Then he was sent to the city of Dalian to initiate the first tertiary technical school under the Communist Party. He then served as the first president of Dalian University of Technology from September 1948 to September 1981, though interrupted by the Cultural Revolution in between.

In 1980, based on the cooperation agreement between the US and Chinese governments, together with Jordan J. Baruch, and many others, founded the first MBA program in China in the Dalian University of Technology.

He took up the position of honorary president of the Dalian University of technology in 1981 and obtained the award for the 'Highlighted Seniors' from the State Educational Commission the same year. Later he was elected the committee member of the Sixth Chinese People's Political Consultative Conference.

In 1997, A new library of the university was built and was named after him as the principal founder and the first President.

In 2006, he was awarded the "Special Contribution" award for his efforts in facilitating Chinese MBA education. There are only two people who got this award, he and Dr. Jordan J. Baruch.

== See also ==
- Qu (surname 屈)
