= Hu Haichang =

Chinese mechanical and aerospace engineer

Hu Haichang (Chinese: 胡海昌; pinyin: Hú Hǎichāng; April 25, 1928 – February 21, 2011) was a Chinese mechanical and aerospace engineer. He was in charge of the early phase development for the Dong Fang Hong I, China's first artificial satellite. Hu was an academician of the Chinese Academy of Sciences.

== Biography ==
Hu was born in Hangzhou, Zhejiang Province in April 1928. Hu graduated from the Department of Civil Engineering, Zhejiang University in Hangzhou, and his academic advisor was Chien Wei-zang.

After graduation, Hu joined the Institute of Mechanics of the Chinese Academy of Sciences (CAS) in Beijing, which was mainly founded by Tsien Hsue-shen in 1950s. From 1968 until retired, Hu worked for the CAS Department of Spacecraft System Design.

Hu mainly generalized some versatile variational principles especially in elastic mechanics and promoted their corresponding applications such as in the spacecraft system design. Hu worked for China's spacecraft system design as early as 1966. Hu was in charge of the general system and structure design both for the Dong Fang Hong I and Dong Fang Hong II satellites in their early development phases.

In 1993, Hu became a senior advisor and member of the Science and Technology Commission of the China Aerospace Science and Technology Corporation, a technical consultant of the China Academy of Space Technology. He was also the Honorary Director of the Science and Technology Commission of the Department of Spacecraft System Design.

Hu was the Chief Director of the Chinese Society for Vibrational Engineering (中国振动工程学会) and a vice-president of the Chinese Society of Mechanics (中国力学学会).

Hu was a part-time professor of Peking University, Zhejiang University and Jilin University, and he was titled as an Honorary Professor of Qingdao University. Hu was elected as a member of the Chinese Academy of Sciences.

== Academic contributions ==
The Hu–Washizu principle and the Hu–Washizu functional in continuum mechanics is named after him.

The Hu Hai-chang's solution or Hu's solution for the 3-dimensional problems in the theory of elasticity of a transversely isotropic body, is also named after Hu.
