= Dalian University of Technology =

Public university in Dalian, Liaoning, China

Coordinates: 38°52′28″N 121°32′01″E

- 大连理工大学
- Motto: 海纳百川，自强不息，厚德笃学，知行合一
- Type: Public university
- Established: 1949; 77 years ago
- Affiliations: Excellence League
- President: Gao Xiang (高翔)
- Faculty: 2,580 (Spring 2020)
- Undergraduates: 25,611 (Spring 2020)
- Postgraduates: 17,908 (Spring 2020)
- Location: Dalian, Liaoning, China
- Campus: Urban, 3.5713 km^{2} (1.3789 sq mi)
- Colors: Blue and White
- Website: dlut.edu.cn

Chinese name
- Simplified Chinese: 大连理工大学
- Traditional Chinese: 大連理工大學
Transcriptions
Standard Mandarin
- Hanyu Pinyin: Dàlián Lǐgōng Dàxué

University rankings
| BCUR National | Domestic | 28 |
| Wu Shulian National | Domestic | 34 |
| CUAA National | Alumni | 27 |
| QS National | General | 31 |
| THE National | General | 30–33 |
| QS Asia (Asia version) | General | 152 |
| THE Asia (Asia version) | General | 78 |
| ARWU World | Research | 151–200 |
| QS World | General | =482 |
| THE World | General | 401–500 |
| USNWR World | General | =261 |

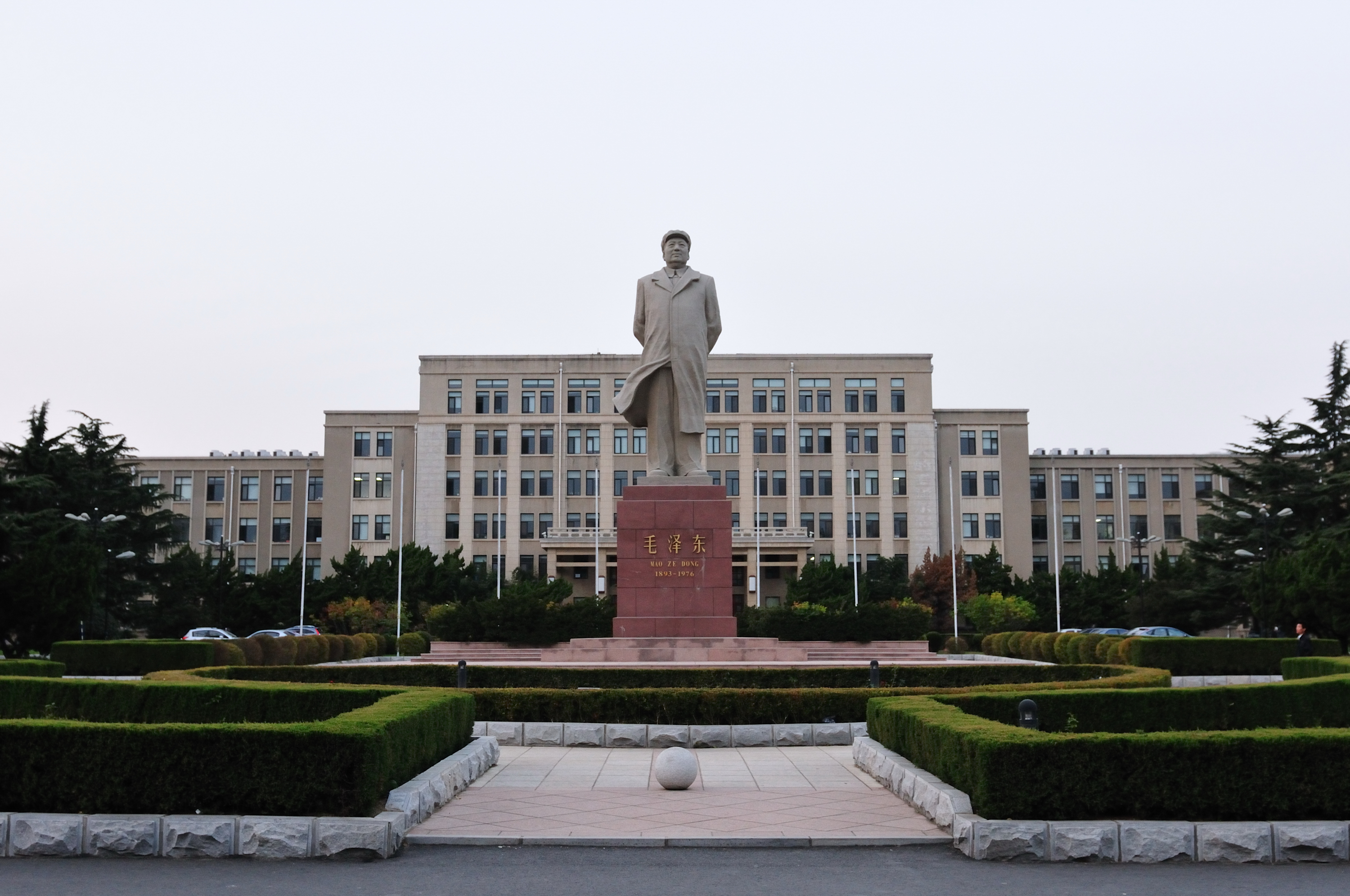
DUT Main Building

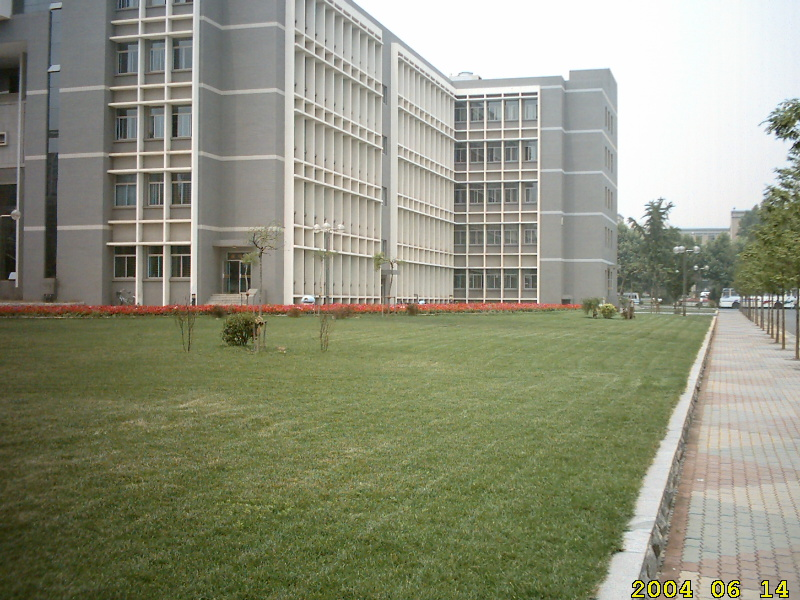
Bochuan Library, named after the founding president Qu Bochuan

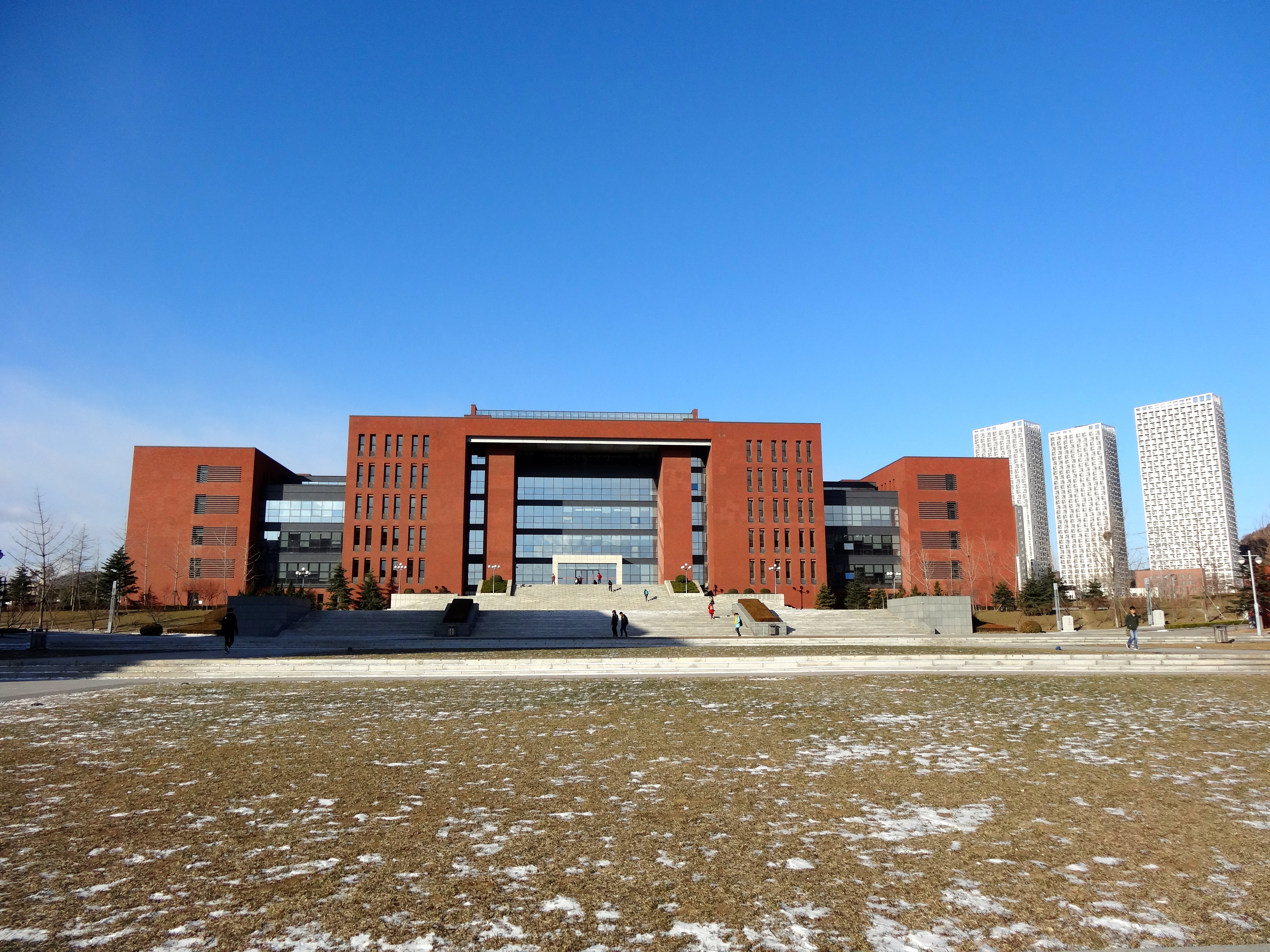
Lingxi Library, named after former president and academician, Qian Lingxi

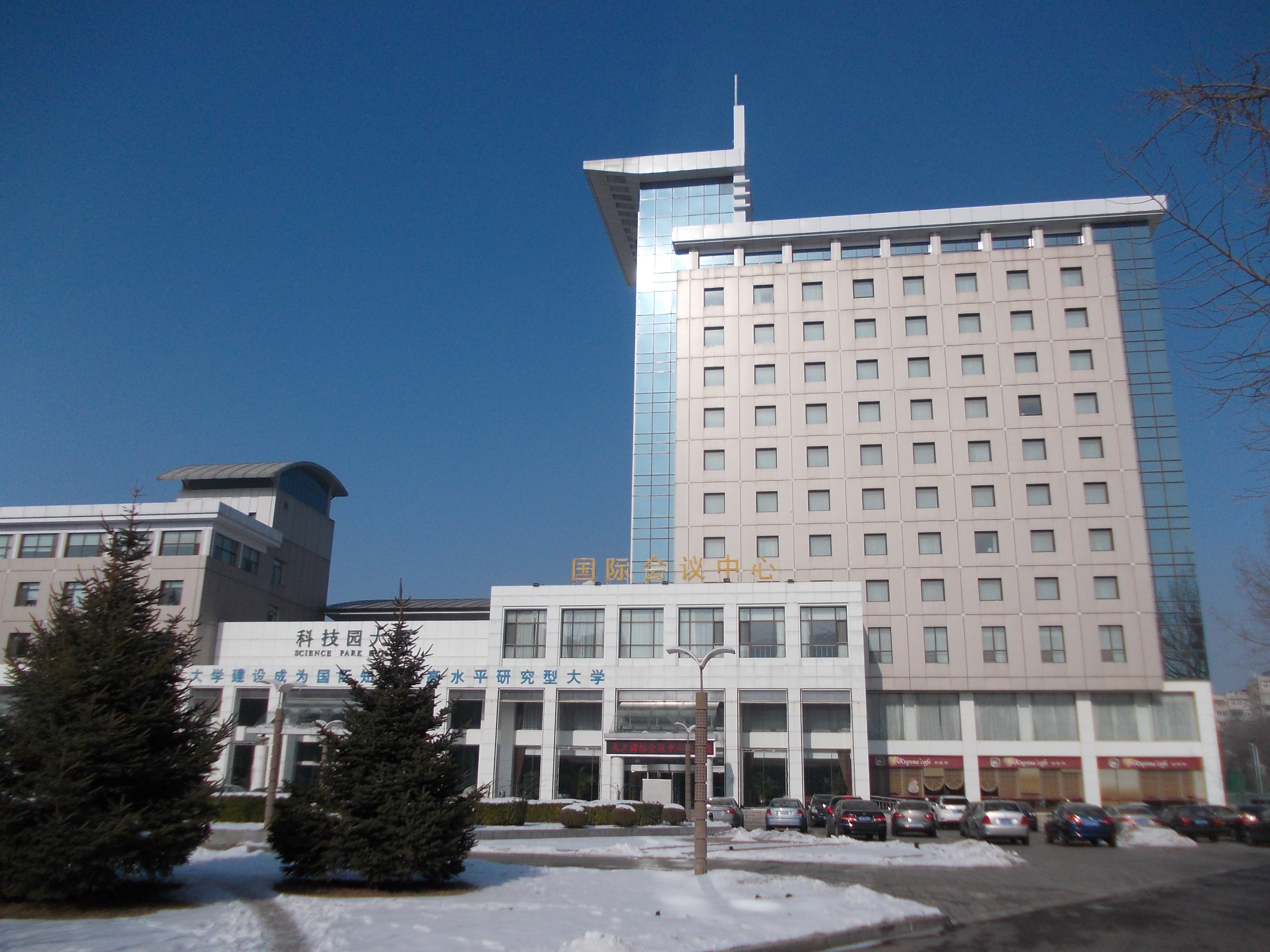
DUT International Convention Center

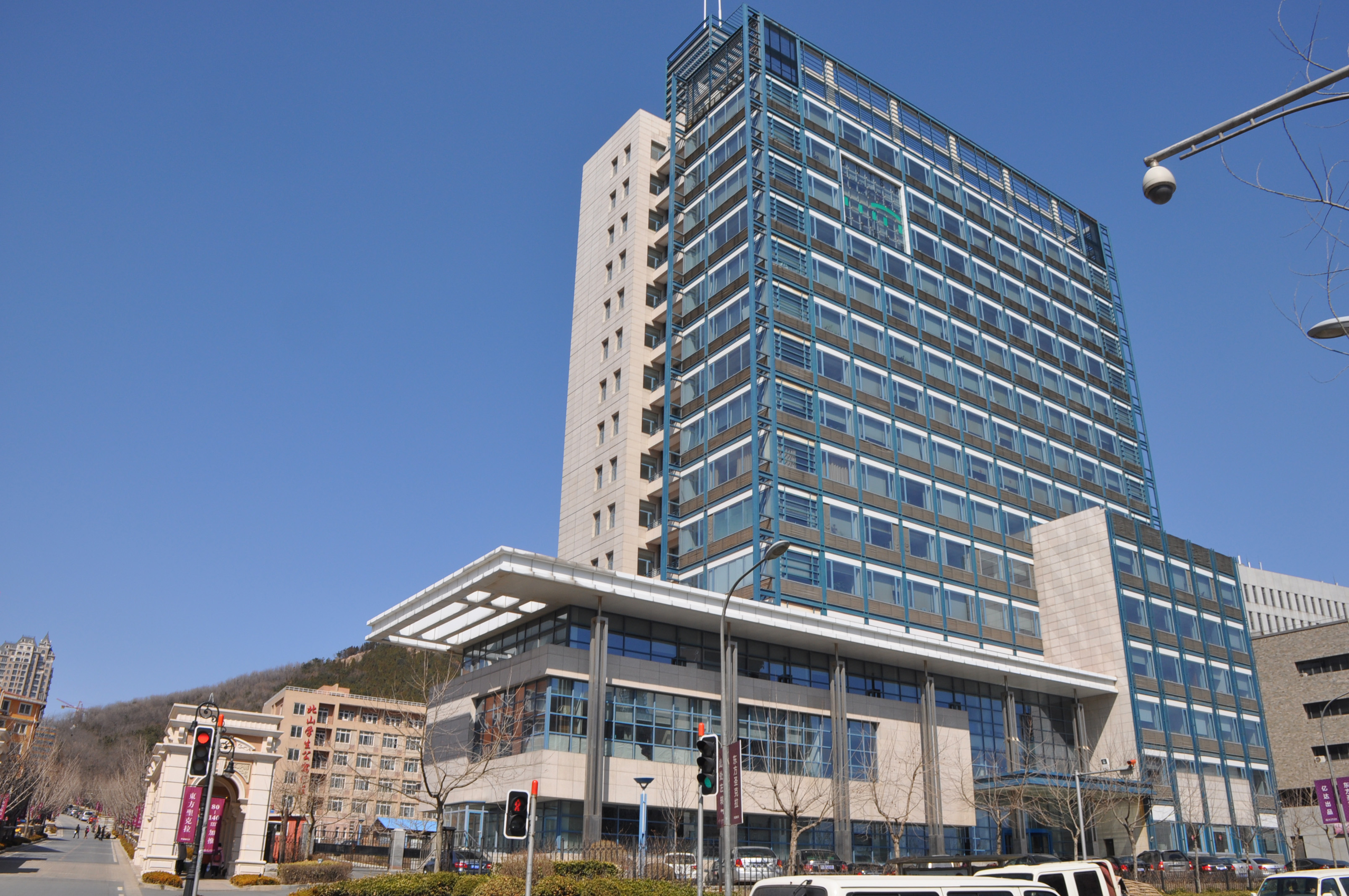
DUT Science Park B Building

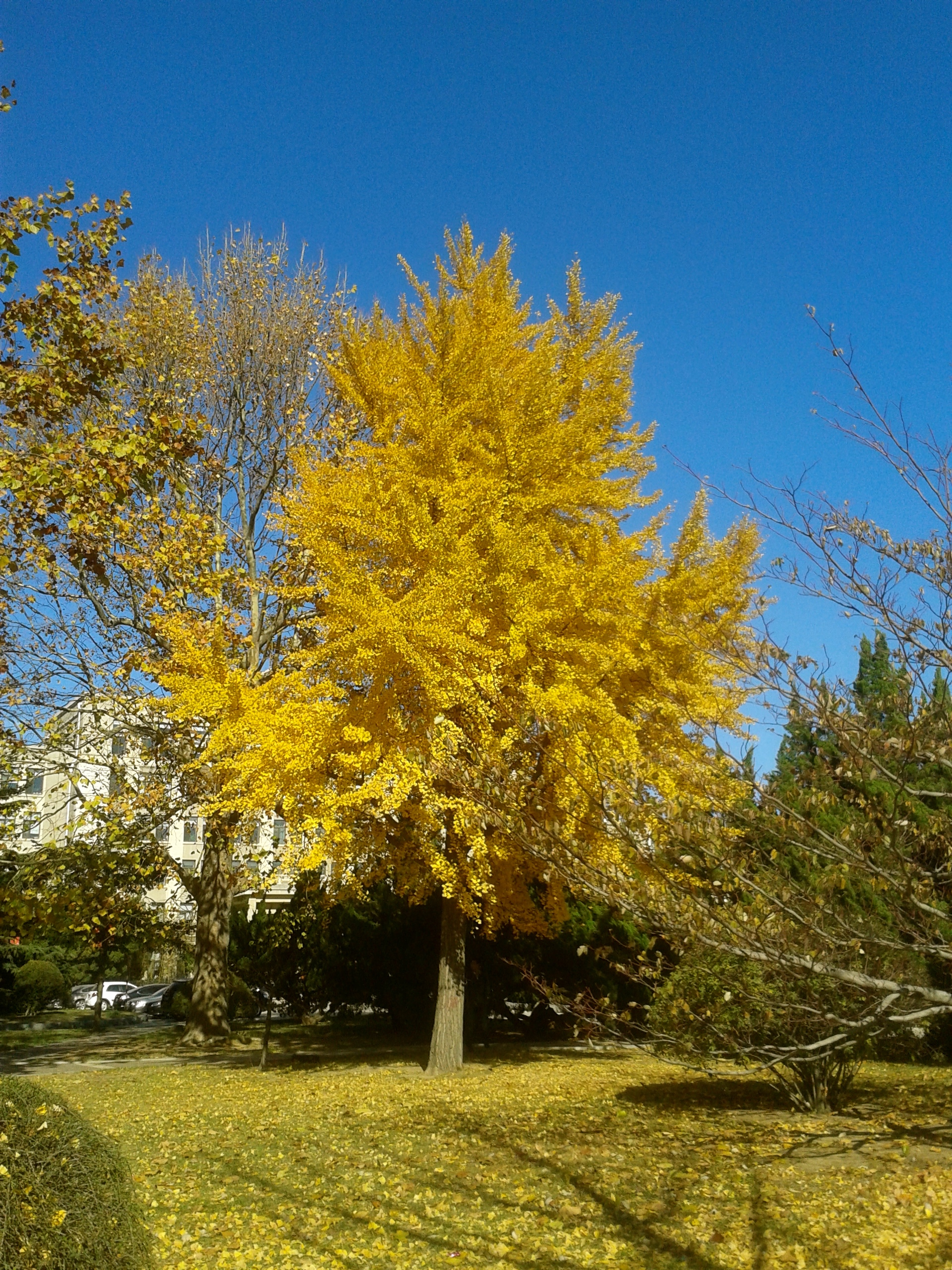
Autumn foliage in main campus

The Dalian University of Technology (DLUT) is a public university in Ganjingzi, Dalian, Liaoning, China. It is affiliated with the Ministry of Education. The university is part of Project 211, Project 985, and the Double First-Class Construction.

The university was initially founded in 1949. As of August 2021, 13 members of Chinese Academy of Sciences and members of Chinese Academy of Engineering in full-time faculty, 38 in part-time faculty, 1 foreign member of the Chinese Academy of Science, 1 member of Royal Swedish Academy of Engineering Sciences and 10 members of the Discipline Review Group of Academic Degrees Committee of the State Council are affiliated with DUT.

== History ==
In 2007, Intel, the Dalian municipal government, and the Dalian University of Technology jointly established the Dalian Institute of Semiconductor Technology. The new institute was managed by the Dalian University of Technology. Intel donated an 8-inch chip-producing assembly line to the university, with a total value of US$36 million.

== See also ==
- Dalian University of Technology Press
