= Borderland Humanities Research Laboratory of Nankai University =

Research institute at Nankai University (1942–1952)

- 南开大学边疆人文研究室
- Borderland Humanities Research Laboratory, Institute of Liberal Arts, College of Literature
- Established: 1942－1952
- Research type: Humanities research institute
- Directors: Tao Yunkui (1942 – 1944); Feng Wenqian (1944-1952)
- Location: Kunming, Yunnan (1942 – 1945); Tianjin (1945 – 1952)

The Borderland Humanities Research Laboratory of Nankai University (Chinese: 南开大学边疆人文研究室, romanized: Nánkāi Dàxué Biānjiāng Rénwén Yánjiūshì) formally known as the Borderland Humanities Research Laboratory of the Institute of Liberal Arts, College of Literature (Chinese: 南开大学文学院文科研究所边疆人文研究室, romanized: Nánkāi Dàxué Wénxuéyuàn Wénkē Yánjiūsuǒ Biānjiāng Rénwén Yánjiūshì), Nankai University, was established in 1942 during Nankai University's participation in the formation of the National Southwestern Associated University. The Laboratory was founded by the School of Literature, Nankai University as a research institution. The Laboratory adopted field investigation as its principal research method and followed Nankai University's educational principle of “understanding China and serving China”. The stated purpose of the Laboratory was “to conduct on-site investigation as its primary approach and to assist in the advancement of borderland education”. It provided social survey materials and reference documentation for the Yunnan Provincial Shifo Railway Preparatory Committee in support of railway construction. It also formed part of Nankai University's preparations for the continuation and development of its educational activities in the postwar period.

During the Second Sino-Japanese War, Nankai University relocated to Kunming, along with Peking University and Tsinghua University, where they jointly formed the National Southwestern Associated University. During this period, in connection with a plan by the Yunnan provincial government to construct a railway from Shiping County to Menghai County, Nankai University used related survey funding to establish the Borderland Humanities Research Laboratory to undertake associated investigations, while also expanding the School of Literature, Nankai University. The Laboratory published the journal Borderland Humanities, which carried reports and research articles based on its field investigations.

After the war, the National Southwestern Associated University was dissolved, and Nankai University returned to Tianjin; the Laboratory relocated there as well. After 1950, some members of the Laboratory left for other positions. Following the 1952 Tianjin Higher Education Department Adjustment, the School of Literature, Nankai University, was abolished, and the Laboratory's activities, including the publication of Borderland Humanities, came to an end.

In 2004, marking the centenary of Nankai School and the 85th anniversary of Nankai University, the Office for the Study of Nankai University History edited and published Years of the Associated University and Borderland Humanities, which documents the history of the Borderland Humanities Research Laboratory and includes a selection of previously published papers and memoirs.

== History ==
=== Background ===
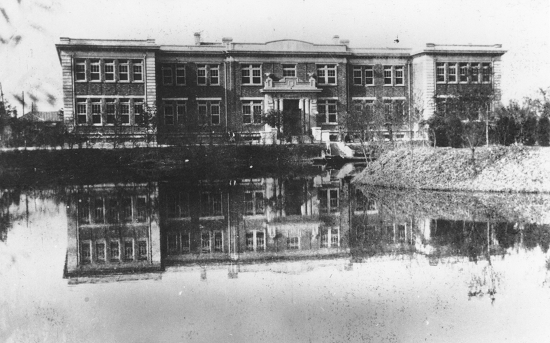
Xiushan Hall, donated by Li Chun, was once the office of the humanities departments of Nankai University.

In 1937, after the campus of Nankai University at Balitai was destroyed by Japanese bombing, Nankai University relocated southward, along with Peking University and Tsinghua University, and later jointly formed the National Southwestern Associated University. Before this relocation, each of the three universities had already established its own research institutions in the humanities and sciences. Peking University had an Institute of Liberal Arts, Tsinghua University operated a National Conditions Survey Institute under its Department of Sociology, and Nankai University had the Nankai Institute of Economics. Due to the war, research activities at the three universities were temporarily suspended. In 1938, the Ministry of Education (Taiwan) of the Nationalist Government supported qualified universities in resuming and developing research institutions. By June 1939, research activities at the three universities had begun to recover. In September 1939, Mei Yiqi convened a professors’ meeting and a university council, at which it was decided to establish the “Research Institute of the National Southwestern Associated University (Tsinghua, Peking, and Nankai)” to support research activities at the three institutions . During the war, although Nankai University operated jointly with Peking University and Tsinghua University, each institution retained its pre-existing administrative structure within the framework of the National Southwestern Associated University. In matters such as personnel appointments and research organization, the three universities continued to follow their previous regulations, thereby preserving their respective academic traditions and staffing systems.

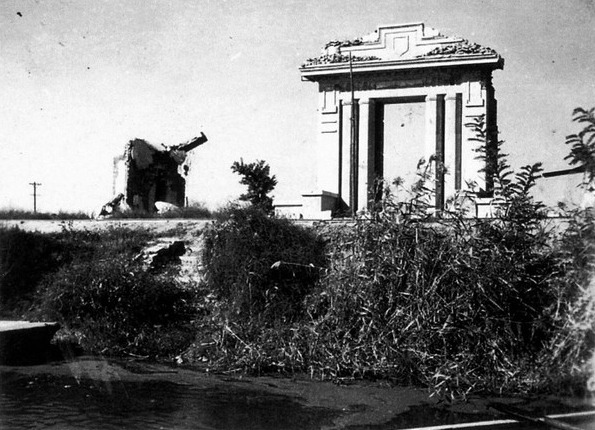
The ruins of Xiushan Hall at Nankai University after the bombing

Before the outbreak of the Second Sino-Japanese War, although Nankai University had established a College of Literature in 1929, it comprised only three departments—Foreign Languages, History, and Philosophy—and its academic scope remained limited. A proposed Institute of Liberal Arts had not yet been realized. Against this background, professors such as Huang Yusheng and Feng Wenqian continued to advocate that, once the war ended and the university returned to Tianjin, Nankai University should reestablish a more comprehensive College of Literature with strengthened teaching and research capacity, and proceed with the establishment of the planned Institute of Liberal Arts. In this context, the establishment of the Borderland Humanities Research Laboratory served multiple purposes. On the one hand, it provided social survey materials and reference documentation for the Yunnan Provincial Shifo Railway Preparatory Committee in support of railway construction. On the other hand, it formed part of Nankai University's preparations for the continuation and development of its educational activities in the postwar period. It functioned as a preparatory step toward the future establishment of an Institute of Liberal Arts. At the National Southwestern Associated University, Tsinghua University led the establishment of an Institute of Liberal Arts within its College of Literature. Subsequently, Nankai University also began planning to establish similar research institutions.

=== Establishment ===
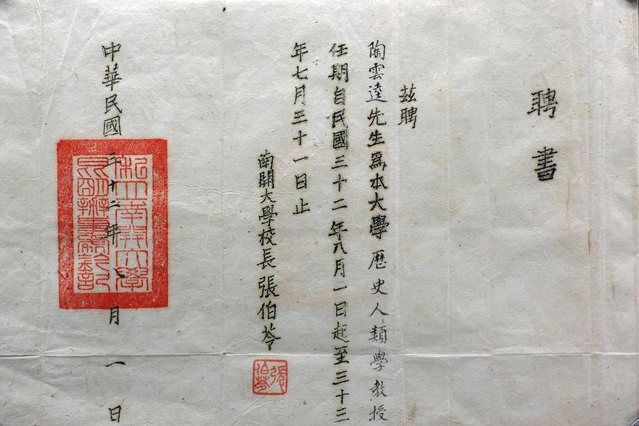
Letter of Appointment from Chang Po-ling, President of Nankai University, to Tao Yunkui

By the early 1940s, during the Second Sino-Japanese War, China's eastern seaboard had been blockaded by Japanese forces, and the Yunnan–Burma railway and Kunming–Haiphong railway became key routes linking China with the outside world. Under these circumstances, the Yunnan Provincial People's Government decided to construct a new railway from Shiping County in western Yunnan to Fohai near the border, connecting with the Kunming–Haiphong railway. The Shifo Railway Preparatory Committee allocated funding to commission academic institutions to conduct investigations along the proposed route, covering social and economic conditions, local customs, and linguistic and cultural practices, to support railway construction. After learning of this plan, Chang Po-ling wrote to his associate, Miao Yuntai, in Yunnan, seeking assistance. With Miao's support, the Yunnan provincial government subsequently entrusted Nankai University with this task.

On 28 April 1942, Gong Zhongjun, director of the Yunnan Provincial Department of Construction, sent a letter to Chang Po-ling proposing that Nankai University undertake field investigations along the proposed Shifo Railway route. Huang Yusheng and Feng Wenqian subsequently signed an agreement with the Yunnan authorities, under which Nankai University formally assumed responsibility for the survey work and received a dedicated grant of 30,000 yuan. After receiving funding from the Shifo Railway Preparatory Committee, Nankai University established the Borderland Humanities Research Laboratory to carry out the research. The Laboratory was intended to conduct investigations in support of railway construction and to provide a basis for the development of research in the humanities at the university. At its establishment, the Laboratory was small in scale, with fewer than 10 members and limited material resources. It was located in three rooms in the eastern wing of a courtyard outside the Xiaoximen gate of the National Southwestern Associated University campus. The western wing housed a history research institute established by Lei Haizong of the Department of History. Feng Wenqian handled supplies and logistical matters for graduate students.

In June 1942, following preparations by Huang Yusheng, Feng Wenqian and others, the Borderland Humanities Research Laboratory of Nankai University was formally established. At the same time, it issued its charter, Regulations of the Borderland Humanities Research Laboratory, School of Literature, Nankai University, which defined its scope as borderland humanities, its method as field investigation, and its purpose as assisting the development of borderland education. The Laboratory was headed by a director responsible for research and fieldwork, appointed by the university president from among faculty members recommended by the dean. Following the nomination, on 1 August 1942, Chang Po-ling appointed Tao Yunkui, a graduate of Nankai University who had studied in Germany, as professor of historical anthropology and director of the Laboratory.

=== Development ===
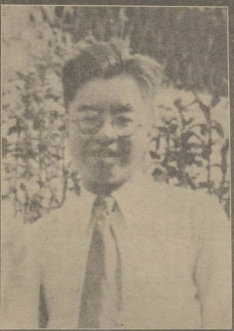
Tao Yunkui,the first director of the Frontier Humanities Research Center at Nankai University.

In May 1942, following the establishment of the Borderland Humanities Research Laboratory, Tao Yunkui served as its director and oversaw its overall operations. The Laboratory was organized into four groups: borderland languages, anthropology (including social and physical anthropology), human geography, and borderland education. At the time of its founding, most of the Laboratory's personnel were drawn from departments of the National Southwestern Associated University. Huang Yusheng, one of the founders, had previously served as secretary-general of Nankai University and concurrently as dean of the Normal College of the National Southwestern Associated University. Feng Wenqian was dean of the College of Literature at Nankai University and also a professor in the Department of Philosophy at the National Southwestern Associated University. At the same time, Tao Yunkui concurrently held a professorship in the Department of Sociology. On 6 July, recent graduates of the National Southwestern Associated University, Li Zongxian and Li Guobin, were appointed as investigators for the Laboratory. In August, Xing Gongwan joined the Laboratory, and shortly thereafter, Gao Huanian, a graduate student recommended by Luo Changpei, also became a member.Although the Laboratory gradually expanded in scale, the number of full-time researchers remained limited. Feng Wenqian held a nominal position but was primarily responsible for logistical and administrative tasks.

In 1943, Li Guobin was arrested by government troops in Cheli (present-day Xishuangbanna) during fieldwork and accused of collaboration; he was later released after intervention from multiple parties. On 30 December of the same year, Tao Yunkui contracted Relapsing fever that developed into Sepsis, and died on 26 January 1944 at the hospital of Yunnan University. Following Tao's death, Nankai University planned to appoint Rui Yifu, a researcher in the Institute of Social Sciences' ethnology section at Academia Sinica, as head of the Laboratory; he did not assume the post due to illness. Feng Wenqian subsequently took charge of the Laboratory. Between 1944 and 1945, Nankai University received two placements for study in France, and intended to send Li Guobin; he declined the opportunity and continued his research work. In 1945, after the end of the Second Sino-Japanese War, the National Southwestern Associated University was dissolved, and Nankai University returned to Tianjin. Except for Yuan Jiawa, who returned to Peking University, most members of the Laboratory relocated to Tianjin with Nankai University. After the university's return, the Laboratory was attached to the College of Literature without independent institutional status. With limited funding, its research activities were reduced. In 1947, the Laboratory issued volume 4 of Borderland Humanities, which included several academic articles.

=== Dissolution ===
In 1950, with the nationwide reorganization of the 1952 Tianjin Higher Education Department Adjustment, the Borderland Humanities Research Laboratory formally remained in name. However, its members gradually left for other positions and institutions. Several former researchers later became leading figures in Chinese linguistics. In the same year, Gao Huanian, then an associate professor at Nankai University, was invited by former Nankai University vice president and later Lingnan University president, Chen Xujing, to join Lingnan University (Guangzhou) as a researcher, where he continued his academic work. Feng Wenqian continued to engage in borderland studies and organized an exhibition of related cultural artifacts on the Nankai campus. However, these efforts did not alter the Laboratory's decline within the broader context of the 1952 Tianjin Higher Education Department Adjustment restructuring.

After the summer of 1952, Nankai University abolished its faculty-level administrative structure, and the School of Literature, Nankai University was dissolved. The Departments of Chinese Language and Literature and History within the college carried out the division and inventory of institutional property. As a result, the Borderland Humanities Research Laboratory and its journal Borderland Humanities formally ceased operations.

=== Aftermath ===
After the dissolution of the Borderland Humanities Research Laboratory, its publications, papers, and related materials were preserved in the Department of History, the library, the museum, and the archives of Nankai University. In 1953, Xing Gongwan went to teach at the Moscow Institute of Oriental Studies and Moscow State University. After returning to China, he resumed his position as professor in the Department of Chinese Language and Literature at Nankai University. During the Cultural Revolution, he was subjected to political criticism, and he later served as vice president of the Chinese Linguistic Society. Li Guobin remained at Nankai University and transferred to the Department of History, where he taught. He later served as director of the Nankai University Library. Li Zongxian taught history at Tianjin No. 1 High School and was later transferred to the Institute of Economics of the Tianjin Academy of Social Sciences, where he conducted research in population economics.

In May 2018, to mark the 80th anniversary of the founding of the National Southwestern Associated University, the Nankai University Museum held an exhibition titled “Clothing in Exile, Scholarship in Bloom”, showcasing archival ethnographic materials related to the National Southwestern Associated University. The exhibition included a large collection of documents from the Borderland Humanities Research Laboratory, such as official records, ethnic survey materials from the Shifo Railway region, surveys from the Sichuan–Kham region and the China–Myanmar border area, as well as field-collected artifacts, including objects such as ten-ring scissors and gilt bronze Buddha statues.

== Fieldwork and Research ==
The founders of the Borderland Humanities Research Laboratory at Nankai University, Huang Yusheng and Feng Wenqian, placed considerable trust in and emphasized younger scholars. As a result, the Laboratory's researchers were under 30, and the staff consisted primarily of early- and mid-career academics. The Laboratory remained small in scale and included members such as Tao YunkuiTao Yunkui, Li Guobin, Xing Gongwan, Gao Huanian, Li Zongxian, and Lai Caicheng. Under the direction of Tao Yunkui, the Laboratory was organized into four research groups: borderland languages, anthropology (including social and physical anthropology), human geography, and borderland education.

=== Field Investigations ===
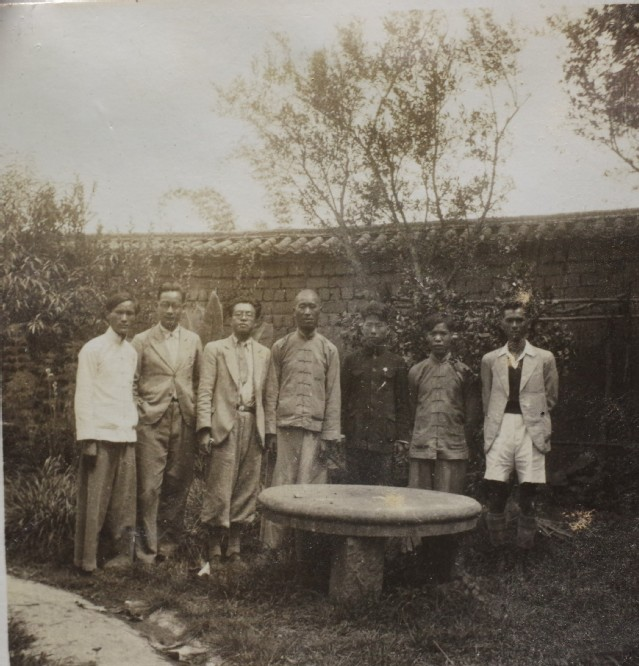
1942 Investigation Team of the Borderland Humanities Research Office of Nankai University

Among borderland research institutions in China in the 1940s, the Borderland Humanities Research Laboratory at Nankai University was noted for its field investigations. Its research teams conducted surveys across Yunnan Province. The fieldwork teams departed from Kunming and traveled through Yuxi, Eshan Yi Autonomous County, Xinping Yi and Dai Autonomous County, Yuanjiang Hani, Yi and Dai Autonomous County, and Jinping Miao, Yao, and Dai Autonomous County, continuing along the Red River (Asia). They conducted investigations among ethnic groups in the region, including the Hani people of the Honghe Hani and Yi Autonomous Prefecture, the Yi people, the Miao people of Wenshan, the Dai people, and the Nasu people, focusing on language, customs, social and economic conditions, and geography. Tao Yunkui, Li Guobin, and Li Zongxian mainly researched social, economic, ethnographic, and geographical aspects. At the same time, linguistic studies were primarily carried out by Xing Gongwan and Gao Huanian.In December 1947, the Laboratory published a report titled "Survey Work Report of the Borderland Humanities Research Laboratory of Nankai University " in its journal Borderland Humanities, documenting its field investigations from 1942 to 1945:

From June to August 1942, Xing Gongwan led surveys of the Zhongjia language in Huishui, Guizhou, and the Zhongjia language in Luoping County, Yunnan. From July to October of the same year, Li Guobin led investigations into the geographical environment of the Dai area in Yuanjiang, Yunnan, the distribution and migration legends of the Akha, Tao Yunkui studied the social organization and religious practices of the Nasu in Luguishan, Xinping, and the totemic system of the Heiyi in Dazhai, Xinping, Gao Huanian studied the Woni language in Liuluhe, Xinping, and the Nasu language and writing system in Qingkuishan, and Li Zongxian examined Han–ethnic trade relations through the study of the market in Yangwu, Xinping. From January to July 1943, Xing Gongwan conducted fieldwork on the Hua Yao Dai language in Mosa, the Shui Dai language in Yuanjiang, and the Red Lolo language in Sanmatou, Yuanjiang. From January to November of the same year, Li Guobin studied the relationship between tea and various ethnic groups in Cehli. Between August and November, Yuan Jiawa investigated the Woni language in Eshan, while Gao Huanian studied the Qing Miao language in Huanian, Eshan. From July to September 1945, Gao Huanian conducted fieldwork on the White Lolo language in Lunan.

=== Research Output ===
The research outputs of the Borderland Humanities Research Laboratory can be divided into two categories. One consists of materials produced in support of the Shifo Railway project, and the other comprises field reports and academic papers based on investigations conducted in areas such as Xinping, Yuanjiang, and Luoping in Yunnan Province.

Materials produced under the commission of the Shifo Railway project were compiled and published under the joint name of the Yunnan Shifo Railway Preparatory Committee and the Borderland Humanities Research Laboratory of Nankai University. These included Tables of the Distribution of Minority Languages along the Shifo Railway Route, A Language Manual for Railway Personnel, and Report on the Social and Economic Conditions along the Shifo Railway. The field investigations conducted by the Borderland Humanities Research Laboratory along the Shifo Railway route in Yunnan lasted for more than ten months. They represented one of the early, large-scale, long-term interdisciplinary surveys of borderland regions in southwest China and produced a substantial body of research materials. Nankai University president Chang Po-ling described the reports as “detailed in content and extensive in scope”.

The field reports and academic studies produced in Xinping, Yuanjiang, and Luoping in Yunnan resulted in several monographs and collaborative works. Li Guobin authored A Survey of the Geographical Environment of the Dai in the Upper Reaches of the Red River, The Dai of Yuanjiang and Their Geographical Environment, and A Survey of the Tea Economy and Interethnic Relations in Cehli and Fohai.Tao Yunkui and Li Zongxian jointly produced A Survey of Han–Ethnic Trade in Yangwu Market Town, A Study of Han and Indigenous Market Relations in Yangwu, and A Survey of Nasu Religion and Witchcraft. Xing Gongwan wrote A Survey of the Zhongjia Language in Luoping, Phonetic Records of Songs from Yuanyangzhai, and Physical Characteristics of the Sani and Axi Peoples of Yunnan. Gao Huanian authored Grammar of the Heiyi Language, Witchcraft among the Lolo of Luguishan, A Study of the Woni Language in Xinping, and Language and Writing of the Nasu of Luguishan. Tao Yunkui also wrote Social Organization and Religion of the Nasu of Luguishan.

In 1942, Gao Huanian published the article A Study of the Heiyi Language in Kunming, which was structured into sections on loanwords, grammar, phonology, and vocabulary. The study later received an academic award from the Ministry of Education (Taiwan) of the Nationalist Government of the Republic of China. In 1943, Tao Yunkui published Chicken-Bone Divination among Southwestern Ethnic Groups in Borderland Humanities. The article drew attention from scholars, including Wen Yiduo and Luo Changpei, and was described by Luo as “comprehensive in scope and rich in interpretation”.

== Academic journal ==
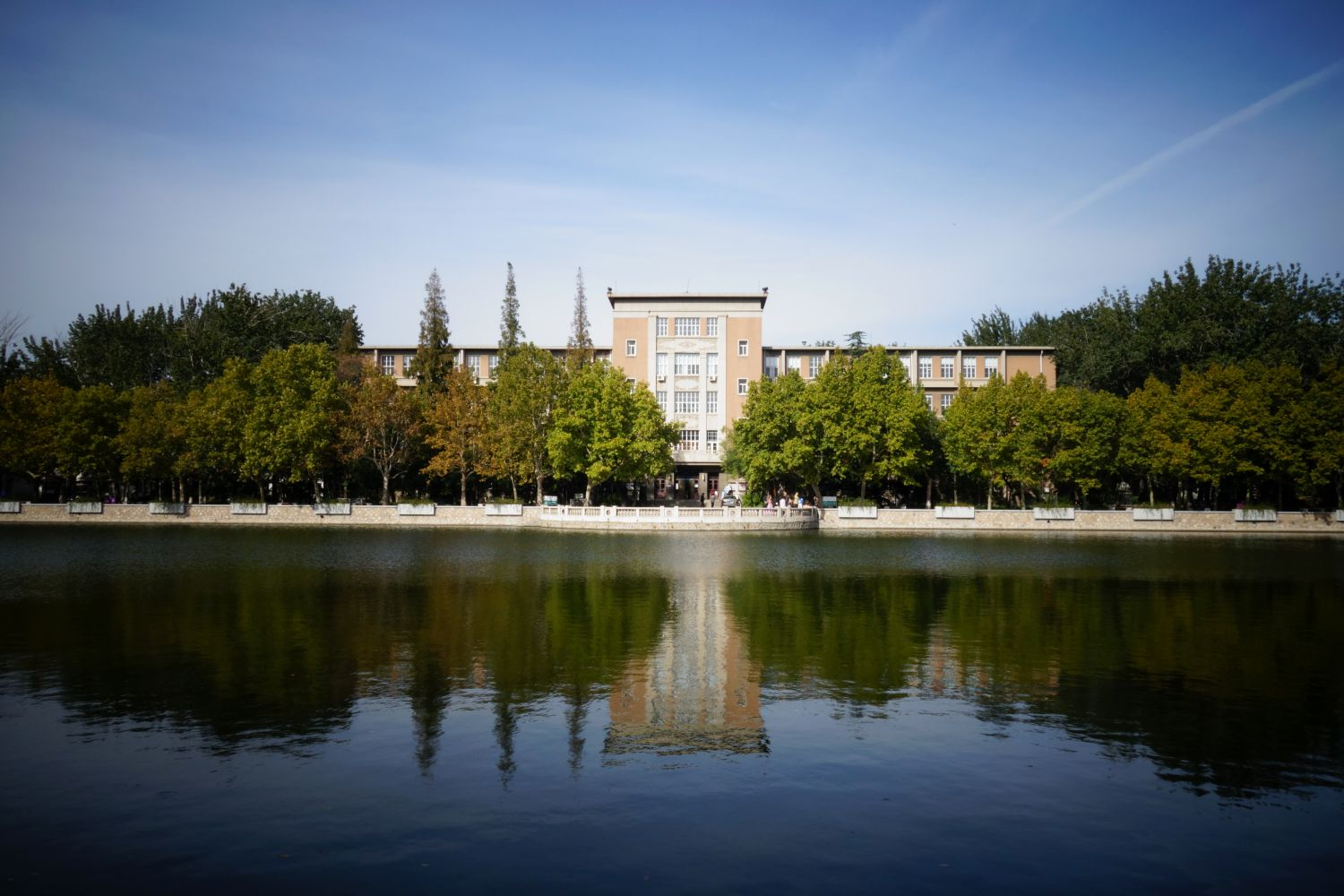
The library of Nankai University has a collection of old publications of "Borderland Humanities"

The Borderland Humanities Research Laboratory of Nankai University published the academic journal Borderland Humanities to disseminate the results of its field investigations and research. In total, four volumes comprising nineteen issues were produced. Due to printing constraints at the time, the journal was mimeographed. The journal was issued in two series: Series A, a special publication on linguistic anthropology, and Series B, a general bimonthly periodical. Series A comprised three issues, including Phonetic Records of Zhong Songs from Yuanyangzhai by Xing Gongwan, and Grammar of the Heiyi Language and A Study of Chinese Loanwords in the Heiyi Language by Gao Huanian. Series B consisted of three volumes with a total of sixteen issues. Publication reached the combined third and fourth issues of volume 3, after which, following the end of the Second Sino-Japanese War and the return of Nankai University to Tianjin, the Laboratory also relocated. After the 1950 reorganization of the Tianjin Higher Education Department Adjustment, during which the School of Literature, Nankai University was dissolved, the Laboratory and the publication Borderland Humanities continued only briefly before ceasing. In addition to academic publications, Xing Gongwan also published a novel titled The Moon over the Red River, which depicted aspects of social life in the borderland region.

After the dissolution of the Borderland Humanities Research Laboratory, its publications were preserved in the Nankai University Library. Because most materials were mimeographed and contained a large number of characters from minority languages, some portions are difficult to read.Despite these limitations, the publications continue to be used as sources for research. Their contents cover topics such as the natural and human environment, overviews of minority cultures and daily life, languages and cultures of ethnic groups in the southwest borderlands, cultural anthropology, and physical anthropology, and provide material for the study of the political, economic, and cultural conditions of southwest China.

In 2004, when the Nankai University Office for the Study of University History edited and published The Years of the National Southwestern Associated University and Borderland Humanities, a document titled "Inventory of Borderland Humanities Materials " was found in a storage area of the Department of History. The volume also compiled memoirs related to the Borderland Humanities Research Laboratory, along with a selection of previously published papers. Copies of Borderland Humanities are currently held in the collections of the Nankai University Library.

== Funding ==
The Borderland Humanities Research Laboratory of Nankai University was established during the wartime period. Its initial funding was provided by a commission from the Yunnan Shifo Railway Preparatory Committee, which entrusted Nankai University with conducting investigations into the social and economic conditions, local customs, and linguistic and cultural characteristics along the proposed railway route.On 28 April 1942, Gong Zhongjun, then director of the Yunnan Provincial Department of Construction, formally approved an allocation of 30,000 yuan in a letter to Chang Po-ling . In 1945, Yuan Jiawa conducted a linguistic survey in Shilin Yi Autonomous County with financial support provided by the local government. There is no confirmed evidence regarding whether the Laboratory received funding from the Ministry of Education (Taiwan) of the Nationalist Government of the Republic of China.

== See also ==
- History of Nankai University
- Nankai University Institute of Economics, Northeast Research Association of Nankai University
- School of Literature, Nankai University
