= Jinnancun =

Village in Chongqing, China

Jinnancun (Chinese: 津南村; pinyin: Jīnnáncūn) is a village in Chongqing Nankai Middle School, which was first built in 1936.

People including Zhang Boling (张伯苓), Liu Yazi (柳亚子) and Weng Wenhao (翁文灏) once had lived here, while Mao Zedong, Zhou Enlai, Chiang Kai-shek, Chiang Ching-kuo, Guo moruo and Ma Yinchu (马寅初) had been here before to visit their friends.
