= Nankai High School =

Nankai High School may refer to:

- Tianjin Nankai High School
- Chongqing Nankai Secondary School

== See also ==
- Nankai. a family of schools in China
