= Nankai University Library =

Academic library in Tianjin, China

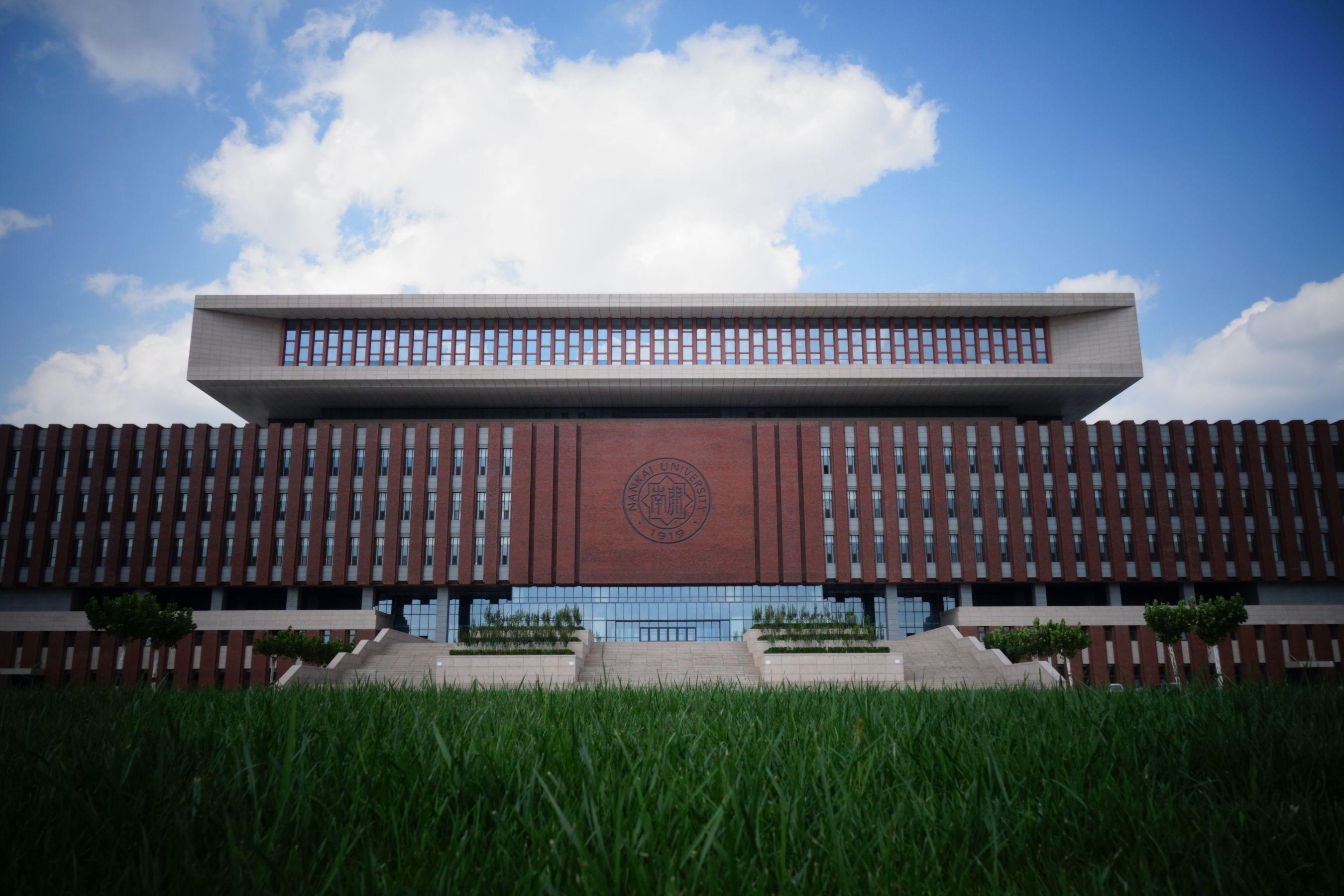
- Nankai University Jinnan Campus Center Hall
- Location: ChinaTianjinNankai, Tianjin、Jinnan, Tianjin、Binhai, Tianjin, China
- Type: Academic library
- Scope: Higher Education and Research Services
- Established: 1919年
- Branches: 4

Collection
- Items collected: Books, journals, electronic journals, e-books, dissertations, ancient books, database resources
- Size: 4.3148 million copies

Other information
- Website: lib.nankai.edu.cn

The Nankai University Library, established in 1919, is one of the earliest private university libraries in China. In the same year, educators Yan Xiu and Zhang Boling founded Nankai University as a private institution, and the library was planned and built alongside the university as a key academic support unit and center for documentary and information services. In 1927, the bibliophile Lu Jing funded the construction of the “Muzhai Library,” which laid the foundation for the university's early library system; however, it was destroyed by Japanese artillery fire following the Marco Polo Bridge Incident in 1937. During the Second Sino-Japanese War, Nankai University relocated to Kunming together with Peking University and Tsinghua University to form the National Southwestern Associated University, where the three institutions jointly established the “Lianda Library.” After Nankai resumed operations in 1946, the library was rebuilt and continued to develop.

At present, the Nankai University Library consists of the Wenzhong Library, the Yifu Library, the Economics Branch Library, and the Central Library at the Jinnan Campus, with a total floor area of approximately 74,695 square meters and 5,188 reading seats. Among these, the Central Library was completed in 2015, the Wenzhong Library was built in 1958, the Yifu Library in 1990, and the Economics Branch Library was incorporated into the main system in 1999. The library has developed into a comprehensive literature and information service system covering the Balitai, Jinnan, and TEDA campuses.

== Historical Evolution ==
From its founding in 1919, the Nankai University Library served as the university's primary repository of books and academic materials. Yan Xiu, a member of the university's board, donated a total of US$2,000 for book purchases and also contributed dozens of rare classical works, including the Twenty-Four Histories and the Nine Tong (comprehensive institutional histories), thereby laying the foundation for the library's early collection.

In its initial stage, Nankai University was located at the southern end of Nankai Middle School, where university classes were held in a lecture building. The university library was housed in one of the classrooms within this building.

In 1927, Lu Muzhai donated funds to Nankai University to build the Muzhai Library, which was the predecessor of Nankai University Library.

After the end of the Second Sino-Japanese War and the resumption of Nankai University, a library building was constructed at the Balitai campus in Tianjin in 1958, later known as the “Old Library.” In 1985, a new library building was constructed, referred to as the “New Library,” which was later named the Shaw Library.

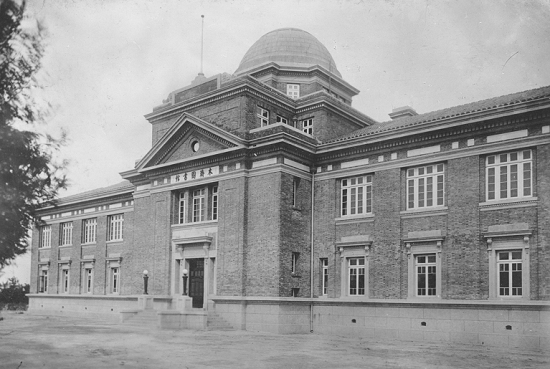
The Muzhai Library donated by Lu Muzhai to the private Nankai University

On November 17, 1994, Tianjin Institute of Foreign Trade was merged into Nankai University, and its library was incorporated into the Nankai University Library system.[1] In June 1996, the library of the Yingkoudao (Yingshuidao) campus was merged into the main library and renamed the “Yingshuidao Campus Branch Library of Nankai University Library.”

In 1999, the Information Center of the School of Economics at Nankai University was renamed the “Economics and Management Branch Library of Nankai University Library.”

In 2015, with the opening of the Jinnan Campus of Nankai University, the Jinnan Campus Library was completed as a landmark building of the new campus.

In 2018, Nankai University alumnus Zhang Wenzhong donated RMB 100 million to the university, of which RMB 80 million was used to establish the Wenzhong Fund for purposes including the renovation of the science library. On May 22, 2019, the Science Library of Nankai University was officially renamed the Wenzhong Library.

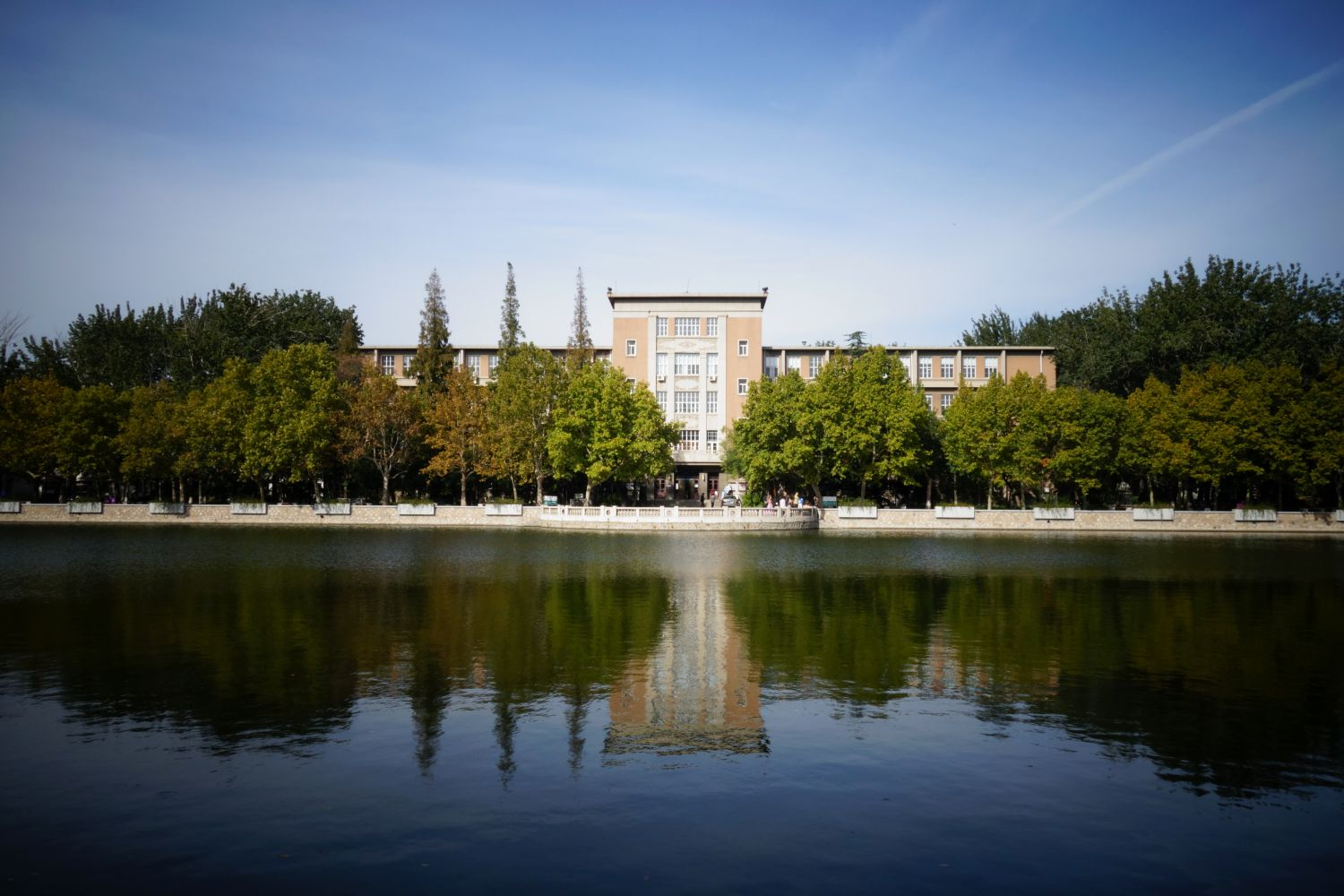
Nankai University Wenzhong Library (Science Library)

== Ancient book restoration ==
The Jinnan Campus Library houses the Nankai University Workshop for the Transmission of Ancient Book Restoration Techniques, which was established in October 2020. It is one of five such workshops designated among universities nationwide. In November 2021, the workshop completed its first restoration project, Lin Songhe’s Manuscripts.

== See also ==
- Nankai University Museum
