= Wei Junyi =

Chinese writer, editor and memoirist (1917–2002)

- 韦君宜
- Born: Wei Zhenyi (魏蓁一); 26 October 1917; Beijing, China
- Died: 26 January 2002 (aged 84); Beijing, China
- Education: Tsinghua University
- Occupations: Writer, editor, publisher
- Spouse: Yang Shu (m. 1941; died 1980)
- Children: Yang Tuan
- Writing career
- Notable work: Sitong lu (1998)

Wei Junyi (simplified Chinese: 韦君宜; traditional Chinese: 韋君宜; pinyin: Wéi Jūnyí; 26 October 1917 – 26 January 2002), born Wei Zhenyi (魏蓁一), was a Chinese writer, magazine editor and publisher. A participant in the December 9th Movement of 1935 who joined the Chinese Communist Party (CCP) as a student and travelled to Yan'an in 1939, she spent most of her career within the party's cultural apparatus, serving as editor-in-chief and later director of the People's Literature Publishing House.

She is best known for Sitong lu (思痛录, variously rendered as A Record of Painful Thoughts or Record of Sorrow), a memoir written over some two decades and published in 1998, four years before her death. Unlike most Chinese memoirs of the Mao era, it begins not with the Anti-Rightist Campaign of 1957 or the Cultural Revolution but with the "Rescue the Fallen" campaign of 1943 in Yan'an, and it treats the author as an agent as well as a victim of the campaigns it describes.

== Early life and education ==
Wei was born in Beijing on 26 October 1917 into a prosperous family with ancestral roots in Jianshi County, Hubei. Her father had studied in Japan in the closing years of the Qing dynasty and worked in the Beiping railway administration after returning to China. She attended Nankai High School in Tianjin, where she first encountered left-wing literature, and in the autumn of 1934 entered the department of philosophy at Tsinghua University in Beiping.

She joined the student patriotic movement almost immediately. In December 1935 she took part in the December 9th Movement and edited the Tsinghua Weekly. She joined the CCP in May 1936; some sources give 1935. She later wrote that resistance to the Japanese invasion was the immediate reason she became a Communist, a choice she described as typical of her student generation.

== War years and Yan'an ==
After the Marco Polo Bridge Incident of July 1937 Wei abandoned her studies and returned to Hubei to work in the CCP underground. In October 1938, shortly before the fall of Wuhan, she left the city; en route she learned that her fiancé Sun Shishi, a fellow Tsinghua student and party member, had been killed in a Japanese air raid at the age of twenty. The loss marked her deeply, and she returned to it in her writing decades later.

In late 1938 the party arranged her passage to Yan'an by way of Xi'an; she arrived early in 1939. There she worked for the Central Youth Committee and edited the magazine China Youth, publishing short stories including "The Dragon" and "Three Friends". In 1941 she married Yang Shu (杨述), another Tsinghua classmate and December 9th activist.

=== The Rescue Campaign, 1943 ===
During the "Rescue the Fallen" phase of the Yan'an Rectification Movement in 1943, Yang Shu was accused of being a Kuomintang agent and detained for investigation. Wei campaigned for his exoneration; her infant daughter died during this period. She watched large numbers of colleagues and friends denounced as traitors and spies, and later recorded the interrogation logic cadres openly avowed at the time — assume guilt first, supply the confession, then apply pressure. The year became the starting point of a lifetime of reflection, and supplied both the opening chapter of Sitong lu and the core of her autobiographical novel Lusha's Road.

== Career in the People's Republic ==
During the Chinese Civil War Wei moved to the Jin-Cha-Ji base area and took part in land reform work.

After 1949 she was deputy head of the propaganda department of the Communist Youth League and editor-in-chief of China Youth; she then served as deputy secretary of the cultural committee of the Beijing municipal party committee. In 1954 she transferred to the China Writers Association as editor-in-chief of the journal Literary Study (文艺学习), and in early 1959 became deputy editor-in-chief of People's Literature. In 1960 she moved to the Writers' Publishing House, later merged into the People's Literature Publishing House, where she rose through deputy editor-in-chief and editor-in-chief to deputy director and finally director, retiring in 1986.

As a publisher she backed works that later won the Mao Dun Literature Prize, including Mo Yingfeng's The General's Chant and Zhang Jie's Heavy Wings, and in 1985 founded the Literary Story Newspaper.

== Cultural Revolution and later years ==
Wei was attacked as a "capitalist roader" during the Cultural Revolution. Yang Shu suffered considerably worse persecution and was rehabilitated only late in life; he died in 1980.

In April 1986 Wei suffered a cerebral haemorrhage that left her paralysed on the right side, and she spent her remaining years largely bedridden, continuing to write and revise. On 25 November 1997 more than twenty writers and intellectuals, among them Yu Guangyuan, Shao Yanxiang, Wang Meng and Zhang Jie, gathered for her eightieth birthday and undertook to help bring Sitong lu into print.

She died at Peking Union Medical College Hospital in Beijing on 26 January 2002, aged 84. A memorial ceremony for the gravestones of Yang Shu and Wei Junyi was held in Beijing on 30 September 2003.

== Sitong lu ==
=== Composition and publication ===
According to her daughter Yang Tuan, Wei began the memoir in the later years of the Cultural Revolution, completing twelve of its seventeen sections before her stroke and finishing the remaining five, together with extensive revision, while disabled — a process spanning roughly two decades. Because of the sensitivity of the material the manuscript could not be published as a whole for many years, and individual chapters appeared piecemeal in periodicals.

Sitong lu was published in May 1998 by the Beijing October Literature and Art Publishing House. At the end of 2000 Tiandi Books of Hong Kong issued an expanded edition incorporating additional material. In December 2012 the People's Literature Publishing House published an expanded memorial edition, collating the mainland and Hong Kong texts and adding twenty-two of Wei's commemorative essays, together with a short biography and Yang Tuan's account of the book's genesis as appendices. A five-volume Collected Works of Wei Junyi followed in April 2013.

=== Content ===
The book proceeds chronologically, with sections on the Yan'an "Rescue the Fallen" campaign, the early campaigns of the 1950s, the Anti-Hu Feng Campaign, the Anti-Rightist Campaign, the Great Leap Forward, the Anti-Right Deviation Campaign and the Cultural Revolution. Free-standing chapters include "The Tragedy of a Contemporary", on her husband; "An Editor's Confession"; and a portrait of the cultural official Zhou Yang. The expanded edition adds essays commemorating Feng Xuefeng, Hu Yaobang and others.

=== Themes ===
Commentators have located the book's importance less in the rarity of its facts than in the starting point, depth and self-implicating character of its reflection.

- Tracing the problem back to 1943. Most comparable memoirs begin in 1957 or 1966. By opening with the Rescue Campaign, Wei directs her criticism at the mechanics of campaign politics themselves rather than at the failures of a particular period. She argued in the book that the Cultural Revolution did not fall from the sky but ripened over the preceding decade, beginning with the Anti-Rightist Campaign.
- Victim and participant. Wei declines to write purely as a sufferer, acknowledging that she also carried out campaigns against others. The chapter "An Editor's Confession" examines the harm she did to writers and manuscripts as a journal editor and publishing executive. Zhang Lingxia reads the memoir as showing repeatedly that such persecutions were produced by the combined action of many ordinary individuals pushing the victim into the abyss.
- The collapse of trust. The book records that the cases of Li Xinghua and Xi Zhongxun around 1959 shook her more than the Yan'an rectification had, showing her that suspicion extended well beyond cadres of intellectual background; once any literary work could be labelled anti-party, she observed, the scope for fabricating charges became effectively unlimited.
- Return from official to intellectual. Wang Peiyuan argues that where others with similar histories were recounting their grievances, Wei wrote instead to record suffering and interrogate human conduct; her later work has the character of a spiritual autobiography, tracking the long conflict between a cultural official's party discipline and an intellectual's conscience.
- Acknowledged limits. Wei states in the book that it cannot say everything, and that she lacks the theoretical framework for a systematic analysis, leaving that work to later writers.

=== Reception ===
Wang Peiyuan describes Sitong lu as a landmark in the spiritual history of twentieth-century Chinese intellectuals and an irreplaceable cultural document. Zhang Lingxia places the book within a broader effort by Chinese intellectuals to recover their own dignity. Its publication prompted considerable discussion, and a later volume, Responding to Wei Junyi, collected excerpts from the memoir together with several dozen critical essays.

== Other writing ==
Wei's fiction draws largely on her revolutionary career and on the situation of intellectuals within it. The novella Baptism (洗礼), about an old cadre's self-examination after the Cultural Revolution, won a national prize for novellas and is often read as a fictional rehearsal of the themes of Sitong lu. Lusha's Road follows its protagonist from the student movement of the 1930s to the Yan'an rectification, and functions as a counterpart to the memoir: the novel changes the names but keeps the events, while the memoir names names. Her essays consist mainly of portraits of the dead, written in a plain style.

== Personal life ==
Wei's husband, Yang Shu (born Yang Deji), was a Tsinghua classmate and a leader of the December 9th Movement who later headed the propaganda department of the Communist Youth League and directed the China Youth Daily. Accused of espionage in 1943 and persecuted again during the Cultural Revolution, he died in 1980.

Their daughter Yang Tuan prepared her mother's manuscripts for publication and wrote an account of the memoir's composition.

== Selected works ==
- Sitong lu 思痛录 (memoir), 1998; expanded Hong Kong edition 2000; expanded memorial edition 2012
- Mu yu zi 母与子 (Mother and Son), novel
- Lusha de lu 露沙的路 (Lusha's Road), novel
- Xili 洗礼 (Baptism), novella
- Nüren ji 女人集 (Women), short fiction
- Lao ganbu bie zhuan 老干部别传, short fiction
- Jiu meng nan wen 旧梦难温, short fiction
- Si shui liu nian 似水流年, essays
- Guguo qing 故国情, essays
- Haishang fanhua meng 海上繁华梦, essays
- Wo dui nianqing ren shuo 我对年轻人说, essays
- Collected Works of Wei Junyi 韦君宜文集, 5 vols., 2013
