= Li Wenhua =

Li Wenhua may refer to:

- Li Wenhua (ecologist) (Chinese: 李文華; 1932–2022), Chinese ecologist
- Li Wen-hua (Chinese: 李文華; born 1989), Taiwanese discus thrower
- Wen-Hwa Lee (Chinese: 李文華; born 1950), Taiwanese molecular biologist
- Li Wenhua (film director and politician) (born 1929), film director and politician
