= Borderland Humanities =

- Discipline: Ethnology, Anthropology, Linguistics
- Language: Chinese language
- Edited by: Tao Yunkui（editor-in-chief）

Publication details
- History: 1942－1950
- Publisher: Nankai University and the Borderland Humanities Research Laboratory
- Frequency: Bimonthly (Type B)
- ISO 4: Find out here

- See also

Borderland Humanities was an academic journal published by the Borderland Humanities Research Office of Nankai University from 1942 to 1950. It was founded and directed by anthropologist and ethnologist Tao Yunkui, and served as an important scholarly platform for frontier studies in China during the Second Sino-Japanese War and the early postwar period.

== History ==
In 1942, following the establishment of the Borderland Humanities Research Office at Nankai University, the academic journal Frontier Humanities was launched. The publication was issued in two series: Series A, a monographic series on linguistic anthropology, and Series B, a comprehensive bimonthly journal. Series A produced three issues in total: the first was Xing Gongwan's A Phonetic Record of Zhong Songs in Yuanyangzhai, while the second and third were Gao Huanian's Grammar of the Hei Yi Language and A Study of Chinese Loanwords in the Hei Yi Language, respectively.

Series B, the comprehensive journal, published three volumes comprising a total of sixteen issues. By the time the combined Issues 3–4 of Volume 3 were released, the Second Sino-Japanese War had ended, and Nankai University had relocated back to Tianjin, with the Borderland Humanities Research Office returning as well.

In 1950, during the nationwide reorganization of 1952 Tianjin Higher Education Department Adjustment, the college of School of Literature, Nankai University was dissolved. The activities of the Borderland Humanities Research Office, along with the publication of Borderland Humanities, continued only for a brief period before coming to an end. At present, original issues of Borderland Humanities are preserved in the Nankai University Library.

== See ==
Borderland Humanities Research Laboratory of Nankai University
