= Nankai =

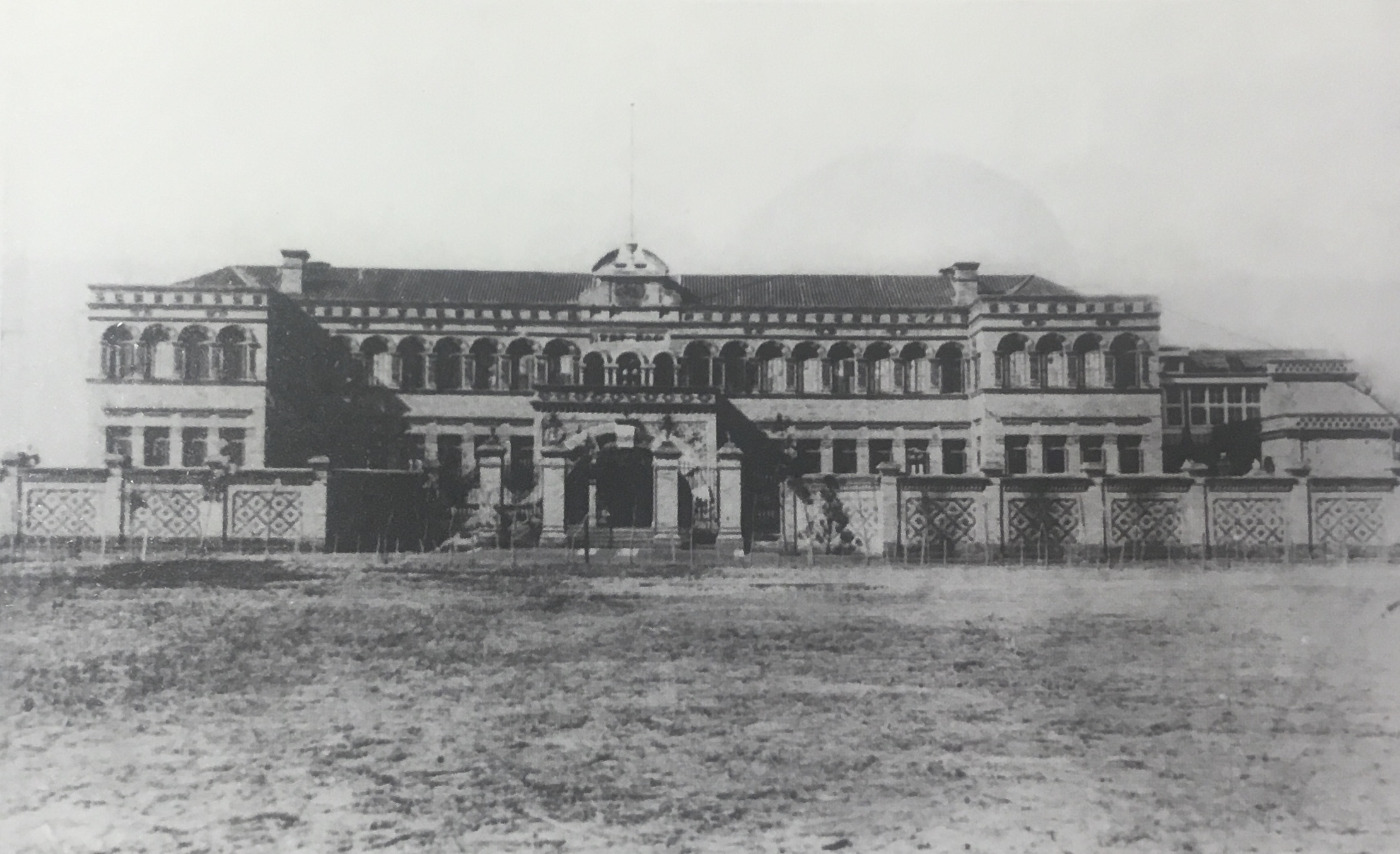
East building of Nankai High School, Tianjin in 1906

Nankai (南开) is a family of schools in China founded by Yan Xiu (严范孙) (1860–1920) and Zhang Boling (张伯苓) (1876–1951). The schools include:

- Nankai High School in Tianjin (天津南开中学) (1904).
- Nankai University in Tianjin (南开大学) (1919).
- The Nankai Women's High School (1923), Tianjin Second Nankai High School (天津第二南开中学) (present).
- The Nankai Elementary School in Tianjin (天津南开小学) (1928, ruined in WW2).
- Nanyu High School (1935), Chongqing Nankai Secondary School (重庆南开中学) (1936).
- Chongqing Nankai Elementary School (重庆南开小学) (1937).
- Shuguang Middle School in Zigong (自贡蜀光中学) (1937).
- Nankai University Affiliated High School (南开大学附中) (1954).

Nankai District (南开区, Nán-kāi Qū) in the city of Tianjin is named after Nankai schools. The flagship school, Nankai University, and the original Nankai High School are still located there.
