= Tianjin No. 1 High School =

State school in Tianjin, China

Coordinates: 39°06′48″N 117°11′18″E

Tianjin No.1 High School
- 天津市第一中学
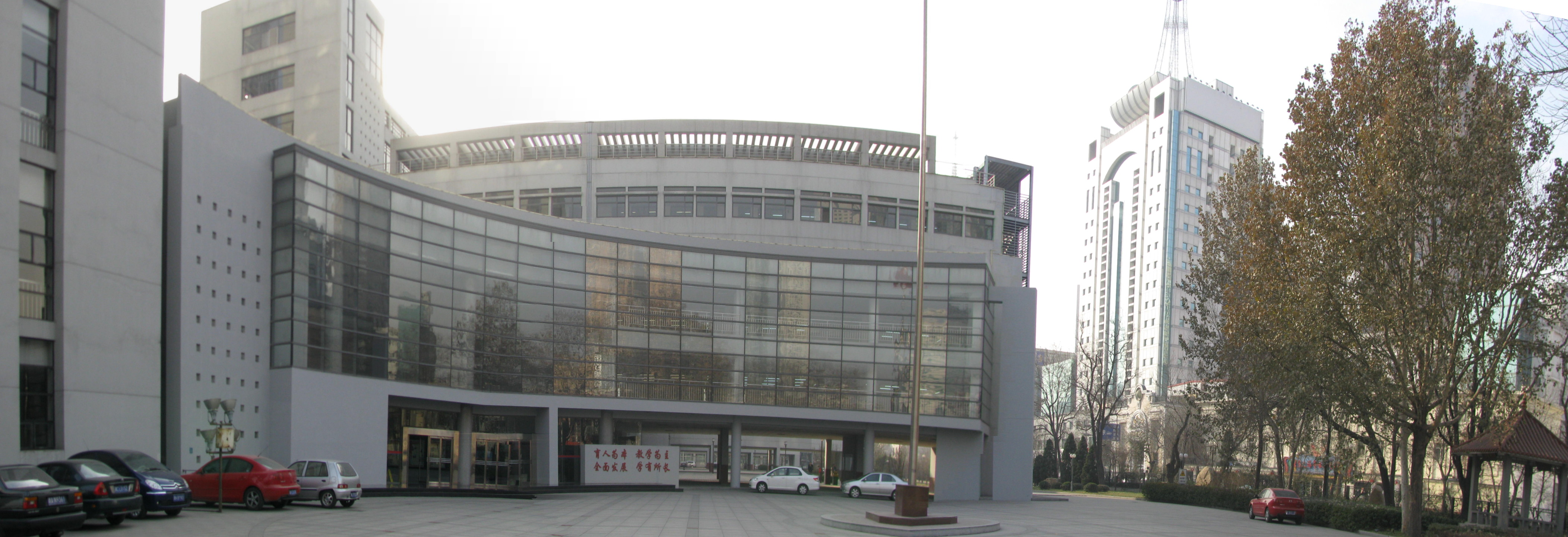
- No. 117 Xi'an Road, Heping, Tianjin

Information
- Type: State school
- Motto: "坚定正确的政治方向 艰苦奋斗的作风 自理自学的能力。" (Firmly adhere to the correct political direction, work hard, and have the ability to self-learn and self-educate.)
- Established: 1947
- Principal: Yang Jingwu
- Enrollment: About 3000 people
- Website: tjyz.tj.edu.cn/

Tianjin No. 1 High School is a key senior high school directly administered by the Tianjin Municipal Education Commission. It is located at No. 117 Xi’an Road, Heping, Tianjin.The school was originally established in 1947 as Tianjin Municipal High School. In January 1949, following its takeover, it was renamed Tianjin No. 1 High School. In 1978, it was designated as one of the first key high schools in Tianjin. In 2001, Tianjin Heping High School was fully merged into it. In 2003, a new teaching building of Tianjin No. 1 High School was completed and put into use. In March 2023, Tianjin No. 1 High School led the establishment of the Tianjin No. 1 High School Education Group.

== History of the school ==
In 1941, during the suspension of Huiwen Middle School and Xinxue Middle School, Tianjin Special Municipal No. 2 Middle School (renamed No. 1 Middle School after 1945) and Tianjin Special Municipal No. 3 Middle School were established on the former campuses of the two schools, respectively. In September 1947, following the reopening of Huiwen Middle School and Xinxue Middle School, No. 1 and No. 3 Middle Schools were merged and renamed Tianjin Municipal High School, with its campus located at the former British Barracks (Xi’an Road, District 10).

In January 1949, after the People’s Liberation Army handed control of Tianjin to the Tianjin Municipal People’s Government, the latter assumed control of Tianjin Municipal High School and renamed it Tianjin No. 1 High School.

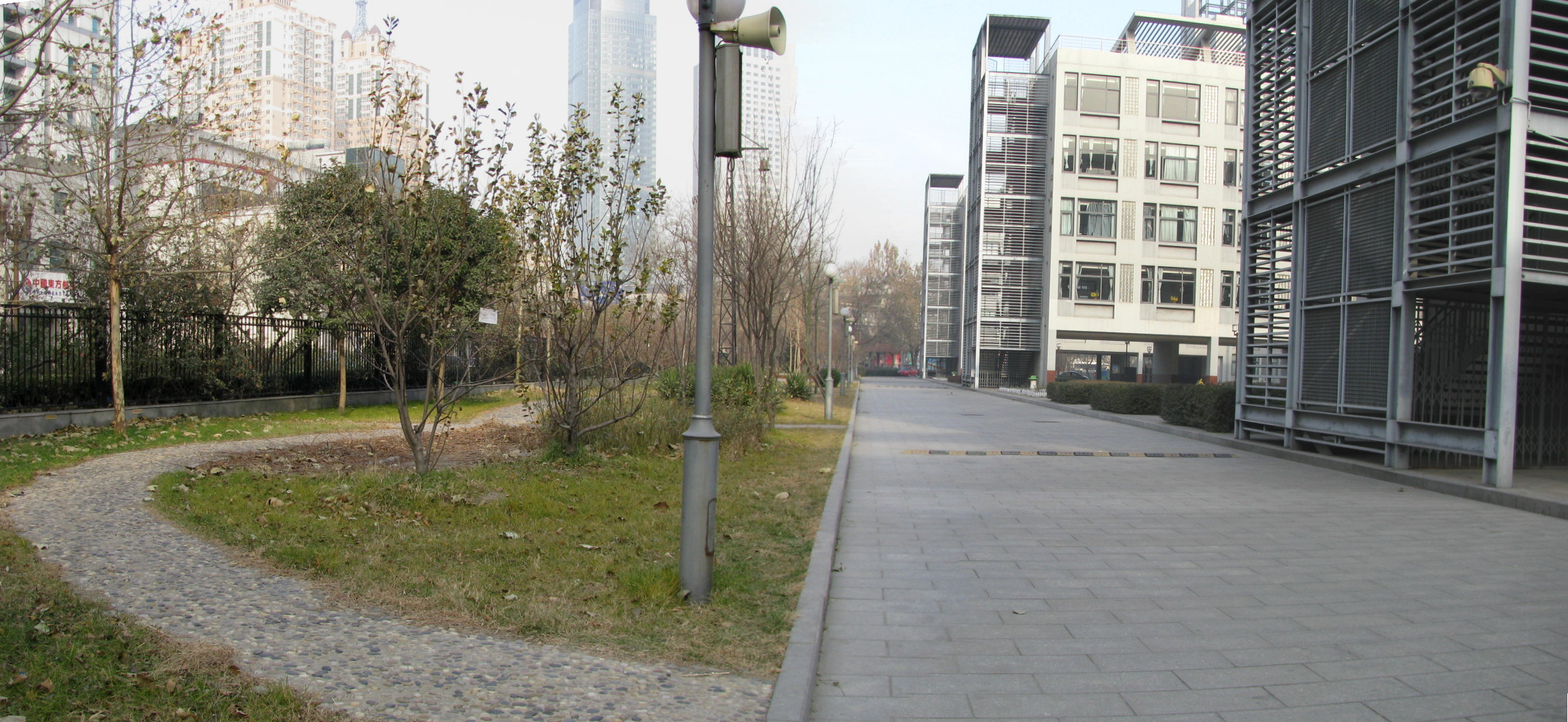
Tianjin No.1 Middle School Teaching Building

On August 23, 1952, the Tianjin Municipal People’s Government appointed Wei Li as vice principal of Tianjin No. 1 High School. In October of the same year, Huang Jing, then Mayor of Tianjin, signed the official appointment, promoting Wei Li to the position of principal.

In 1978, Tianjin No. 1 High School was designated as one of the first key high schools in Tianjin.In 1981, following a reassessment by the Tianjin Municipal Government, Yaohua High School and Tianjin No. 1 High School were confirmed as two key high schools directly administered by the municipal education authorities in Heping District.In February 2001, Tianjin Heping High School was fully merged into Tianjin No. 1 High School. In 2002, land formerly belonging to the Heping Pharmaceutical Factory was allocated to the school.

On July 28, 2002, Tianjin No. 1 High School relocated to the former campus of Heping High School. From October 20, due to the construction of new school buildings, teaching activities were temporarily conducted across multiple sites. Some grades attended classes at the Liuzhou Road campus and the Yifu Building, while others were accommodated at Tianjin Model Primary School. Laboratory classes and physical education were held at Tianjin High School’s facilities, and boarding students were temporarily housed in the dormitories of No. 2 Nankai High School. In August 2003, all teachers and students returned to the newly completed campus.

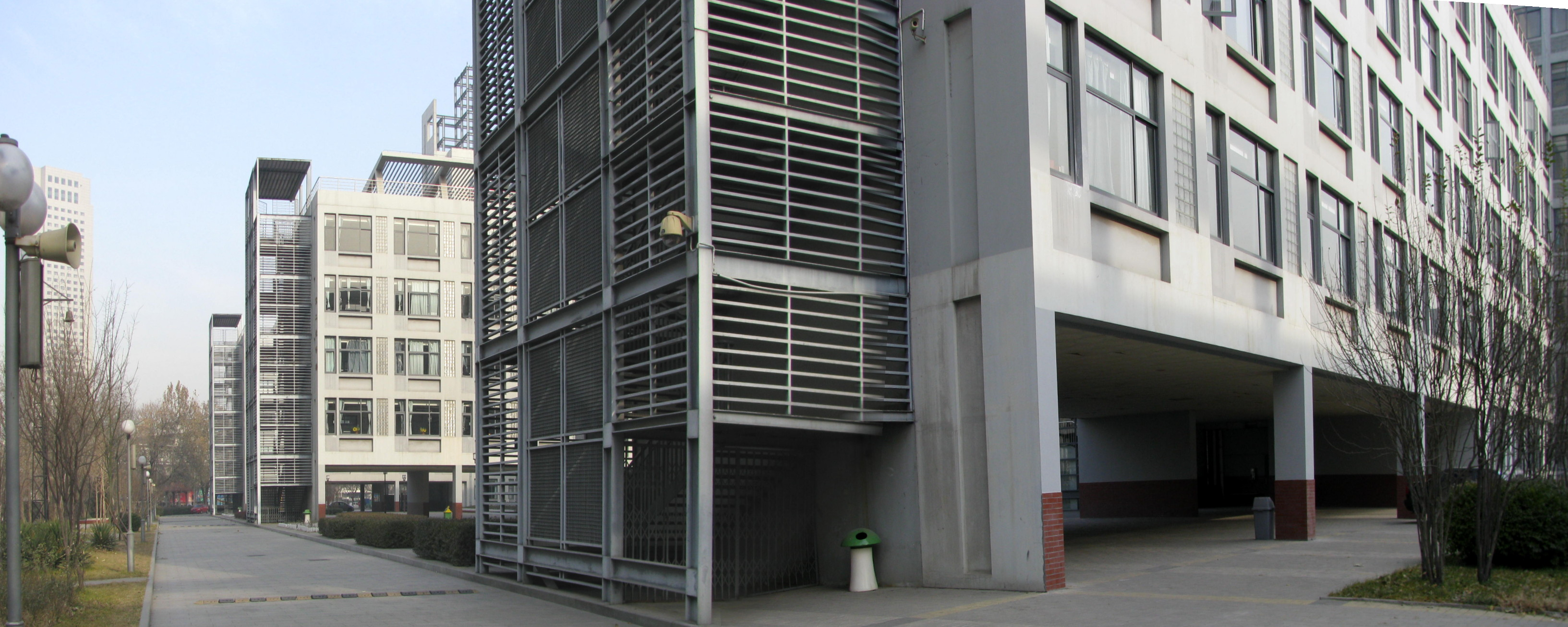
Tianjin No.1 Middle School

In January 2019, Tianjin No. 1 High School signed a partnership assistance agreement with Xiong'an County High School in Hebei Province, establishing the Tianjin No. 1 High School Xiong'an Campus.

In March 2023, Tianjin No. 1 High School, as the leading institution, established the Tianjin No. 1 High School Education Group. Its member schools include Tianjin Port Free Trade Zone Airport School, Tianjin No. 1 High School Binhai School, Tianjin No. 1 High School Xiong’an Campus, Tianjin No. 1 High School Hebei School, and Tianjin No. 1 High School Jinnan School.

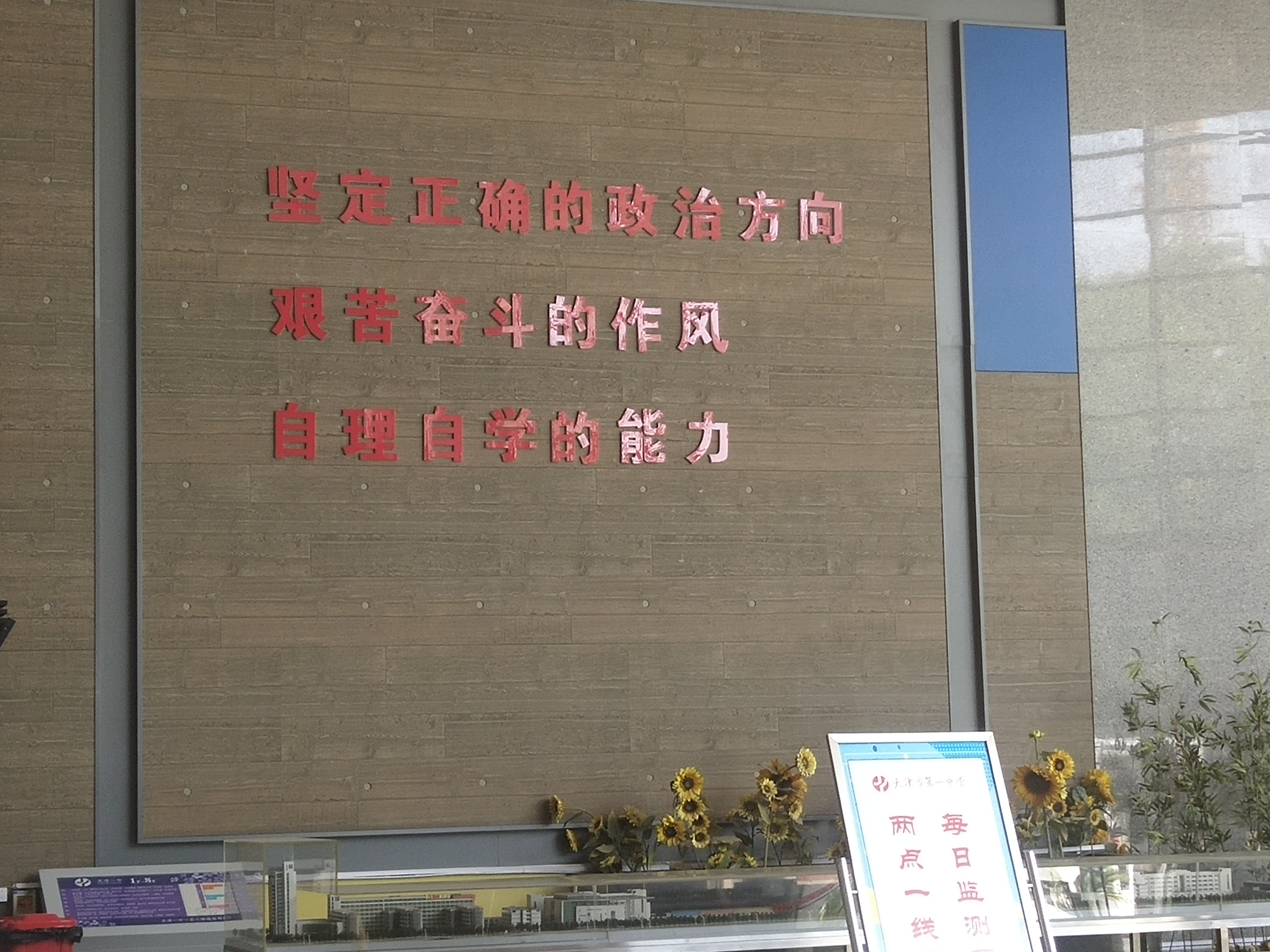
The school motto proposed by Wei Li, "Firmly adhere to the correct political direction, work hard, and have the ability to self-learn", is located in the hall of Building D of Tianjin No.1 Middle School.

== Notable alumni ==
- Luo Baoming — former Governor of Hainan Province and Communist Party Secretary of Hainan; on July 25, 2024, he surrendered himself to authorities on suspicion of serious disciplinary and legal violations.
- Tian Zengpei — Chairperson of the Committee of Foreign Affairs
- Gao Qiang — former Party Secretary and Executive Vice Minister of the Ministry of Health of the People’s Republic of China.
- Li Wenhua — ecologist; academician of the Academician of Chinese Academy of Engineering the International Eurasian Academy of Sciences.
- Xu Qifeng — academician of the Chinese Academy of Engineering.
- Guo Chunning — original designer of the emblem of the 2008 Summer Olympics.
- Li Guangxi — opera singer; National First-Class Actor.
- Chang Guitian — xiangsheng (crosstalk) performer.
