= Nankai University Affiliated High School =

High school in Tianjin, China

Coordinates: 39.1133°N 117.1541°E

Nankai University Affiliated High School, located on Santan Road in Nankai District, Tianjin, was established in 1960. Its predecessor was the Tianjin University Nankai University Affiliated High School. It used to be a school for the children of faculty and staff of Nankai University and Tianjin University. Currently, the junior high school department admits students from Nankai District, and the senior high school department admits students from across Tianjin. In 2007, Tianjin No. 43 Middle School merged into Nankai University Affiliated High School. The original site of Nankai University Affiliated High School within Nankai University was converted into the Nankai University Center for Combinatorial Mathematics.

Nankai University Affiliated High School and Tianjin Nankai High School, founded in 1904, are two independent schools with no affiliation to each other.
