= Feng Wenqian =

- 冯文潜
- Born: December 2, 1896; HebeiZhuozhou
- Died: April 30, 1963 (aged 66); Tianjin
- Other name: Liu Yi
- Citizenship: China
- Education: National Southwestern Associated University; Nankai University
- Alma mater: Tianjin Nankai High School; Grinnell College; University of Chicago; Humboldt University of Berlin
- Style: Philosophy
- Spouse: Huang Fuxian

Feng Wenqian (Chinese: 冯文潜; 1896–1963), courtesy name Liuyi (Chinese: 柳漪), was born in Hebei, Zhuozhou. He was a philosopher and educator in the People's Republic of China.

== Life ==
From 1912 to 1917, he studied at Tianjin Nankai High School and a university preparatory class in Tianjin. In 1917, he entered Grinnell College in the United States and graduated in 1920. From 1920 to 1922, he studied at the University of Chicago Research Institute. From 1922 to 1928, he studied philosophy and history at the Humboldt University of Berlin. After returning to China, he served as a lecturer and associate professor in the Department of Philosophy at Nanjing Central University, a professor of philosophy at Nankai University, a professor and acting director of the Department of Philosophy at Southwest Associated University in Kunming, a professor of philosophy and dean of the School of Literature, as well as the director of the Department of Philosophy and History at Nankai University, and the director of the Tianjin History Museum.
