= Tao Yunkui =

Chinese anthropologist

Tao Yunkui (1904–1944) was a Chinese anthropologist from Wujin, Jiangsu. Associated with the German school of anthropology, he served as the inaugural director of the Borderland Humanities Research Office at Nankai University and was the editor-in-chief of the journal Borderland Humanities

== Life ==
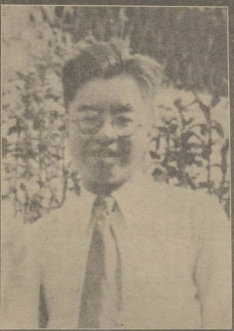
Tao Yunkui

In 1924, Tao was admitted to Nankai University. In 1927, he went to Germany, where he studied at the University of Berlin and the University of Hamburg, majoring in anthropology, genetics, and ethnology. After obtaining his doctoral degree, he returned to China. In 1934, he was appointed as an editor at the Institute of History and Philology of the Academia Sinica in Nanjing. During this period, he conducted long-term fieldwork among ethnic minority groups in Yunnan and advocated studying the various ethnic groups of Yunnan from a cultural-historical perspective.

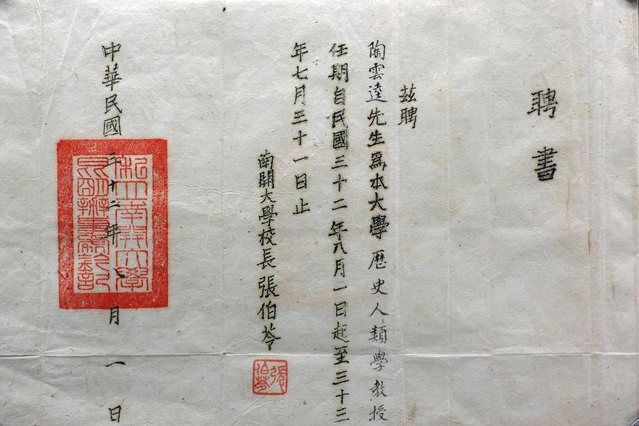
Invitation Letter from Zhang Boling, President of Nankai University, to Tao Yunkui

After the outbreak of the War of Resistance Against Japan, he served as Chair of the Department of Sociology at Yunnan University, as well as Professor of Historical Anthropology at the National Southwestern Associated University and Nankai University. He also concurrently served as Director of the Frontier Humanities Research Office at the Faculty of Arts, Nankai University, and Editor-in-Chief of the journal Frontier Humanities. In 1942, he contracted hemorrhagic fever and died in January 1944 at the Yunnan University Hospital.
