= Rui Yifu =

Rui Yifu (May 18, 1898- July 7, 1991), born in Liyang, Jiangsu, was an anthropologist of the Republic of China.

== Life ==
Rui Yifu studied in the Department of Foreign Languages at National Southeast University in his early years.He later went to the United States to study anthropology at the University of California, Berkeley, and Yale University.

From 1930 onward, he successively served as an assistant in the Ethnology Section of the Institute of Social Sciences, Academia Sinica; assistant, associate research fellow, editor, and research fellow in the Anthropology Section of the Institute of History and Philology, Academia Sinica. In 1944, under the framework of the National Southwestern Associated University, Nankai University intended to appoint Rui as head of its Frontier Humanities Research Office, but he did not assume the post due to illness. He also served as a professor in the Department of Frontier Administration at National Central University and as a legislator in the Legislative Yuan of the National Government. In 1949, he moved to Taiwan. In the spring of 1950, he concurrently served as a professor in the Department of History at National Taiwan University; in the same year, when the Department of Archaeology and Anthropology was established, he became a full-time professor and concurrently director of the Anthropology Division of Academia Sinica.He also concurrently served as a professor in the Department of Home Economics at National Taiwan Normal University and in the Department of History at Tamkang College of Arts and Sciences.

In 1964, he went to the United States to teach, serving successively as a visiting professor in the Department of Anthropology at the University of Washington in Seattle and at Indiana University. He returned to Taiwan in 1966 and continued to serve as professor and research director in the Department of Archaeology and Anthropology at National Taiwan University, while also teaching at the Graduate Institute of Ethnology and Overseas Chinese Studies at Chinese Culture University. He also served as a member of the Committee for the Design of the Recovery of the Mainland and the Committee for the Promotion of the Chinese Cultural Renaissance Movement. He was later elected an Academician of Academia Sinica. Rui Yifu conducted long-term research on ethnological theory and ethnic cultures, with notable contributions to the study of ancient Chinese kinship systems, the composition of the Chinese nation, and Miao culture.

On July 7, 1991, Rui Yifu died in Taipei.

== Work ==
- Chinese Ethnic Culture and Its Essays
- Report on the Investigation of Miao Ethnic Groups in Western Hunan (co authored)
- The Wedding and Funeral Customs of Ya Que Miao in Southern Sichuan
- Anthropological Dictionary (Editor in Chief)
- The Nine Clans System and Erya's Interpretation of Kinship
- Miao Man Atlas
