= Xing Gongwan =

Chinese linguist

- Born: 1914; Anqing, Anhui, Republic of China
- Died: 2004 (aged 89–90)

Academic background
- Education: Anhui University

Academic work
- Discipline: Linguistics
- Institutions: Nankai University

Xing Gongwan (1914–2004), originally named Xing Qinglan, was a Chinese linguist. He served as a professor at Nankai University and former head of its Department of Chinese Language and Literature, and was also a former Vice President of the Chinese Language Society.

== Life ==
Xing Qinglan was born in Anqing, Anhui, Republic of China. In 1933, he was admitted to the Department of Chinese Language and Literature at Anhui University. In 1937, he was accepted into the Linguistics Section of the Institute of History and Philology, Academia Sinica, but was unable to enroll due to the outbreak of the Second Sino-Japanese War. He formally enrolled in 1940, where he studied under Li Fanggui.

After graduation, he taught in the Department of Chinese at the National Southwestern Associated University and also studied under Luo Changpei. In 1946, he began teaching at Nankai University in Tianjin, and continued there after the founding of the People's Republic of China in 1949. From 1953 to 1956, he was assigned by the Chinese government to teach at the Moscow Institute of Oriental Studies and Moscow State University in the Soviet Union. After returning to China in 1956, he served as head of the Department of Chinese Language and Literature at Nankai University and director of the Research Office of Chinese and Tai–Kadai Languages.
