= Lei Haizong =

Chinese historian

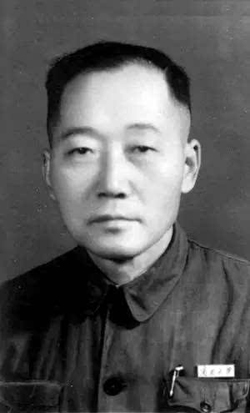
- Born: June 18, 1902; Hebei, Yongqing County
- Died: December 25, 1962 (aged 60); Tianjin
- Occupations: History, World History
- Political party: Kuomintang (1942-1949); Jiusan Society (1956-1962)
- Spouse: Zhang Jingfu (1930)
- Children: Lei Chongli

Lei Haizong (June 18, 1902 – December 25, 1962), originally named Lei Deyi, courtesy name Bolun, was a Chinese historian from Yongqing County, Hebei Province. He served as a professor at Nankai University and Tsinghua University.

Lei advocated an approach to historical studies that balanced textual criticism with comprehensive synthesis, and he was regarded as one of the representative figures of the "Zhan Guo Ce School" and the "Tsinghua School." He was also counted among the "Four Great Historians of Nankai," alongside Liang Qichao, Jiang Tingfu, and Zheng Tianting.

== Life ==
In 1902, Lei Haizong was born in Yongqing County, Hebei Province. His father, Lei Mingxia, was a pastor of the local Chung Hua Sheng Kung Hui. In 1910, he entered a church-run elementary school. In August 1917, he enrolled at Chongde Middle School in Beijing. In May 1919, he participated in the May Fourth Movement. In September, with church sponsorship, he transferred to the advanced division of Tsinghua School, entering directly into the second year. After graduating in June 1922, he passed a government-sponsored examination and, in September, entered the Department of History at the University of Chicago, majoring in history with a minor in philosophy. In September 1924, he began doctoral studies under the supervision of James Westfall Thompson. During this period, he associated with Liu Shaoyu, He Yunxuan, Wen Yichuan, and Zhang Jingyue, and took part in the Tsinghua Students Association in Chicago. He advocated democratic politics, opposed foreign intervention, and frequently wrote essays commenting on current affairs. In June 1927, he completed his dissertation The Political Thought of Anne Robert Jacques Turgot, successfully defended it, and obtained his Ph.D. degree.

In August, after returning to China, he was appointed associate professor in the Department of History at National Central University in Nanjing. In August 1929, he became department chair and also taught part-time at Ginling Women's College. In February 1931, he was appointed professor in the Department of History at Ginling Women's College, and in July, concurrently served as a researcher at its Institute of Chinese Culture. In August, he moved to National Wuhan University, where he served as professor in both the Department of History and the Department of Philosophy and Education.

In July 1932, he resigned from Wuhan University, and in September, he joined Tsinghua University, working alongside Jiang Tingfu. In August 1937, after the outbreak of the War of Resistance Against Japan, he left his wife and children to move south with the university to Changsha. In November, Changsha Temporary University opened, with the College of Liberal Arts located at Nanyue Bible College; Lei succeeded Liu Chong as chair of the Department of History and Sociology. In December, after the fall of Nanjing, the university decided to relocate to Kunming. Lei first returned to Changsha with the College of Liberal Arts, and later, together with Jin Yuelin, Ye Gongchao, and Wu Youxun, went to Guangzhou and Hong Kong to procure educational supplies. In May, he became professor in the Department of History at the National Southwestern Associated University and concurrently chair of the Department of History and Geography in the Teachers College. In the same year, together with Lin Tongji, he participated in editing Today's Review under Qian Duansheng, and alternated with Chen Hsueh-ping as editor-in-chief of Contemporary Review. In April 1940, he co-founded the semi-monthly Warring States Strategies in Kunming with Lin Tongji and Chen Quan（Professor at Nanjing University）. In August, he became chair of the Department of History at the Associated University. In spring 1942, he lectured at Yunnan University at the invitation of Lin Tongji. In December, he joined the Kuomintang through the introduction of Yao Congwu and Wang Xinzhong. In February 1943, he served as acting dean of the College of Liberal Arts. He declined an invitation from the Rockefeller Foundation to visit the United States, choosing instead to remain in China to support the war effort, training service corps members and translators. In February 1946, he signed the "Anti-Soviet Declaration" and participated in the "Anti-Soviet Demonstration" in Chongqing. In March, when Chiang Kai-shek visited Kunming and met the Kuomintang branch at the Associated University, Lei frankly pointed out the severity of inflation and suggested increasing student stipends. In July, after the death of Wen Yiduo, Lei served on the funeral committee. As Tsinghua resumed operations and moved north, Lei first went to Chongqing, then to Nanjing, Shanghai, and Tianjin. In August, Tsinghua reopened in Beiping, where he became chair of the Department of History. In spring 1947, he contributed to Independent Review, edited by Hu Shi. In January 1948, at the request of Wu Zhureng, head of the Kuomintang Beiping branch, he founded Weekly Review, which ceased publication in November. In December, he declined Chen Hsueh-ping's invitation and chose to remain in Beiping. In September 1949, he resigned as chair of the Department of History.

In spring 1950, he studied Marxism and participated in land reform movements in the suburbs of Beijing. In March, he became a subject of political control. In March 1951, he went to Northwest China to observe land reform; in April, after returning to Beijing, he was released from control and wrote a series of articles criticizing the church. In March 1952, he conducted ideological self-examination. In September, following the 1952 reorganization of higher education in China, Tsinghua's Department of History was abolished, and he, together with Zheng Tianting from Peking University, was reassigned to the Department of History at Nankai University, where they established teaching and research sections for ancient Chinese history and world history, respectively. In 1953, he became a member of the editorial board of History Teaching. In 1956, he joined the China Democratic League (Jiusan Society). In April 1957, he attended forums on the "Hundred Flowers Campaign" organized by the People's Daily and the Tianjin Municipal Committee, arguing that the development of social sciences had stagnated and required new materials and interpretations. In July, he was labeled a "Rightist" at the Tianjin Anti-Rightist Campaign and was dismissed from his post. Suffering from chronic kidney disease, he developed hematuria during this period. In March 1958, the Party Committee of Nankai University decided to remove him from all positions. At the end of 1961, he was politically rehabilitated.

In March 1962, despite his illness, he returned to teaching. On December 16, he suffered a relapse and was hospitalized. On December 25, he died at Tianjin General Hospital of uremia and heart failure.

== Thought ==
Lei Haizong is best known for his research on "Chinese soldiery." Rather than focusing on military institutions, he analyzed the spirit of soldiers, examining their composition, discipline, ethos, and psychology. He pointed out that the composition of ancient Chinese armies evolved from aristocrats and commoners to include the poor, vagrants, prisoners, and even foreign groups, ultimately leading to a situation in which soldiers and bandits became indistinguishable and mutual hostility arose between the military and civilians. He argued that a "culture without soldiers" left society unable to cope with wartime crises, stating that "the problem of the Han dynasty is a permanent problem of China; the issue of soldiery after the Eastern Han was never resolved," which he saw as a major cause of China's prolonged weakness. However, Zhang Qiyun rebutted this view by emphasizing the long-term norms of conscription and military institutions over two millennia, while Liang Shuming believed that Lei's cultural critique insightfully identified core issues.

He criticized philological scholarship that focused solely on textual criticism, arguing that understanding history is not merely about knowing facts, but about grasping the spirit of an age. Without an understanding of thought, knowledge, and belief, there can be no true understanding of history.

Taking the future of the nation as his fundamental concern, Lei approached history from the perspective of world civilization. Influenced by Spengler’s morphology of cultures, he sought to connect China with global historical patterns, breaking away from both traditional historiographical imagination and Western-centric narratives. This also reflected his strong concern for politics. His role in founding Warring States Strategies further demonstrated his active engagement with real-world affairs. He proposed a "historical cyclical theory," invoking the idea of a "repetition of the Warring States period" to call for national development and progress. This ideal continued in his founding of Weekly Review, where he advocated freedom and individuality, a constitutional framework, appropriate market intervention, and gradual reform.

During the Anti-Rightist Campaign, most criticisms of Lei Haizong stemmed from his speeches at symposiums. Critics argued that by emphasizing the "history of the development of productive tools," he negated class struggle and socialism, denied the role of slavery in the five-stage theory of socio-economic development, and his past anti-communist and anti-Soviet positions were also brought up against him.

== Work ==
- 1940, "Chinese Culture and Chinese Soldiers," Commercial Press
- 1946, co authored by Lin Tongji, "History of Cultural Forms", Dadong Book Company
- 2001, Outline of Western Cultural History, Shanghai Ancient Books Publishing House
- 2012, Outline of National History, Wuhan Publishing House
