= Tianjin Nankai High School =

Public school in Tianjin, China

- 天津南开中学
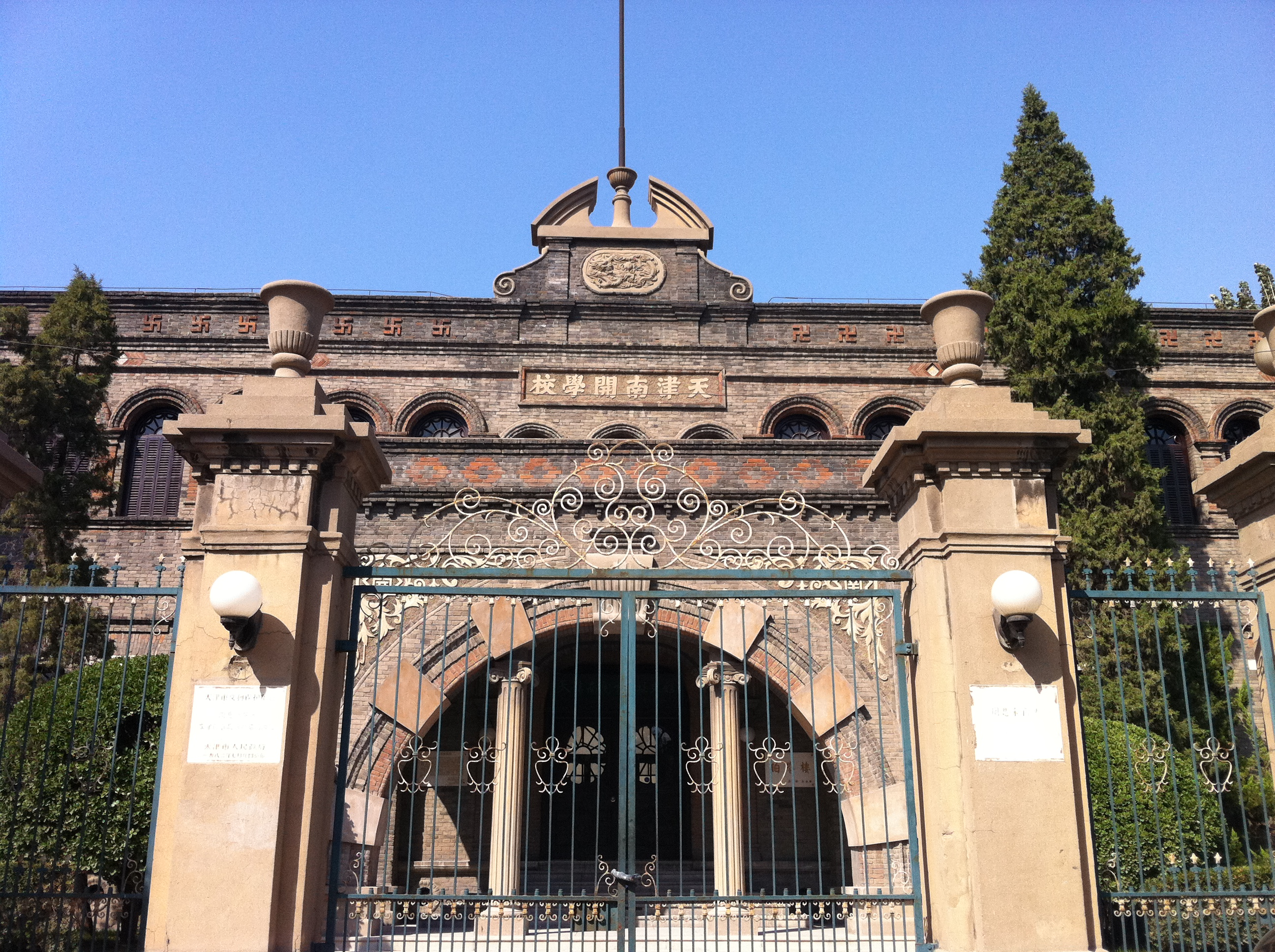
- Bo Ling House

Location
- Nankai District; Tianjin; China
- Coordinates: 39°07′50″N 117°09′53″E

Information
- Type: Public
- Motto: 允公允能，日新月异
- Established: 1904
- Website: Nankai High School

Tianjin Nankai High School
- Simplified Chinese: 天津南开中学
- Traditional Chinese: 天津南開中學
Transcriptions
Standard Mandarin
- Hanyu Pinyin: Tiānjīn Nánkāi Zhōngxúe
- Wade–Giles: T'ien1-chin1 Nan2-k'ai1 Chung1-hsüeh2

Tianjin Nankai High School (Chinese: 天津南开中学) is a college-preparatory high school in Tianjin, China. This is the original Nankai High School, and it is often referred to as Nankai High School in Tianjin to differentiate it from Chongqing Nankai Middle School, its sister school in Chongqing. Nankai was one of the first modern secondary schools in China and boasts several of the important figures of modern Chinese history as its alumni. The main campus is located at 22 Nankai 4th Rd in Nankai District. The other two campuses are in Sino-Singapore Tianjin Eco-City and Haihe Jiaoyu Yuanqu, Tianjin.

== History ==
Nankai High School was founded in 1904 by Yan Xiu (also known as Yan Fansun). Nankai was originally a private school, featuring a western-style college-preparatory curricula instead of a traditional Confucian curriculum. It was the first school in the Nankai Family of Schools. This system would later be expanded to include Nankai University in 1919. Nankai University would become one of China's most prestigious universities.

=== Establishment ===
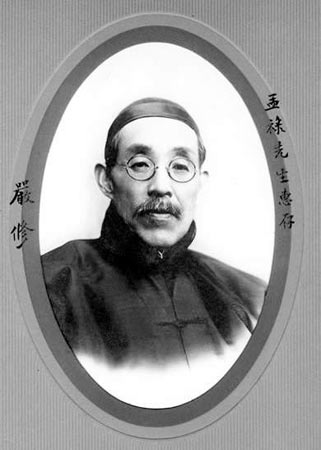
Nankai's founder, Yan Xiu

Before his work at Nankai, Yan Xiu was an intellectual with a strong understanding of traditional Chinese culture who had held positions at the prestigious Hanlin Academy earlier in his career, and in both China's provincial and central governments. The difficulties that confronted China in the late nineteenth century led Yan to become interested in Western and Japanese models of education, to which he attributed the contemporary strength of the West and Japan. Yan's experiences working within the Chinese bureaucracy led him to believe that only the most progressive reforms could save China from further decline.

Yan Xiu belonged to a group of reform-minded intellectuals who, in 1905, presented a memorial that suggested abolishing the traditional examination system, focused on knowledge of the Confucian classics, to a system of education focused on practical knowledge. Yan's memorial was well received by the Qing government, which was by then interested in reform as a way to preventing the dynasty from destruction. After he had received a mandate for reform, Yan took part in a large-scale educational reform aimed at modernizing the educational institutions throughout China. After the Qing dynasty was abolished in the 1911 Xinhai Revolution, Yan was offered several high-level government positions, but refused them all in preference to devoting his time and energy to the establishment of Nankai.

After 1911 Yan Xiu appointed Zhang Boling as Nankai's principal. Zhang had been a well-known advocate for reform and moral renewal during the Qing. By the time of his appointment, Zhang had already gained a reputation as a progressive modernist, advocating the inclusion of Western sciences and physical exercise into the Chinese curriculum. After his appointment as Nankai's principle, Zhang gained a reputation for pioneering educational methods that would be widely emulated throughout China within his lifetime.

=== During the Second Sino-Japanese War ===
By 1936, war between China and Japan seemed inevitable. The city of Tianjin was located near the Japanese puppet state of Manchukuo and was vulnerable to a Japanese attack in the event of war. In anticipation of this war, the administration of the Nankai Schools established another high school in Chongqing, far to the southwest in the interior of China. This school would become known as Nankai High School in Chongqing.

When the Second Sino-Japanese War began in September 1937, all the faculty and students at Nankai High School were evacuated to the sister school in Chongqing, where the school would remain for the duration of the war. Nankai University and other Chinese universities were also evacuated to the cities of Changsha and (later) Kunming. After the war ended in 1945, Nankai High School was relocated back to its original campus in Tianjin. However, the Nankai High School in Chongqing remained in operation and still exists to this day.

== Education ==
=== After 1911 ===
After his appointment as principle, Zhang Boling implemented a synthesis of Japanese and American methods that were grounded in traditional Chinese concepts of self-cultivation. Zhang devised Nankai's curriculum in the attempt to produce students who could overcome the five illnesses that Zhang believed afflicted China in his time: ignorance; weakness; poverty; disunity; and selfishness. Zhang believed that only an education that combined physical education, group activities, scientific education, and moral cultivation could produce leaders who would later contribute to rebuilding China. Zhang created a school motto composed of the characters gong (public spirit) and neng (ability), expressing his hope that his students would develop into leaders with a spirit of integrity, dedication, and civic responsibility who would also have the practical abilities necessary to confront China's difficulties.

Nankai was a boarding school with strict schedules, discipline, and moral codes, and promoted a strict daily schedule of student activities, similar to contemporary British schools. Zhang placed great importance on physical activity, and worked hard to break down traditional Chinese attitudes of contempt for physical exercise and manual labour. Zhang considered himself as both a teacher and a role model to his students, attempting to personally instruct them in basic principles of hygiene, eating with students, and participating in their exercises. Zhang's close association with his students was unusual in China (and elsewhere), but contributed to the admiration that most of his students reportedly felt for him throughout their lives.

=== Today ===
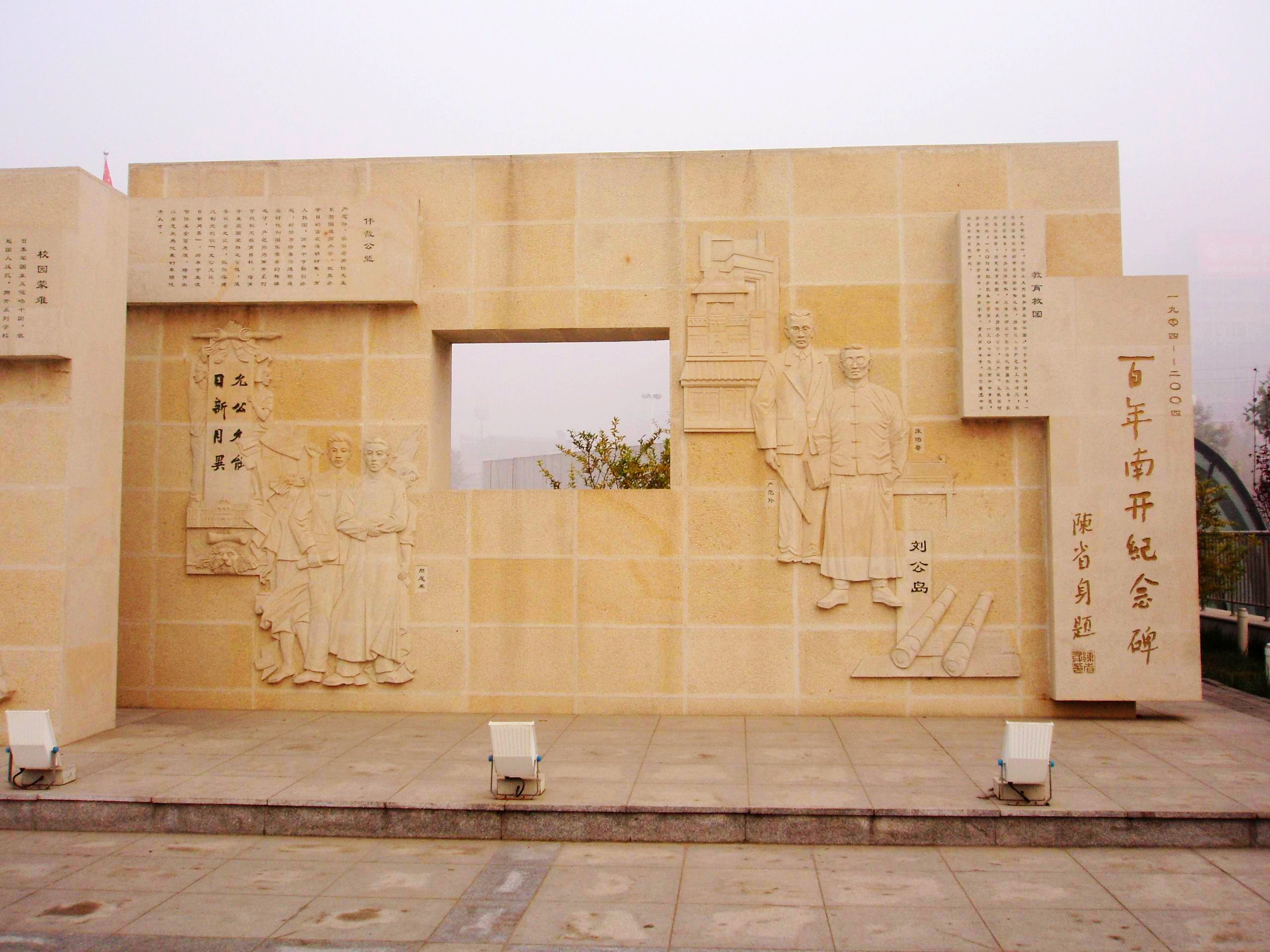
Centennial monument

Today, Nankai High School is a public school best known for its success in preparing students for the National College Entrance Examination 高考 (Gāokǎo). The graduates of the school are typically admitted to the best universities in China and around the world. Its college-preparatory curricula covers a wide range of subjects in the humanities, sciences, and social sciences. The school also encourages its students to take part in various academic extracurricular activities, including the International Science Olympiad. Between 1998 and 2005, four Nankai students became IPhO gold medal winners. Nankai students also received gold medals in IMO, IChO, IBO, and IOI.

Admission to Nankai High School is usually selective and is based on an applicant's primary school grades and performance on an entrance exam. In 2005, 4,000 students were admitted to Nankai. The school is supported by 300 faculty and staff. The current school principal is Ma Yuemei.

In the early 2000s the school established a twinning relationship with a school in the United Kingdom, Manningtree High School. Following the establishment of this relationship, students from both schools visited each other in a series of exchange visits. The most recent visit was in 2008, where Nankai hosted Manningtree during the Beijing Olympics.

== Notable alumni ==
=== Zhou Enlai ===
The most famous graduate of Nankai High School was Zhou Enlai, the first Premier of the People's Republic of China. Zhou's skill in literature and composition won him several awards and scholarships, and caught the attention of Nankai's founder, Yan Xiu. Yan once proposed that Zhou marry his daughter, but Zhou declined. Zhou later explained (to a classmate, Zhang Honghao) that his decision not to marry Yan's daughter was due to fears that Zhou could not financially support a family, and that Yan, as his father-in-law, would dominate Zhou's future.

Zhou's accomplishments and personal qualities led him to be selected as the speaker at his graduating class, in June 1917. Zhou's experience at Nankai has been cited as a foundation of Zhou's emotional resilience and intellectual growth. Zhang's teachings of gong and neng had been so deeply ingrained in Zhou that he left the school with a great desire to pursue public service, and to acquire the skills necessary to do so. Zhou's participation in debates and stage performances at Nankai contributed to the eloquence and persuasiveness that Zhou would later display throughout his political career.

=== Others ===
Several other national leaders were also graduates from the school, including another Chinese Premier, Wen Jiabao, several university presidents, and more than sixty academicians. Since established in 2001, seven recipients of the annual Top National Scientist Awards were Nankai High School graduates, including Liu Dongsheng (2003), Ye Duzheng (2005), Wu Liangyong (2011) and Zhang Cunhao (2013). Famous Nankai alumni include:

- Zhou Enlai (b. 1898), Chinese Premier (1949–1976)
- Wen Jiabao (b. 1942), Chinese Premier (2003-2013)
- Wu Dayou, President of Academia Sinica (1983–1994)
- Qian Siliang, President of Academia Sinica (1960–1983)
- Zhou Guangzhao, President of Chinese Academy of Sciences (1987–1997)
- Zhu Guangya, first President of Chinese Academy of Engineering (1994–1998)
- Zou Jiahua (b. 1926), Chinese Vice-Premier (1991–1998)
- Mei Yiqi, first President of Tsinghua University (1931–1948 and 1955–1962)
- Chang Li-sheng, Vice Premier of the Republic of China (1950–1954)
- Mao Yushi, economist
- Cao Yu, dramatist
- Jiao Juyin, director
- Zhou Zhongzheng, painter
- Wu Yuzhang, painter
- Zhou Ruchang, writer
- Mu Dan, poet

In addition to its alumni, several famous writers were once members of the faculty at Nankai High School, including:

- Lao She, playwright
- He Qifang

== See also ==
- Chongqing Nankai High School
- Education in the People's Republic of China
