= Yan Xiu =

- 嚴修
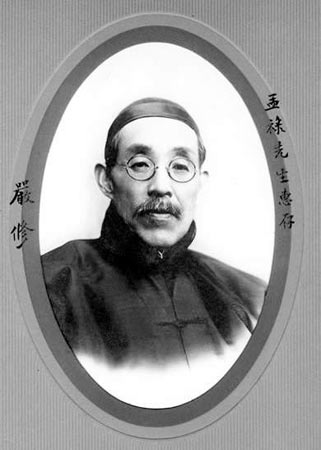
- Born: April 12, 1860; Tianjin, Qing Dynasty
- Died: March 15, 1929 (aged 68); Tianjin, Republic of China
- Occupation: Educator
- Known for: Founder of Nankai University

Yan Xiu
- Traditional Chinese: 嚴修
- Simplified Chinese: 严修
Transcriptions
Standard Mandarin
- Hanyu Pinyin: Yán Xiū
- Wade–Giles: Yen Hsiu

Yan Xiu (Chinese: 嚴修; Wade–Giles: Yen Hsiu; 12 April 1860 – 15 March 1929), also known as Yan Fansun, was a Chinese educator who, with Zhang Boling, founded Nankai University and the Nankai system of schools.

== Early life ==
Yan Xiu was born on 12 April 1860 into a salt merchant family in Tianjin during the Qing Dynasty.

== Early career ==
Despite belonging to a merchant family, he also belonged to the ranks of scholar-gentry. He was a controversial figure whose reformist ideas made him an outcast of Beijing politics and earned him criticism from fellow scholar-officials. As the educational commissioner of Guizhou, he proposed an essay-based special examination (jingji teke) as an alternative to the Chinese imperial examinations. Following the failure of his proposal and the Hundred Days' Reform, he was rejected from the scholarly circles by anti-reform court officials of the Qing government.

== Career in Tianjin ==
He returned to Tianjin in 1898 to work for the Yan household's salt trade monopoly of the Sanhe district. The wealth from the salt trade allowed Yan Xiu to continue his life as an educator, establishing a household school. He hired Zhang Boling to oversee the school's organization and curriculum. Zhang Boling was trained in Western knowledge, graduating in 1894 from the Beiyang Naval Academy in Tianjin, organized by Li Hongzhang.

Despite the events of the Boxer Rebellion, a violent uprising against foreign influence in China, Yan Xiu retained his reformist aspirations for Chinese education and later traveled to Japan in August–November 1902 to observe its education system. The Yan household school eventually merged with that of another merchant family, which later led to the formation of Nankai Primary School and Nankai Middle School in 1904 and eventually Nankai University in 1919.

In 1905, Yan established the Zhili Education Official Gazette, which was the earliest education official gazette in China.

== Death ==
Yan Xiu died on 15 March 1929 in Tianjin.

== Gallery ==
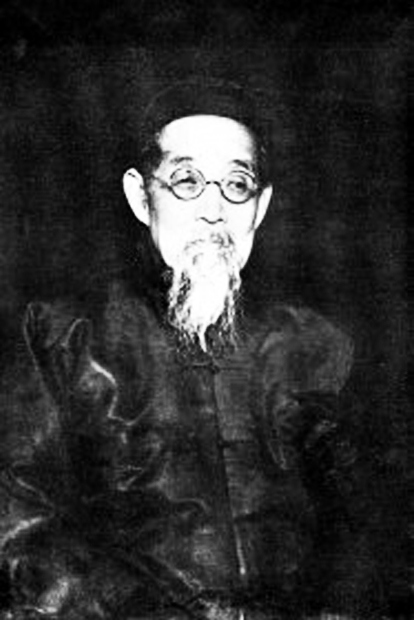

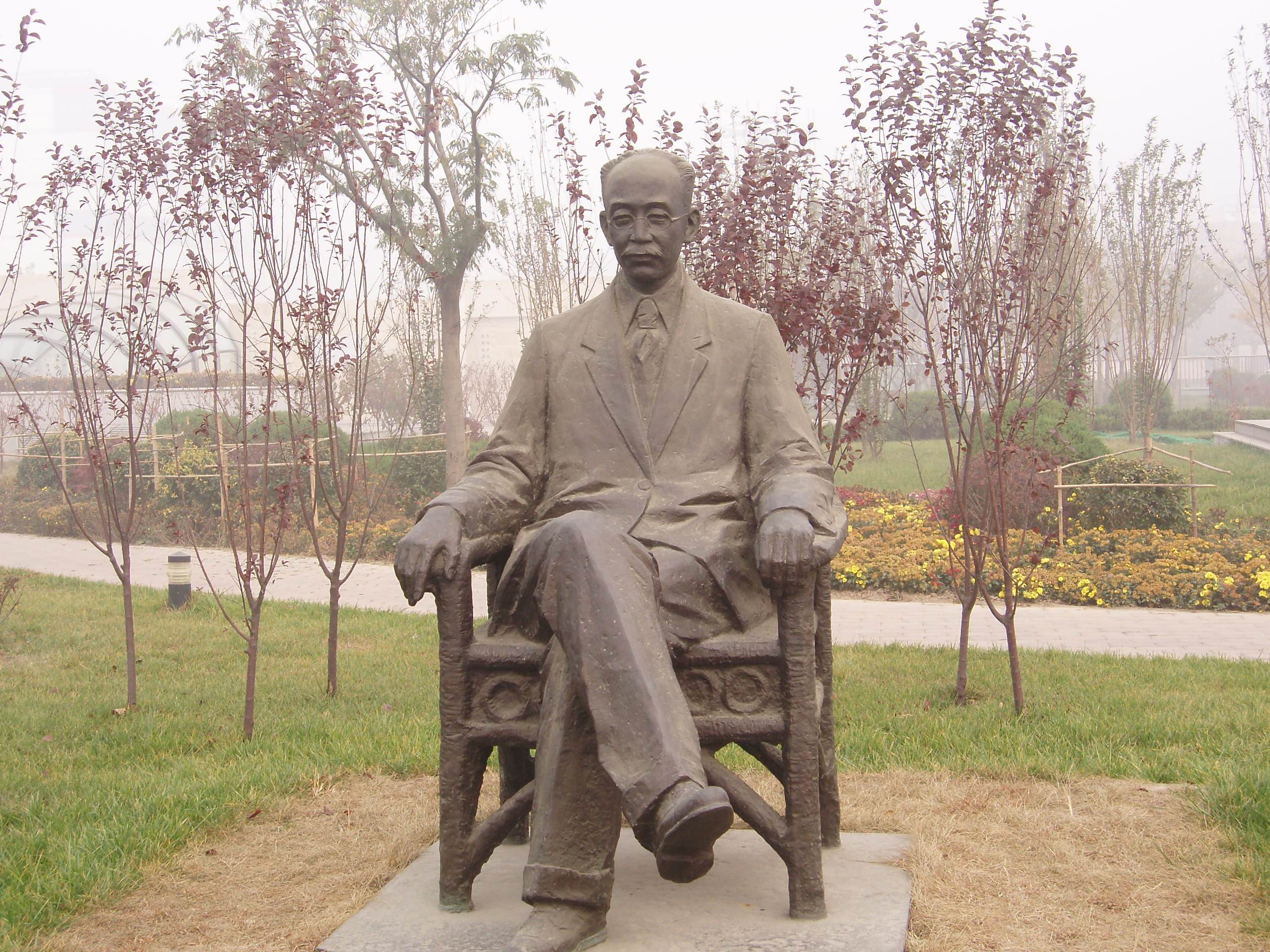
Statue of Yan Xiu in Nan Kai school in Tianjin, China
