= Nankai University Museum =

Museum in Tianjin, China

The Nankai University Museum is located on the Balitai Campus of Nankai University at 94 Weijin Road, Nankai , Tianjin, China. Established in May 2014, it originated from the cultural relics exhibition room of the museology program in the university’s Department of History. The museum holds a collection of more than 1,0000 cultural artifacts. Plans have been announced to relocate the museum to the university’s Jinnan Campus in the Tianjin Haihe Education Park.
