= 1952 Tianjin Higher Education Department Adjustment =

In 1952, Tianjin's higher education institutions underwent a departmental adjustment under the unified deployment of the Central People's Government of the People's Republic of 1952 reorganization of higher education in China. Tianjin's higher education institutions underwent division and reorganization, forming the basic layout of today.

== Specific adjustment measures ==
At the end of 1949, the Education Department of Nankai University was merged into Beijing Normal University. In 1952, the School of Engineering at Nankai University and Jinggu University, the Department of Chemical Engineering at Tsinghua University, Peking University, Yanjing University, Southwest Jiaotong University, and the Department of Architectural Engineering at Beijing Jiaotong University were merged into Tianjin University; The Mathematics and Physics Departments of Tianjin University have been merged into Nankai University. Afterwards, the departments transferred from Tianjin University include:

- The geological team was selected to participate in the establishment of Beijing Institute of Geology, which is now China University of Geosciences.
- Beijing Iron and Steel Institute, now known as University of Science and Technology Beijing, was established by drawing on the metal ore groups from the departments of metallurgy and mining.
- The petroleum extraction group of the mining department was transferred to the Department of Petroleum Engineering at Tsinghua University, now known as China University of Petroleum.
- The Department of Aeronautics was transferred and merged into the School of Aeronautics at Tsinghua University, now known as Beihang University.
- Transfer the coal mining group from the Mining Department to China University of Mining and Technology, now known as China University of Mining and Technology.
- Transfer the major of agricultural water conservancy and soil improvement from the Department of Water Resources to Wuhan University of Water Resources (now the School of Water Resources and Hydropower at Wuhan University).
- Transfer the surveying major from the Department of Civil Engineering to Wuhan Surveying and Mapping Institute (now School of Geodesy and Geomatics, Wuhan University).
- The Department of Mining and Metallurgy Engineering was transferred to Tangshan to establish Hebei University of Mining and Metallurgy, now known as North China University of Science and Technology.
- The Department of Textile Engineering was transferred to establish Hebei Textile Institute, now known as Tianjin University of Technology.
- The paper-making major in the Department of Chemical Engineering has been transferred to Tianjin University of Light Industry, now known as Tiangong University.
- The Telecommunications Department was selected as the main body to establish Beijing University of Posts and Telecommunications, now known as Beijing University of Posts and Telecommunications.
