= Li Wenhua (ecologist) =

Chinese ecologist (1932–2022)

- 李文华
- Born: 15 January 1932; Guangrao County, Shandong, China
- Died: 23 December 2022 (aged 90); Beijing, China
- Education: Beijing Forestry University
- Scientific career
- Fields: Ecology; Forestry
- Workplaces: Institute of Geographic Sciences and Resources, Chinese Academy of Sciences

Chinese name
- Simplified Chinese: 李文华
- Traditional Chinese: 李文華
Transcriptions
Standard Mandarin
- Hanyu Pinyin: Lǐ Wénhuá

Li Wenhua (Chinese: 李文华; 15 January 1932 – 23 December 2022) was a Chinese ecologist, and an academician of the Chinese Academy of Engineering.

== Biography ==
Li was born in Guangrao County, Shandong, on 15 January 1932. After high school in 1949, he studied, then taught, at what is now Beijing Forestry University. In September 1957, he pursued advanced studies in the Soviet Union, studying botany under biologist Sukachev.

Li returned to China in 1961 and continued to teach at Beijing Forestry University. In 1973, he became a member of the Qinghai Tibet Plateau Scientific Research Team of the Chinese Academy of Sciences, and in 1992 attained his role as a researcher at the Institute of Geographic Sciences and Resources. In 2002, he was recruited as dean of the School of Environment, Renmin University of China, and served until 2006.

On 23 December 2022, Li died in Beijing, at the age of 90.

== Honours and awards ==
- 1987 State Natural Science Award (First Class)
- 1991 State Science and Technology Progress Award (Third Class)
- 1997 Member of the Chinese Academy of Engineering
- 2018 Fellow of The World Academy of Sciences
