= Chang Po-ling =

Chinese educator

- 張伯苓
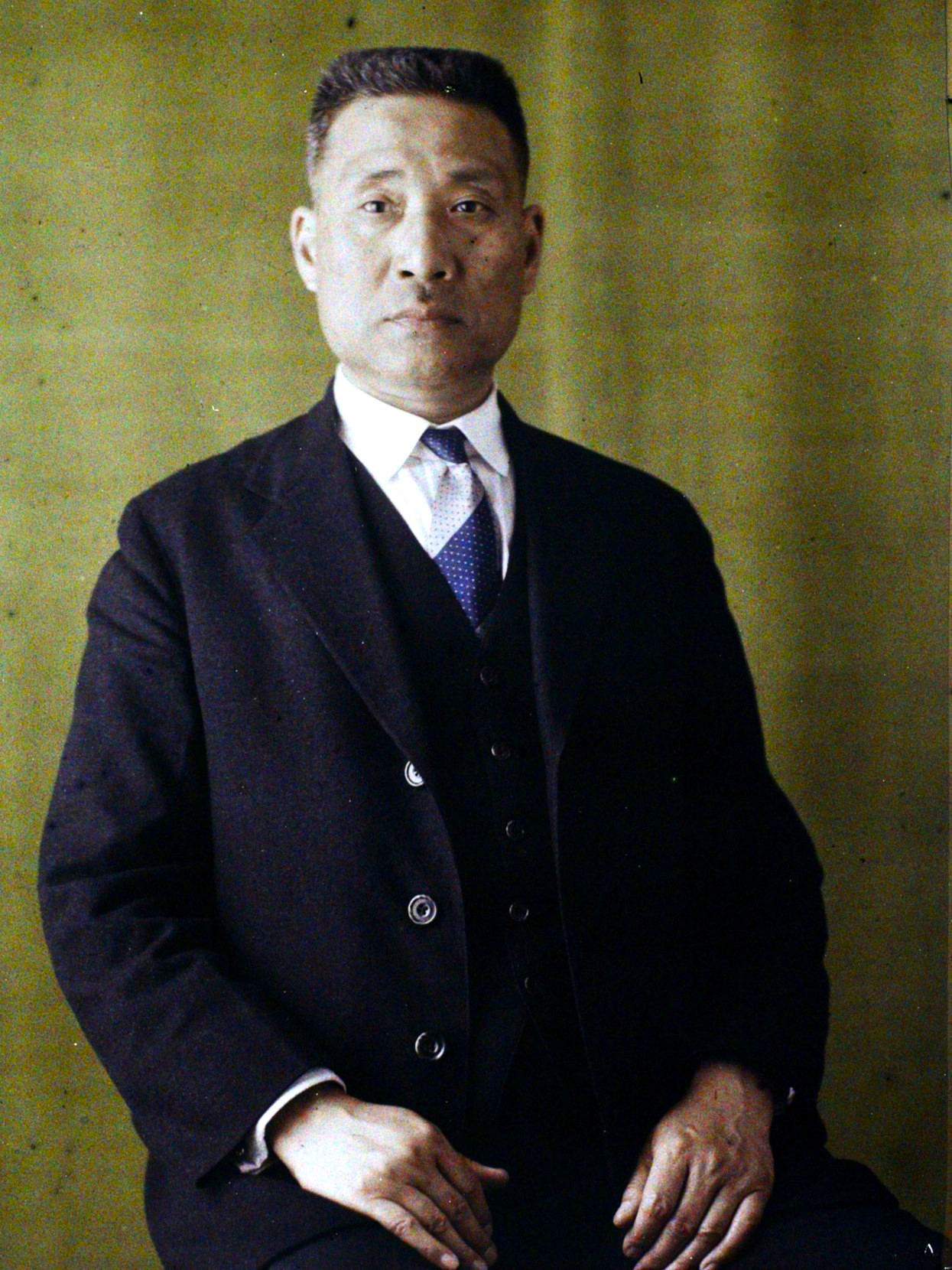
- Autochrome portrait by Georges Chevalier, 1929

President of the Examination Yuan
- In office July 10, 1948 – November 25, 1949
- Preceded by: Tai Chi-t'ao
- Succeeded by: Niou Yung-chien (acting)

President of Nankai University
- In office 1919–1948
- Preceded by: position created
- Succeeded by: Franklin Ho

Personal details
- Born: April 5, 1876 Tianjin, Qing Dynasty
- Died: February 23, 1951 (aged 74) Tianjin, People's Republic of China
- Party: Kuomintang (1941–1949)
- Education: Beiyang Naval College; Saint John's University, Shanghai

Chang Po-ling
- Traditional Chinese: 張伯苓
- Simplified Chinese: 张伯苓
Transcriptions
Standard Mandarin
- Hanyu Pinyin: Zhāng Bólíng
- Wade–Giles: Chang Po-ling

Chang Po-ling (Chinese: 張伯苓; pinyin: Zhang Boling; April 5, 1876 – February 23, 1951) was a Chinese educator who, alongside Yan Xiu, founded Nankai University and the Nankai system of schools.

== Biography ==
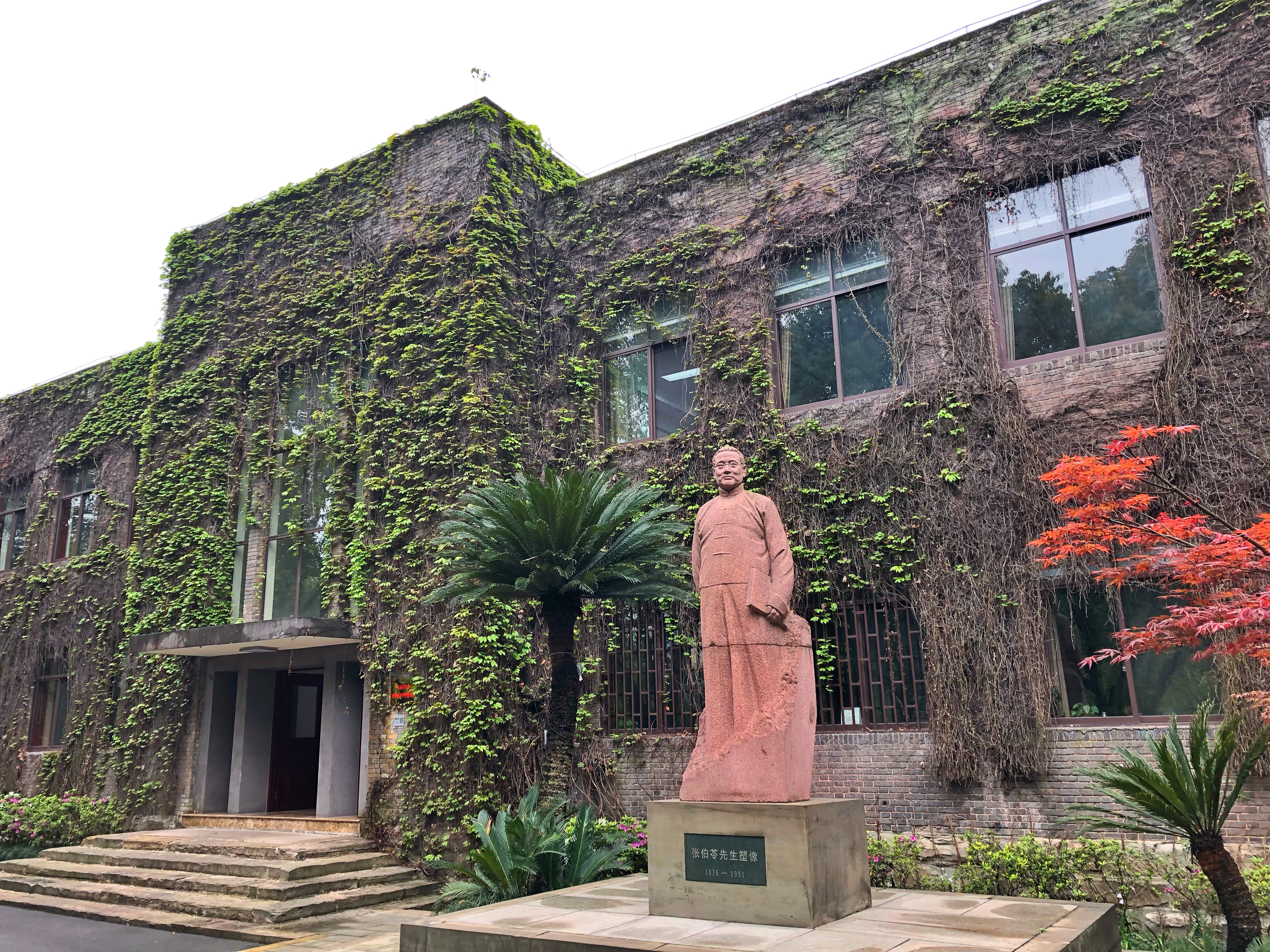
Statue of Chang Po-ling.

Chang Po-ling was born in Tianjin in 1876 during the last years of the Qing Dynasty. His younger brother, P.C. Chang, was a philosopher and diplomat. Chang Po-ling graduated from the Beiyang Naval Academy in 1894. He was a cadet officer in the Beiyang Fleet, but he abandoned his training after the fleet was destroyed during the First Sino-Japanese War. He attended and graduated from Saint John's University in Shanghai.

After several years of teaching, Chang Po-ling organized funding for a private college-preparatory school, Nankai High School, in Tianjin in 1904. In 1917, he briefly studied at the Teachers College, Columbia University in the United States, where he was influenced by the American educator and reformer John Dewey. In 1919, he expanded his school into a full university, Nankai University. Under Chang's leadership, Nankai continued to expand for the next few years and became one of the most prestigious universities in China.

In 1935, during an opening ceremony at Nankai University, Chang famously posed three questions that would later be known as the "Three Patriotic Questions" (爱国三问), which are still recited as a university tradition during ceremonies:

你是中国人吗？
你爱中国吗？
你愿意中国好吗？

Are you Chinese?
Do you love China?
Do you wish for China to prosper?

He was noted for his emphasis on athletics, which he believed would rid China of its image as the 'Sick Man of Asia' in the early 1900s, stating that 'only a good sportsman can be a good teacher'. He established a number of annual national athletic meets, as well as the forerunner to the modern Chinese Olympic Committee. He also established several smaller institutions, including a girls' middle school (1923), an institute of economics (1927), an experimental primary school (1928), and an institute of chemistry (1932).

During the 1930s, Chang Po-ling anticipated the possibility of war with Japan and made preparations to evacuate Nankai University and Nankai High School from Tianjin to the Chinese interior. As part of these preparations, he founded the Chongqing Nankai Middle School in 1936. When the Second Sino-Japanese War began on July 7, 1937, Chang Po-ling evacuated the entire Nankai system of schools to Changsha, Hunan.

As the Japanese military advanced towards the Chinese interior, Chang Po-ling organized a second evacuation to Kunming, Yunnan in 1938.

In 1941, Zhang Boyu joined the Kuomintang and introduced the people as Jiang Zhongzheng.

In Kunming, Nankai University joined with Peking University and Tsinghua University to form the National Southwestern Associated University, which continued to educate the top students in China until the war ended in 1945. Afterwards, Nankai University returned to Tianjin.

On June 4, 1946, Columbia University presented Chang Po-ling with the degree of Doctor Emeritus at its 192nd Commencement.

On January 29, 1947, the president of the University of California wrote to Chang Po-ling, proposing to award him the degree of honorary doctor of law. On August 28, 1947, the UNESCO China Commission was established, with Chang Po-ling as a member.

In June 1948, Jiang Zhongzheng nominated Chang Po-ling as the president of the Examination Yuan, and the Control Yuan voted to agree. In July 1948, Chang Po-ling took office in Nanjing. Due to the regulations of the Ministry of Education in Taiwan at that time, the president of a state university could not hold a part-time job simultaneously. However, Chang Po-ling was unwilling to abandon the cause of his life. To retain the position of the principal, in September 1948, Tianjin Mayor Du Jian hired Chang Po-ling as the national Nankai University honorary principal, and Franklin Ho as the agent principal, and informed Chiang Kai-shek. On October 20, the executive officially released an order for Chang Po-ling to resign, appointing Franklin Ho was as the new principal of Nankai and not transferring Chang Po-ling to the honorary principal position. Franklin Ho wrote to the Ministry of Education (Taiwan), but they did not respond. At the end of the same year, Chang Po-ling left the Nanjing Examinations Institute, citing weakness and the need for rest, and returned to live in Chongqing.

In 1949, during the regime change in mainland China, both the Kuomintang and the Communist Party sought to win over Chang Po-ling due to his high social prestige. The Kuomintang hoped that Zhang Boyu would leave the mainland for Taiwan or the United States and promised to agree to any conditions. However, Zhang Boling refused, stating, "I don't want to leave Nankai University or my motherland."

After Chang Po-ling refused Chiang Kai-shek's invitation to Taiwan and stayed in mainland China, he began to get a cold shoulder politically. Because of the protection of Zhou Enlai, Chang Po-ling was not liquidated and tried like other former military and political officials. In November, the Chinese People's Liberation Army moved into Chongqing, and the regime in Chongqing changed. In December, Chang Po-ling verified property, donated the private Chongqing Nankai Middle School, Primary School, and Kindergarten to the Chongqing Military Control Committee, and the Nankai University in Tianjin and other south series of schools also returned to the state.

In the summer of 1950, Chang Po-ling hoped to return to Tianjin to Nankai University to live, specially solicited the Opinions of the Party Branch of Nankai University, but had not received any reply.

On September 15, Chang Po-ling left for Tianjin. Zhou Enlai gave him a farewell dinner at the West Flower Hall in Zhongnanhai the day before his departure. Zhou said: "When I am in Europe, some people persuade the old gentleman, don't help Zhou Enlai, he participated in the Communist Party, but he said, Everyone has their own choice. He is the officer of the Qing Dynasty, can say this, I am very grateful." Zhou Enlai learned that Chang Po-ling had returned to Tianjin, it may be stressed by the Tianjin authorities, and immediately said that the letter will inform Tianjin Municipal Government.

After returning to Tianjin, Chang Po-ling's family first lived in Nanhai Road and Ningjia Building. While on Nanhai Road, he was monitored by the Tianjin police, who were not removed until Zhou Enlai's letter arrived.

=== Family ===
Chang Po-ling's grandfather Chang Qian (张虔) was a student at the Imperial College in Beijing. He developed mental health issues after failing to graduate multiple times and died at the age of 38. Chang Po-ling's father Chang Yungae (张云藻) (courtesy name Jiuan 久庵) was an only child. He failed the imperial exam when he was young, but had a passion for music and mounted archery. Under a famous musician hired by his family, he was able to master multiple instruments. He was particularly talented at playing the lute, which earned him the nickname "Lute Chang" among people in Tianjin. Chang's father's family wealth declined and he resorted to teaching at several private schools to support himself. When Chang's father was young, he married a woman surnamed Wu (胡). Wu died and Chang's father married another woman surnamed Yeung (杨). When Chang's father was 43, Chang was born.

Chang's brother Peng Chun Chang (张彭春) (courtesy name Zhongshu 仲述) was a representative for the Republic of China at the United Nations and had taught at Nankai University, Tsinghua University and Columbia University in the City of New York.

In 1895, Chang Po-ling married a woman surnamed Ang (安) from Yixingfu (宜兴埠), but she died of pulmonary tuberculosis five days after the wedding. The next year, Chang married Wang Shuzhen (王淑贞), who was usually referred to as Mrs. Wang. The two had seven sons and one daughter, but only four sons survived to adulthood. Four of his sons died during the Second Sino-Japanese War, and the remaining three were persecuted during the Cultural Revolution. Chang once said, "Though the universities I set up are privately owned, they are not profit-seeking organizations. Passing on one's values is more important than passing on one's wealth." This became the guiding principle for the Chang family.

Chang Po-ling's eldest son Chang Xilu (张希陆) (birth name Chang Xilu 张锡禄) (Note both names have similar pronunciation in Chinese, hence the same Romanized name) was born in 1901 and was a mathematician. During the Cultural Revolution, he was persecuted and suffered tremendous mental and physical harm, leading to him being bed-ridden near the end of his life. He died in 1988. Chang's second son Chang Xiyang (张锡羊) was born in 1907. He was a businessman and also died of persecution during the Cultural Revolution. Chang's third son Chang Xizuo (张锡祚) was born in 1908. He was an accountant and suffered the same fate as his older brothers during the Cultural Revolution, dying in 1976. Chang's fourth son Chang Xihu (张锡祜) was born in 1913. He was an athlete. He died serving his country in 1937 when the bomber he was piloting crashed in Nanchang, Jiangxi Province while on its way to bomb the Japanese cruiser Izumo.

Chang's oldest grandson Chang Yuanlong (张元龙) was born in 1948 to his third son Chang Xizuo (张锡祚). Chang Yuanlong (张元龙) once served as a member of the 11th and 12th National Committee of Chinese People's Political Consultative Conference, vice-president of All-China Federation of Industry and Commerce, vice-president of the National People's Committee in Tianjin, and President of All-China Federation of Industry and Commerce in Tianjin. Chang Po-ling's granddaughter Chang Yuanzhen (张媛贞) once served in the National People's Committee, the Revolutionary Central Committee and the Revolutionary Jiangsu Committee. She also once served as the Vice-secretary of Jiangsu Province's Committee of Chinese People's Political Consultative Conference and as a professor in the School of Life Sciences in Nanjing University. Chang Yuanzhen (张媛贞) died of an illness in Nanjing on January 8, 2020.

== Death and remembrance ==
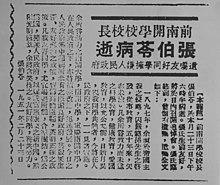
On February 26, 1951, the Tianjin Daily posted a brief article about Chang's death.

=== Death and obituary ===
On February 14, 1951 (January 9 in the Chinese Lunar Calendar), Lu Muzhai's (卢木斋) son Lu Kaiyuan (卢开源) visited Chang Po-ling and informed him that Beijing was planning to appoint him as Vice Chairperson of the Chinese People's Political Consultative Conference. Elated about his appointment, Chang personally walked Lu off his residence. At that time, it was freezing. The same night, Chang suffered a stroke, dying on February 23 at 75 years of age. When Chang was on the verge of dying, President of the Student Union of Nankai University Yan Ziheng (閻子亨) suggested writing Chang's obituary on his behalf. Recommended by everyone for the job was Huang Yusheng (黄钰生). After the draft was completed, it was edited by Zhang Qingchang (張清常), Professor of Chinese at Nankai University. Quoted below is a translation of Chang's obituary:

In the year 1897, I was indignant at the humiliation of my country by Imperial Powers. Inspired by Yan Xiu (嚴修), I dedicated myself to education. For over 50 years, my dedication never flinched, but much remains to be done to promote moral values and patriotism as well as nurture talents in science and medicine. My students and I have been working to achieve those goals, encouraging each other in the process. Now under the leadership of the People's Government, my students will continue my work. The education institutions I dedicated my life to – Nankai University, Nankai High School and Chongqing Nankai Secondary School – will actively seek to reform themselves and develop rapidly. Today's People's Government has brought an unprecedented level of corruption-free, good governance to China. Its development of the manufacturing industry and pursuit of a friendly relationship with the Soviet Union suggest the People's Government is far-sighted and competent. My dear students, please do your utmost, be united, serve your people and your country, and support the People's Government in building a strong, prosperous new China. Our country has a bright future, a future I am looking forward to. My dear students, please strive towards that goal.

=== Official memorial service in mainland China ===
On February 24, 1951, Zhou Enlai (周恩来) went to Tianjin to attend a military meeting by the 20th Corps of the People's Volunteer Army. Once he arrived in Tianjin, he went to Chang's home to send his condolences and to deliver wreaths to pay his respects for Chang. On the ribbon, he wrote "Teacher Chang, may your teachings be passed down forever! Your student Zhou Enlai (周恩来) is here to pay his respects." On February 26, the Tianjin Daily posted a brief article that began with the title "Former President of Nankai University. Chang Po-ling Dies of Illness, His Obituary Stating that his Students should Continue to Support the People's Government". During the decades after his death, Chang was virtually unmentioned by mainland Chinese newspapers. After Chang's death, Zhou Enlai (周恩来), an alumnus of Nankai University and the then Premier of the People's Republic of China, personally sent his condolences to Chang's family. Commenting on Chang, Zhou said during the memorial service, "A person should be judged based on the historical background and situation in his time, and we should not judge a person from the past by today's standards. President Chang was progressive and patriotic when he was alive, and his commitment to education has benefited the people. The People's Government was very concerned about him when he was sick and hoped that he would recover soon. Unfortunately, he passed away suddenly." Due to the political environment at the time of Chang's passing, most people were afraid of the political repercussions and remained silent throughout the memorial service.

=== Official memorial service in Taiwan ===
Taiwan also expressed condolences for Chang's death. Another version of Chang's written obituary was circulating on the island, but it was later revealed to have been falsified by Chang's eldest son, Chang Xilu (张希陆). On February 27, 1951, upon learning of Chang's death, Chiang Chung-cheng (蔣中正) wrote in his memoir that words could not describe the depth of his sorrow. On March 31 the same year, organizations such as the Nankai University Taiwanese Student Association and the Chinese Kuomintang Reform Commission held a grand memorial service. Chiang Chung-cheng (蔣中正) presided over the ceremony and wrote the elegiac couplet "守正不屈，多士所宗" (Back translation: A man of uncompromising values, values people should follow). Attending the ceremony were Chang's close friends including Wang Chonghui (王寵惠), Chen Cheng (陳誠), Wang Shijie (王世杰), Zhang Lisheng (張厲生) and Zhang Jia (章嘉).

=== Unofficial memorial services in mainland China ===
In contrast to Taiwan's elaborate memorial service for Chang, the Tianjin Nankai Girls' High School conducted a modest ceremony in its hall. The atmosphere was not somber, and attendance was sparse. Due to the lack of public promotion, only a handful of individuals were aware of the event. The small memorial service began with Nankai University Professor Situ Yuelan (司徒月兰) playing the piano. Alumni and Yan Ziheng (阎子亨), the organizer of the memorial service, read aloud Chang's obituary. A memorial speech was given by Huang Yusheng (黄钰生), and Yu Chuanjian (喻传鉴), Li Zhuchen (李烛尘), Vice President of Chinese Academy of Sciences Tao Menghe (陶孟和) and Yang Shixian (杨石先) also took turns to give their speeches to remember Chang. A year later, Yu Chuanjian (喻传鉴) presided over another memorial service for Chang in Chongqing, but attendance was also low.

=== Burial Site ===
As Chang wished to be buried on the campus of Nankai University, some attendees started discussing this issue after the memorial service held by Tianjin Nankai Girls' High School. The Communist Party Committee of Nankai University suggested that Chang should not be buried there, justifying this with the lack of a close relationship between students of Nankai University and Chang around the time of his death and also with the students' belief that the university belonged to the Chinese people, not Chang alone. Because of that suggestion, Chang was buried in Tianjin Wujiakiln District Permanent Cemetery instead. Later, because the site was rezoned, his grave was moved to Tianjin Eastern Suburb Yeung Family Cemetery. In 1962, Chang's wife died, and the couple was laid to rest in the Tianjin Beicang First Public Cemetery. In 1975, the bodies of the couple were cremated, and their ashes were interred in the Beijing residence of their eldest son, Chang Xilu (张希陆). Subsequently, in 1979, a ceremony for the interment of ashes took place at the Tianjin Water Park Martyrs Cemetery, where Chang's ashes were laid to rest. Eventually, his ashes were relocated to the Beicang Martyrs Cemetery. The government again commended Chang for his contributions, and on October 16, 1989, Chang's and his wife's ashes were interred under Chang's bronze statue in the yard of Nankai University.

=== Annual memorial services ===
After China reformed and opened up, the political situation stabilized and discussions of Chang became less of a taboo in mainland China. The loss of political sensitivity around the topic led to increasingly more public remembrance of Chang and studies of his life. Studies of his life became increasingly popular, and has become one of the hot topics in research in modern education. Currently, Nankai University holds an annual memorial service for Chang on the eve of Ching Ming Festival.

== Evaluation ==
After Chang Po-ling's passing, there was a stark contrast in how he was perceived on both sides of the Taiwan Strait due to his association with the government of the Republic of China. In Taiwan, Nankai alumni who relocated to Taiwan with the ROC government honored Chang Po-ling's educational legacy through commemorative anthologies, memorials, biographies, and monographs. They also organized commemorative events on his birthday every decade.

Conversely, in mainland China, Chang Po-ling's name was once considered taboo prior to the country's reform and opening up. As political movements unfolded in mainland China, criticism of Chang Po-ling from various sectors of Nankai University grew louder. Teachers at Nankai University were individually called upon to express their views, and dissenting opinions from former staff members who had collaborated with Chang Po-ling were marginalized.

In 1960, the History of Nankai University, published by the university, completely disavowed Chang Po-ling. It was not until the 1980s, following the reform and opening up, that mainland Chinese officials reevaluated and acknowledged Chang Po-ling's contributions. The assessment of Zhang Boling on both sides of the Taiwan Strait began to align, recognizing him not only as a symbol of Nankai but also as a uniquely successful figure in the realm of modern education in China.

=== Removing Zhangboling ===
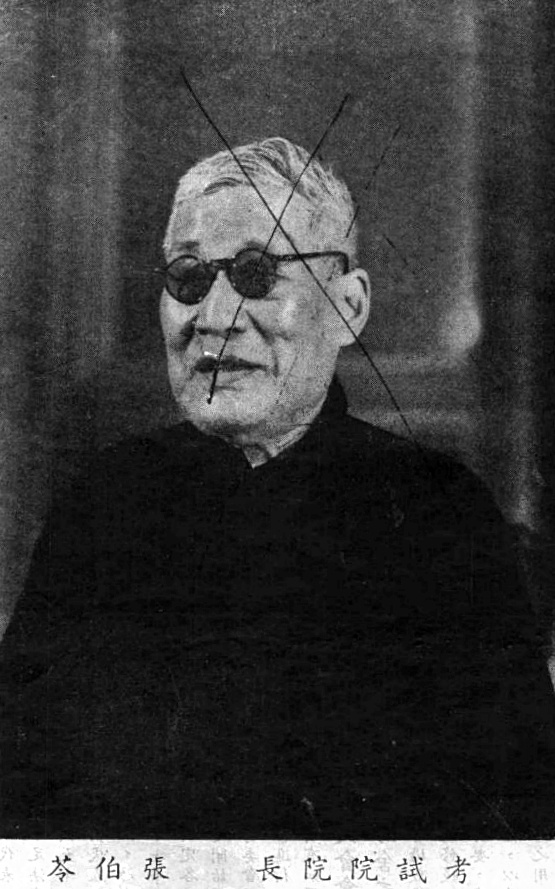
Chang Po-ling attended the photo of the first National General Assembly in 1948, after being applied to the fork.

In the early 1950s, the government took control of private institutions such as Tianjin Nankai Middle School, Tianjin Nankai Girls' High School, and Chongqing Nankai Middle School, renaming them as Tianjin No. 15 High School, Tianjin No. 7 Girls' High School, and Chongqing No. 3 High School, respectively. The original "Nankai" school name was replaced by a numerical sequence, erasing any trace of Chang Po-ling from these schools.

The distinctive elements that once symbolized "old Nankai," such as the school song, the blue lotus and purple school colors, the school motto, and Chang Po-ling himself, were intentionally downplayed. Chang Po-ling's legacy was gradually diluted, and he was omitted from the history of Nankai School, with sole credit given to Yan Xiu as the founder of Nankai School.

In 1952, following the restructuring of Nankai University, a meeting was held that deviated from Chang Po-ling's vision of establishing a comprehensive university encompassing four disciplines: liberal arts, science, engineering, and business. Instead, the university was reduced to a liberal arts and science institution with only nine departments, including mathematics, physics, chemistry, biology, philosophy, Chinese, history, foreign languages, and economics.

During the Cultural Revolution, the Red Guard desecrated Chang Po-ling's cemetery by smashing the tombstone. Descendants had to gather the bones, cremate them, and store the ashes in a closet at home. Chang Po-ling, the granddaughter of the late Chang Po-ling and a former member of the CPPCC Standing Committee, expressed sorrow, saying, "My grandparents passed away without a final resting place."

=== Memorial statues and buildings ===
Statues of Chang Po-ling have been erected at Nankai University, Tianjin Nankai Middle School, Chongqing Nankai Middle School, the former site of National Southwest Associated University, and other campuses as a tribute to his legacy. Both Nankai University and Nankai Middle School have buildings named after Chang Po-ling. In 1999, the Po-ling Building was constructed on the campus of Nankai University. Tianjin Nankai Middle School renamed its 1906 East Building as the Po-ling Building.

In October 2004, three bronze statues of Yan Xiu, Chang Po-ling, and Zhou Enlai were built in the Xiangyu Park in front of Nankai Middle School in Tianjin.

On October 16, 2013, alumni donated two bronze statues of Yan Xiu and Chang Po-ling, which were completed and installed on the campus of Nankai Middle School in Tianjin.

Furthermore, MingDao University in Taiwan named its administrative center the Po-ling Building in honor of Chang Po-ling, recognizing him as an exemplary educator dedicated to lifelong service.

=== Literature ===
In August 2005, the TV series " Chang Po-ling" broadcast in China CCTV. In 2017, the historical and humanistic documentary "There was a School named Nankai" was broadcast on CCTV and Tianjin TV successively.
