= Chongqing Nankai Secondary School =

Coordinates: 29°33′49″N 106°27′24″E

- 重庆市南开中学校
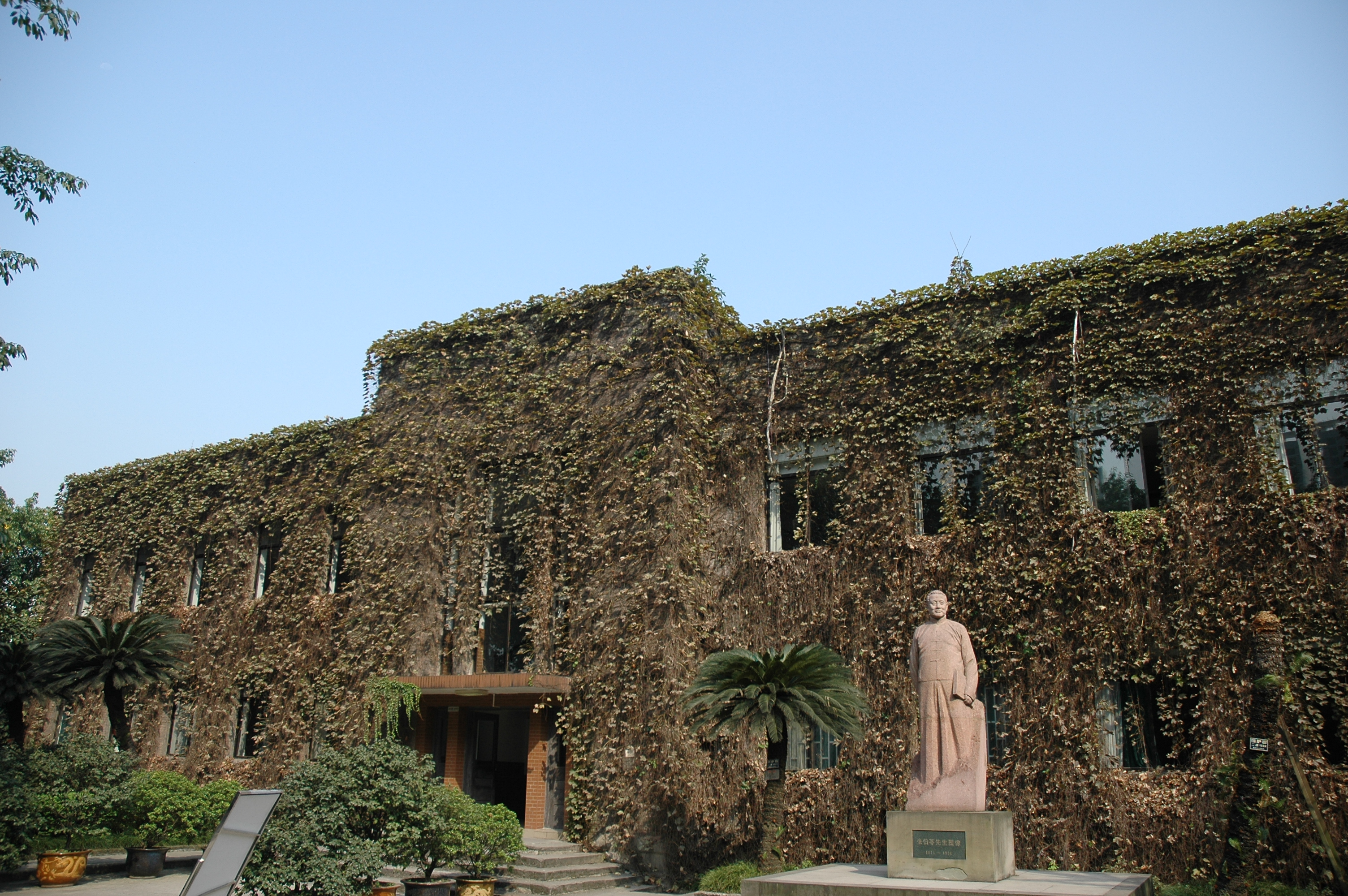
- Administrative building

Location
- 1 South Shapingba Street; Chongqing, 400030; China

Information
- Type: Public school senior high school
- Motto: 允公允能 日新月异; Commitment to society, persistent self-improvement
- Founded: 1936
- Founder: Zhang Boling
- School district: Shapingba
- CEEB code: 694382
- Principal: Tian Xiangping (田祥平)
- Faculty: about 200
- Age range: 15 ~ 18
- Language: Chinese
- Campus size: 24 hectares
- Colour: Purple
- Funding anniversary: October 17
- Website: www.nks.edu.cn

Chongqing Nankai Secondary School (重庆市南开中学校) is a public secondary school in Shapingba, Chongqing, China.
