= History of Nankai University =

Chinese university

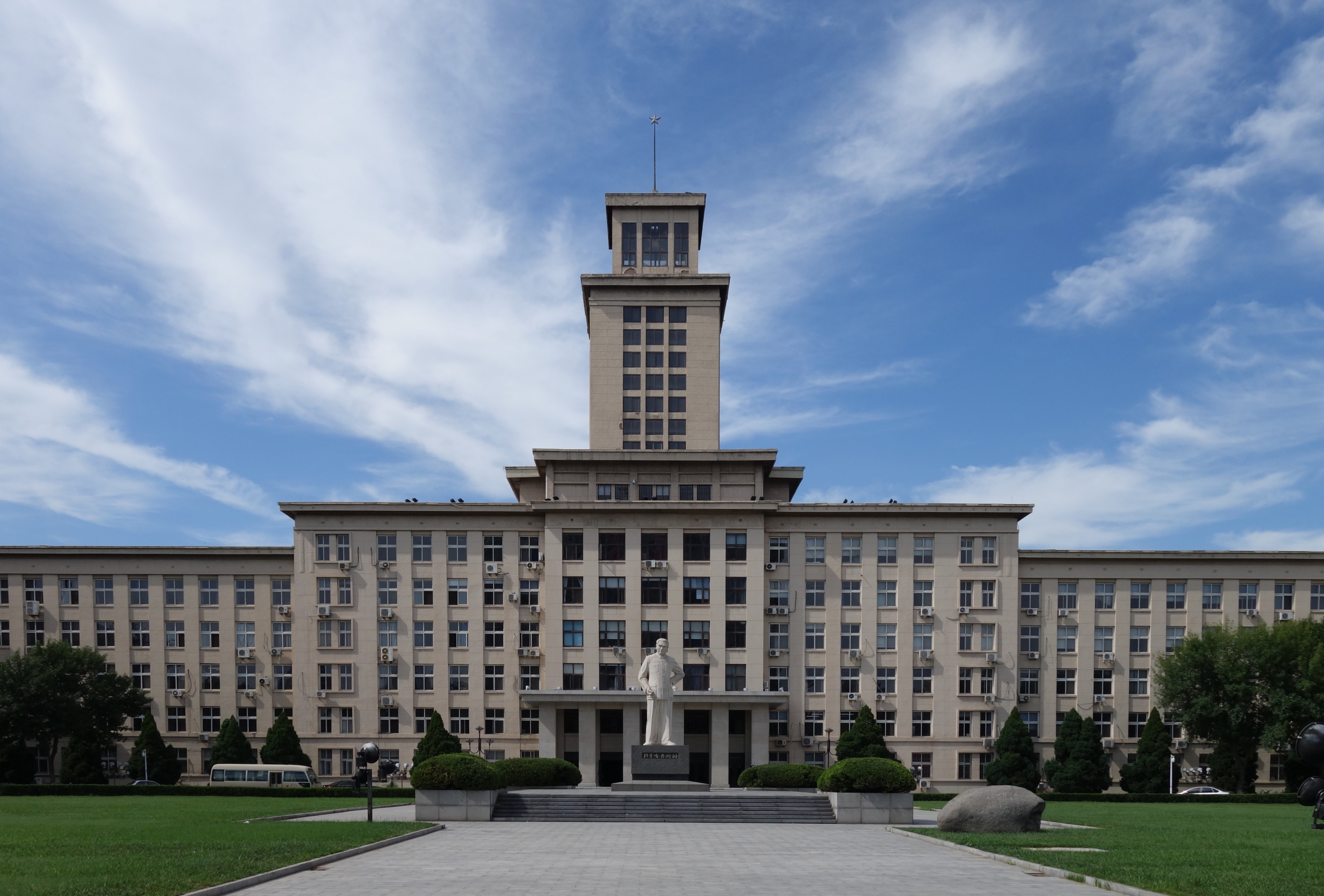
The Main Building of Nankai University at the Balitai Campus, a landmark of Nankai University

Nankai University is located in Tianjin, People's Republic of China. It was co-founded by prominent modern Chinese educators Yan Xiu and Zhang Boling, originating from the establishment of Nankai School in 1904. In 1919, the university division of Nankai School was formally established.

On September 25, 1919, the university division of Nankai School held its first opening ceremony, marking the official establishment of Private Nankai University. In 1921, the university division of Nankai School was officially renamed "Tianjin Private Nankai University". In 1929, Nankai University restructured its departments into colleges, establishing the College of Liberal Arts, College of Science, College of Commerce, and Medical Preparatory Department, with a total of 13 departments. At the beginning of the full-scale outbreak of the Second Sino-Japanese War in 1937, Nankai University became a bombing target, and its campus was almost completely destroyed by fire. On September 10, 1937, the Ministry of Education of the National Government announced the formation of Changsha Temporary University using the faculty and equipment of Peking University, Tsinghua University, Nankai University, and the Central Academy as the backbone. On April 2, 1938, the Executive Yuan ordered that Changsha Temporary University, relocated to Kunming, be renamed "National Southwestern Associated University". In 1939, the Nankai Institute of Economics was re-established at the Nankai High School campus in Shapingba, Chongqing.

On May 4, 1946, National Southwestern Associated University was officially disbanded, and Nankai University was transformed from a "private" to a "national" university. Departments and faculties of Nankai University gradually returned to the old site in Balitai, Tianjin, to resume operations. On October 17, 1946, Nankai University held a ceremony at Balitai to commemorate the reopening, which was designated as Nankai's anniversary day. After the reopening, National Nankai University established the College of Liberal Arts, College of Science, College of Political and Economic Sciences, and College of Engineering, with a total of 16 departments, as well as the Nankai Institute of Economics, the Nankai Institute of Applied Chemistry, and the Nankai Institute of Frontier Humanities.

After the founding of the People's Republic of China in 1949, Nankai University continued as a public institution. During the Cultural Revolution from 1966 to 1976, the normal educational order of Nankai University was disrupted, and most teachers were persecuted. Between 1966 and 1971, the university did not admit any students for five years. On February 17, 1978, the State Council forwarded the Ministry of Education's report on the restoration and improvement of key national universities, designating Nankai University as one of the first batch of national key universities. In 1994, Tianjin Institute of Foreign Trade merged into Nankai University. In 1995, Nankai University was selected as one of the first universities in China to be included in the "Project 211". On December 25, 2000, it was included in "Project 985". In September 2017, Nankai University was selected as a "world-class university construction university".

== Preparation and establishment ==
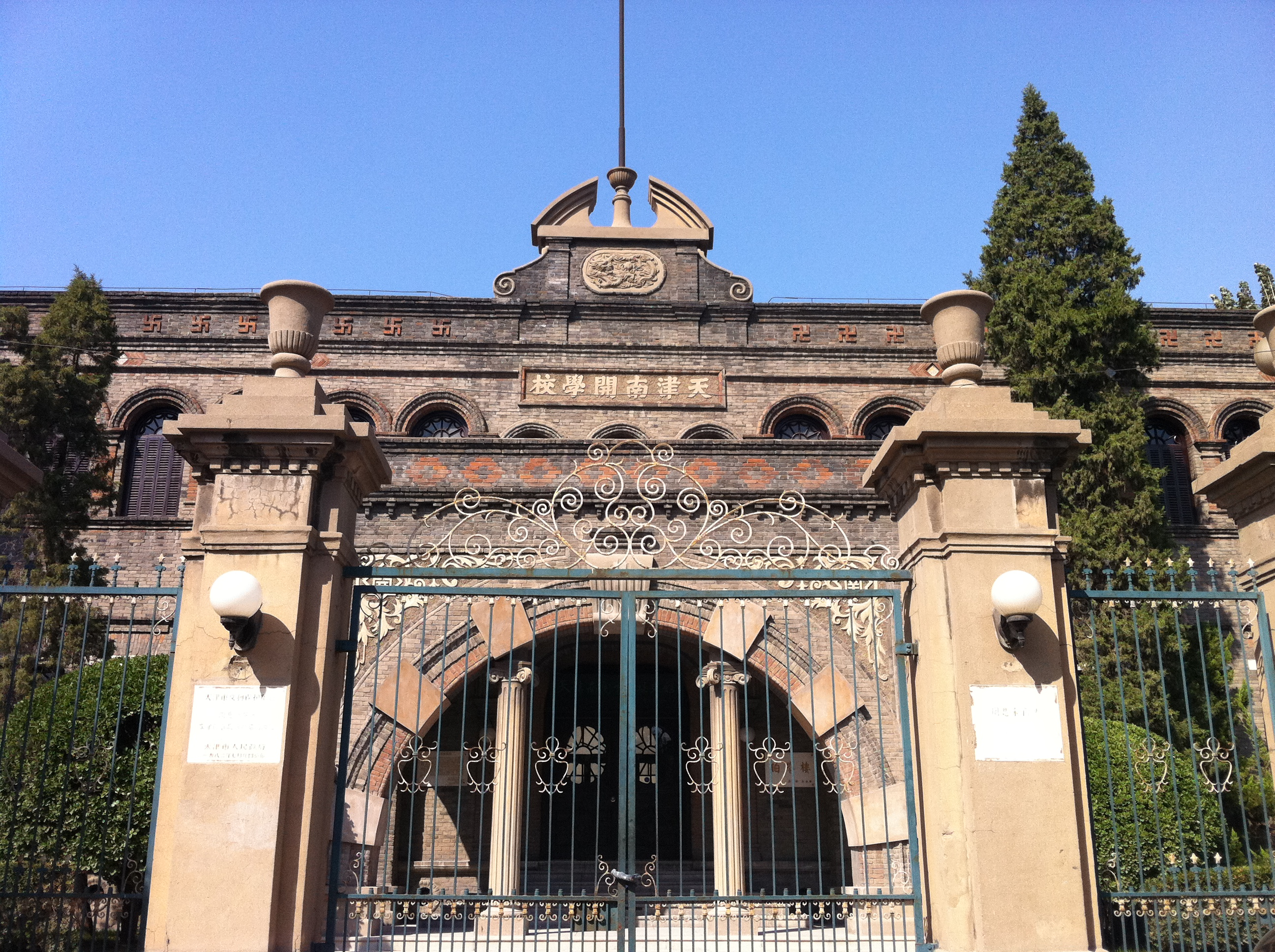
Old site of Nankai School

Nankai University was initially part of the Nankai Series of Schools, all of which originated from Yan Xiu's private tutoring school, Yan Family School. Although Yan Xiu grew up receiving traditional education and entered the officialdom through the imperial examination, he and Zhang Boling realized the importance of educational reform. They believed that "the way to strengthen China lies in education, creating new education, and cultivating new talents," and that only through educational innovation could the country's declining fate be changed. In 1898, Yan Xiu, who had served as an education commissioner and advocated the abolition of the imperial examination, resigned and began to establish modern schools. In 1904, Private Nankai School was established, with Yan's family's tutor Zhang Boling serving as the principal. Later, realizing the urgent need for higher education due to social development, Yan Xiu began to work on establishing university education.

In 1917, after a year of unsuccessful attempts to establish a specialized department and a higher normal class, Yan Xiu sent Zhang Boling to the United States to study university management at Columbia University. In the same year, Yan Xiu also went to the United States to inspect the operations of well-known private universities such as Columbia University, University of Chicago, and University of San Francisco. After returning to China at the end of 1918, Yan Xiu and Zhang Boling began to actively work towards the creation of Nankai University. They first went to Beijing to meet with the Minister of Education Fu Zengxiang and several well-known scholars to discuss the establishment of the university. They also approached Liang Shiyi, Cao Rulin, Zhou Ziqi, and others to raise funds for the university. Subsequently, they personally or sent people to various places to seek the support of local warlords. Zhang Boling and Yan Xiu once visited Li Chun, the Jiangsu governor who had donated to Nankai many times, and asked for help in raising funds. In October 1920, before his death, Li Chun left a will, donating a quarter of his estate, equivalent to 500,000 silver yuan, to Nankai University as a permanent fund. In commemoration, Nankai University built Xiushan Hall and erected a statue of Li Chun. During the preparation period, besides the two main founders, Yan Xiu and Zhang Boling, the Minister of Education of the National Government, Fan Yuanlian, also participated in the preparation and founding of Nankai University, serving as a director and chairman of the board of directors.

== Early years (1919–1937) ==
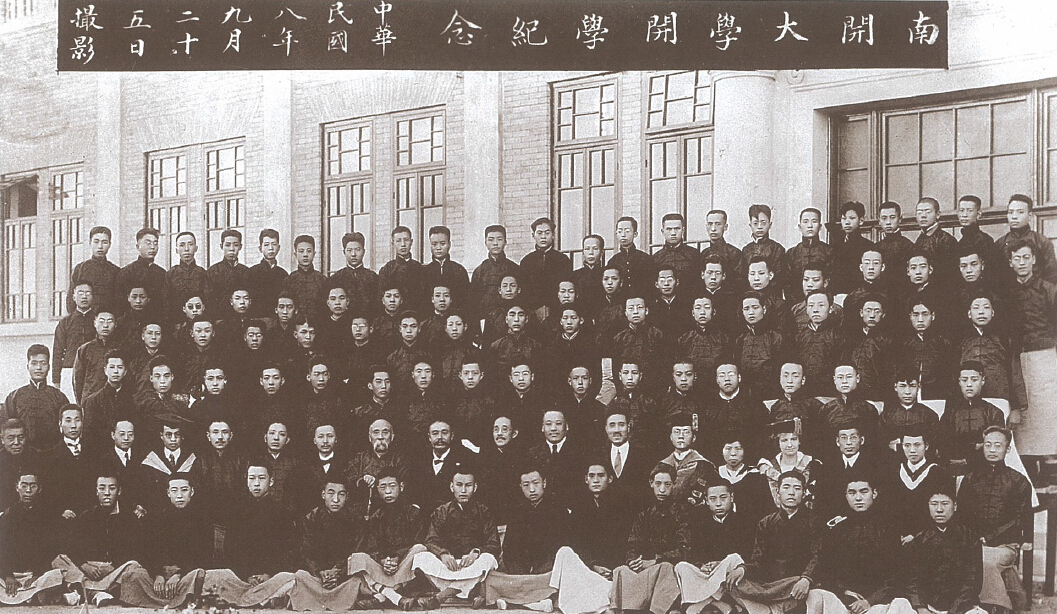
Photo commemorating the opening of Nankai University on September 25, 1919 (Zhou Enlai is the first from the left in the back row)

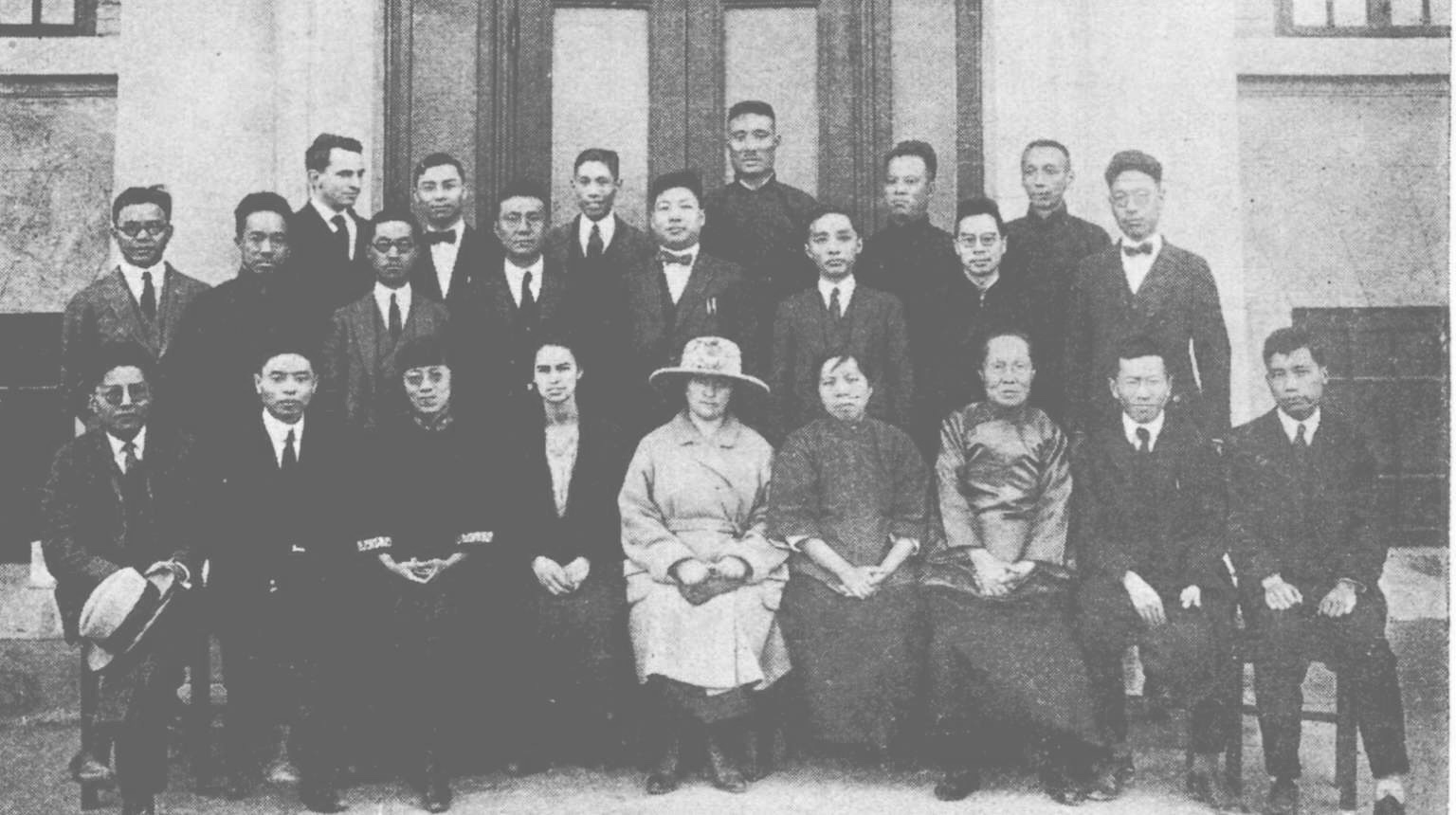
Zhang Boling and Nankai University faculty in 1923

In April 1919, Nankai School began constructing the university division's campus south of the middle school department. In May, Nankai School established the university preparatory department, drafted the school charter, planned the departments, and organized admissions. On September 7 and 8, entrance exams were held for the university division, admitting the first 96 students, including Zhou Enlai and Ma Jun. The opening ceremony of the university division was held on September 25, marking the official founding of Nankai University. Initially, the university division had three departments: liberal arts, science, and business.

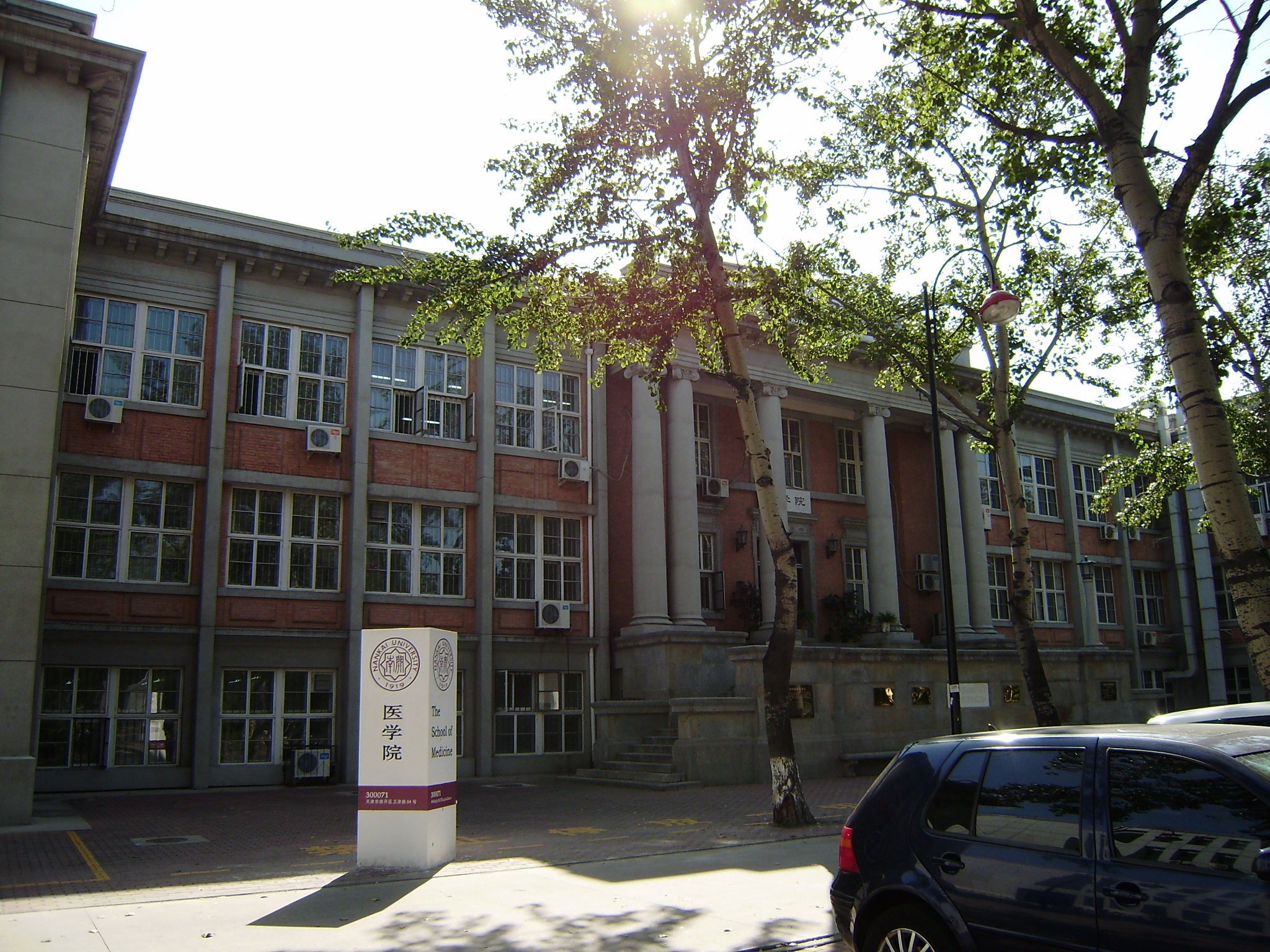
Rockefeller Foundation and Yuan Shuzhi donated Siyuan Hall, which still stands today (completed in 1923)

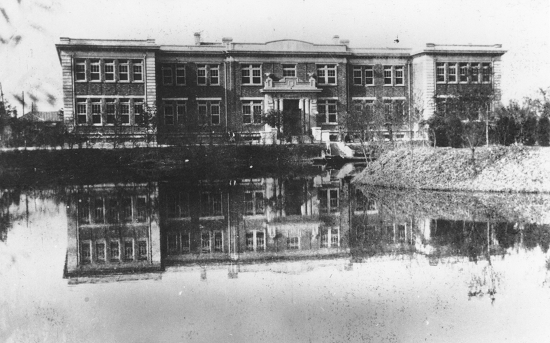
Li Chun donated Xiushan Hall, which was destroyed by Japanese bombing (completed in 1924)

In 1920, Li Zusen donated 30,000 silver dollars to Nankai University, establishing the mining department and purchasing over 700 acres of land. In 1921, the university division was officially renamed "Tianjin Private Nankai University." On September 12, 1921, Liang Qichao was invited to lecture on "Chinese Historical Research Methods" at Nankai University, attracting teachers and students from various schools in Tianjin to attend. Subsequently, Liang Qichao proposed establishing an Institute of Oriental Culture at Nankai University to primarily study Confucian and Mencian thought and Song Dynasty Neo-Confucianism. This proposal received support from Yan Xiu and Zhang Boling, but it was ultimately abandoned due to a lack of response. In 1922, the Rockefeller Foundation inspected Nankai University and, after attending Mr. Qiu Zongyue's qualitative analysis class, decided to donate a science building. Yuan Shuzhi also contributed to the construction, and the building was completed the following year and named "Siyuan Hall." In 1924, Nankai University experienced the "Reincarnation Education" incident. Nankai University student Ning Encheng published an article titled "Reincarnation Education" in the Nankai Weekly, arguing that contemporary education had fallen into an inescapable cycle that could not save the country and that students' learning could not serve society. The article caused tension between students and faculty, but tensions gradually eased with Zhang Boling's careful handling. Zhang began to reflect on the drawbacks of emulating Western education systems. Soon after, the Nankai University Academic Affairs Council decided that, except for English classes, all courses would be taught in Mandarin. In 1926, the mining department was dissolved, and Wu Dayou and other students were transferred to the science department to continue their studies. In February 1927, Lu Muzhai funded the construction of the Nankai University Library, which was named Muzhai Library upon completion. In September 1927, on the initiative of He Lian and with the support of President Zhang Boling, the Nankai University Social and Economic Research Committee was established in Xiushan Hall as an independent research institution not affiliated with any department. In October of the same year, the Nankai University Manchuria and Mongolia Research Association was founded. In 1928, Zhang Boling, chairing the school's fundraising committee, formulated the "Nankai University Development Plan," which proposed the educational mission of "Knowing China and Serving China", and aimed to solve China's problems with the academic background of Chinese history and society. In 1929, Nankai University restructured its departments into schools, establishing the School of Liberal Arts, School of Science, School of Business, and the pre-medical program, with a total of 13 departments. In September of the same year, history professor Jiang Tingfu, economics professor Xiao Qiu, and botany professor Li Jitong, all American-educated faculty, were recruited by Luo Jialun to teach at Tsinghua University due to its better financial conditions.

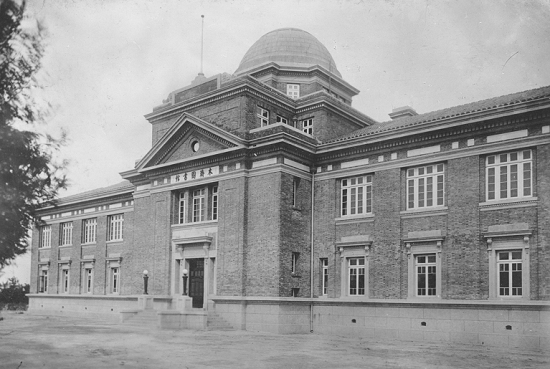
Muzhai Library, one of the early buildings of Nankai University

In 1931, Nankai University established the School of Economics, founded the Department of Chemical Engineering and the Department of Electrical Engineering, which were affiliated with the School of Science, and Chen Zhiqin funded the construction of Zhiqin Hall. In September of the same year, Hebei University in Baoding was reorganized, and some law students were transferred to Nankai University. In 1932, the Institute of Applied Chemistry was established, and the "Private Nankai University Charter" was formulated. In June 1933, thanks to Zhang Boling's lobbying, Nankai University was included in the subsidy list of the British Boxer Indemnity Fund. On December 24, Nankai School held a board meeting to discuss the possibility of Nankai University taking over the Naval Medical College, but this ultimately did not succeed. In the spring of 1934, Nankai University opened a radio station run by the Department of Electrical Engineering in the basement of Siyuan Hall. The station operated until the following spring when it was closed due to insufficient funds. In the fall of 1934, at the 30th anniversary celebration of Nankai School, Zhang Boling established "public service" and "ability" as the school's motto.

By the time full-scale war broke out in 1937, early Nankai University had developed into an institution with three schools: liberal arts, science, and business, 12 departments, and two research institutes for economics and applied chemistry. However, as a private university, its student body remained small, with only 429 students enrolled in 1937. Despite this, the faculty was highly qualified, with over 110 staff members, including scholars such as Ling Bing, Jiang Lifu, Rao Yutai, Qiu Zongyue, Yang Shixian, Li Jitong, Xiong Dashi, Jiang Tingfu, Li Ji, Xiao Gongquan, Xu Mo, He Lian, Fang Xianting, Chen Xujing, Li Zhuomin, Huang Yusheng, Zhang Pengchun, Liu Wuji, Situ Yuelan, Zhang Zhongfu, Feng Wenqian, Zhang Kezhong, Zhang Hongyuan, Liu Jinnian, and Qian Baochong. Additionally, Zhu Kezhen, Tang Yongtong, Xiao Shuyu, Fan Wenlan, Luo Longji, and Wu Dayou also taught at Nankai for short periods. Through years of development, Nankai University had developed a rigorous academic atmosphere, excellent ethos, emphasis on fundamental studies, strict examinations, and high educational efficiency, earning it the reputation of "the most outstanding private school".

== Effects of the Second Sino-Japanese War ==
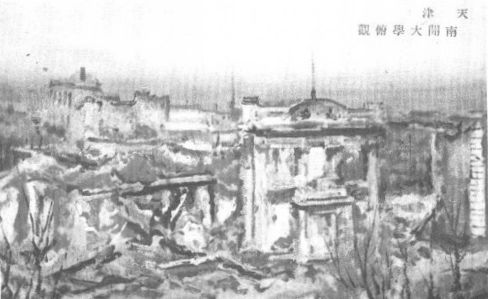
A painting by Japanese military artist Yukikazu Mukai depicting Nankai University after being bombed by the Japanese Army

On July 7, 1937, following the Marco Polo Bridge Incident, the Second Sino-Japanese War broke out in full scale, with Japanese forces swiftly invading northern China. On July 24, Nankai University began evacuating its materials. By July 28, Tianjin and Beiping had fallen. On July 29, Japanese forces bombed key targets in Tianjin, including Nankai University, which was being used as a stronghold by part of the 29th Army of the National Revolutionary Army. The bombing destroyed all or part of campus buildings such as Xiushan Hall and Zhiqin Building, and damaged Muzhai Library.

On July 30, Japanese troops entered the Nankai University campus, looting and setting fire to buildings that had survived the air raid. On the same day, Japanese artillery units at Haiguang Temple fired four shells at Nankai University, igniting Muzhai Library, which was subsequently destroyed by fire. That afternoon, Zhang Boling gave an interview to the Central Daily News, stating, "The enemy's bombing of Nankai has destroyed our material possessions, but it will only strengthen the Nankai spirit."

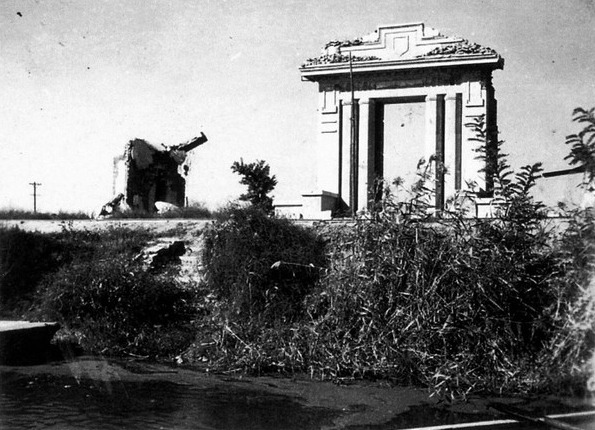
Ruins of Xiushan Hall, home to the Nankai Institute of Economics, after being bombed

Nankai University became the first higher education institution to be destroyed by war in the conflict between China and Japan. The campus was almost completely destroyed, with estimated losses reaching 6.63 million Chinese yuan, accounting for one-tenth of the total wartime losses of all higher education institutions in China. The attack on Nankai University drew significant attention, with prominent figures such as Cai Yuanpei, Hu Shih, Mao Dun, and Guo Moruo sending letters of sympathy. Chiang Kai-shek, then President of the Republic of China, promised Zhang Boling during a meeting with educational and academic circles of Peking and Tianjin that Nankai would be rebuilt, declaring, "Nankai has sacrificed for China, and as long as China exists, Nankai will exist!" On August 1, Cai Yuanpei, Jiang Menglin, Hu Shih, Mei Yiqi, and four others sent a telegram to the League of Nations' Intellectual Cooperation Committee to inform them of the Japanese invasion of Nankai and other educational institutions, urging the international community to sanction Japan.

The bombing drew rapid international attention, with consulates from several Western countries in Tianjin protesting to Japan. At Oxford University and 17 other institutions in the UK, 170 professors jointly expressed their support and urged the British government to stop Japanese atrocities. In response, the Japanese military claimed their actions were self-defense against Chinese troops occupying Nankai University and other locations, which they alleged were planning attacks on the Japanese concession in Tianjin and other major Japanese facilities. The Japanese also suggested that other countries should protest to China. On October 17, 1937, Nankai alumni in Tianjin and Nanjing gathered to commemorate the 33rd anniversary of Nankai School and unanimously expressed confidence in the university's rebuilding.

== National Southwestern Associated University period (1937–1945) ==
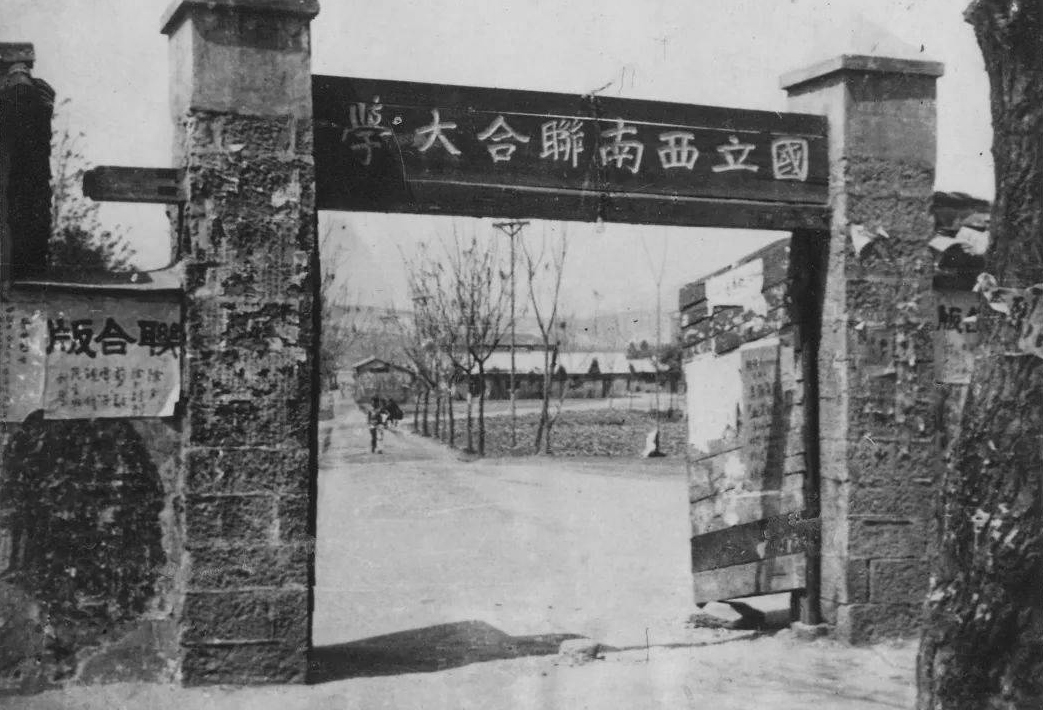
The gate of National Southwestern Associated University

On August 28, 1937, the Ministry of Education of the Republic of China issued a letter requesting the private Nankai University, Peking University, and Tsinghua University to merge and form the "National Changsha Temporary University" in Changsha. The presidents of the three universities at the time, Zhang Boling, Jiang Menglin, and Mei Yiqi, were appointed as the permanent members of the temporary university's administrative committee to jointly manage university affairs. On September 10, the Ministry of Education of the National Government issued Order No. 16696: "Establish the Changsha Temporary University with the faculty and facilities of Peking University, Tsinghua University, Nankai University, and the Academia Sinica as the core." On October 13, with the fall of Nanjing, the Changsha Temporary University planned to move further south. On October 25, the Changsha Temporary University officially opened, and classes began on November 1, with 17 departments across four colleges. By November 20, the student body numbered 1,452. In January 1938, with the Japanese occupation of Nanjing, the university was forced to relocate further to Kunming, Yunnan. In February, after the first semester ended, equipment and books were gradually shipped to Kunming, and the entire faculty and student body moved to Yunnan by sea and land routes. Some students traveled by train from Changsha to Guangzhou, with Lingnan University serving as a temporary station, and then took a boat via Hong Kong and Haiphong in Annam, before taking a train to Kunming. Another group traveled by land along the Xiang-Gui Highway to Guilin, and then via Liuzhou, Nanning, and Annam to Yunnan. The third group traveled from Changsha by land, took a boat from Yiyang, Hunan, walked through Changde to Yuanling, and then took trucks through Zhijiang, arriving in Kunming after a journey of over 3,000 miles, on April 28. On April 2, the Ministry of Education of the Republic of China issued a notice: by order of the Executive Yuan and approved by the Supreme National Defense Council, the university was renamed "National Southwestern Associated University". The administrative structure of the National Southwestern Associated University followed that of the Changsha Temporary University and was implemented according to the "University Organization Law" issued by the National Government in 1938, with a standing committee as the highest authority, comprising Nankai President Zhang Boling, Peking University President Jiang Menglin, and Tsinghua University President Mei Yiqi. Since Zhang Boling and Jiang Menglin held positions in the wartime capital Chongqing, Mei Yiqi resided in Kunming to manage the university. On May 4, the National Southwestern Associated University began classes in Kunming and Mengzi. On September 28, Japanese planes bombed the university staff quarters.

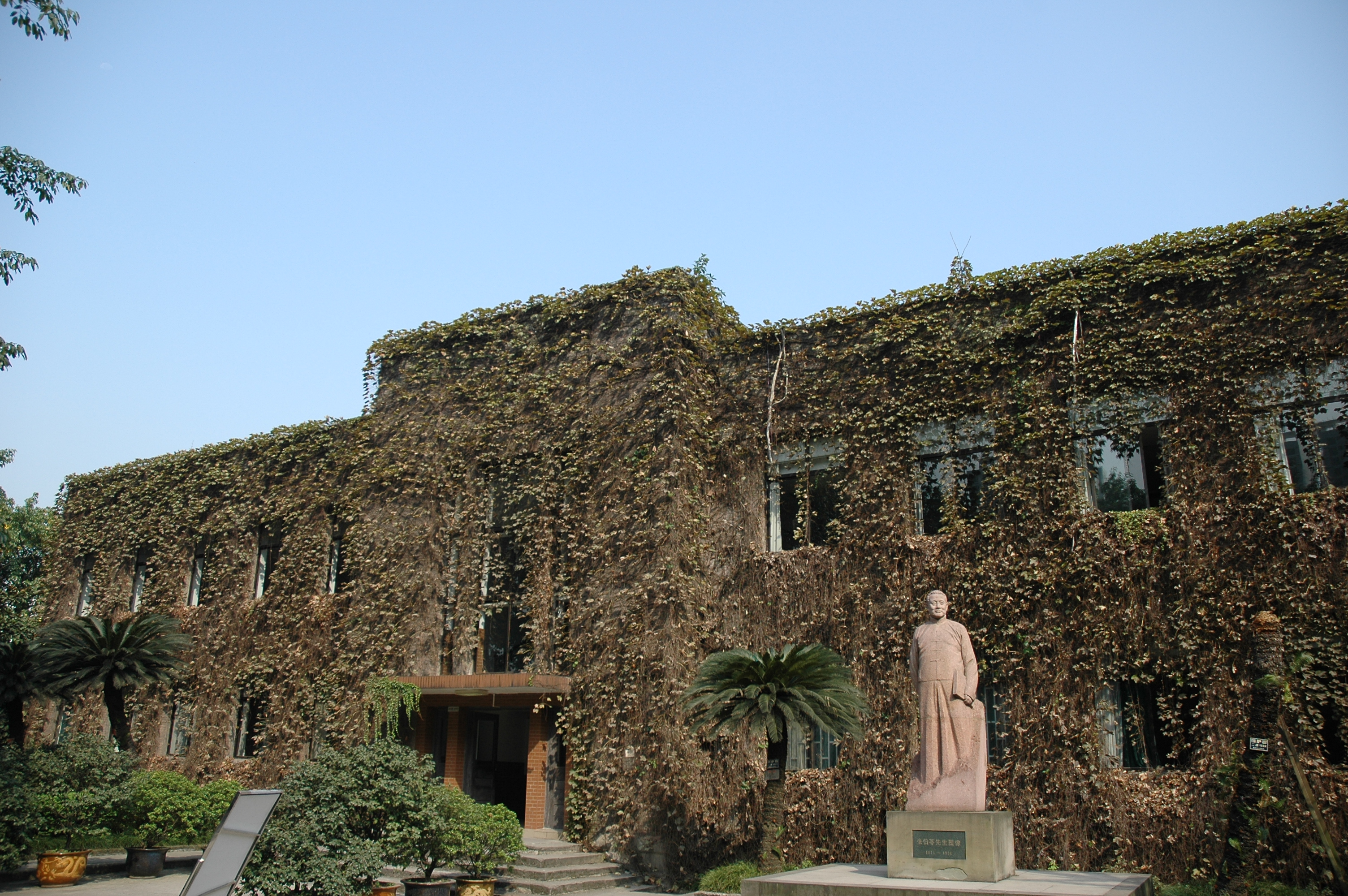
Some institutions, including the Nankai University Institute of Economics, relocated to the campus of Chongqing Nankai Middle School

On October 4, 1939, after the colleges of the National Southwestern Associated University moved to new campuses, classes resumed. During this period, graduates held degrees from Nankai, Tsinghua, Peking University, and the Associated University. Students who enrolled before the merger retained their original university affiliations, while new students enrolled under the Associated University. That same year, the Nankai University Institute of Economics was re-established in the library of Chongqing Nankai Middle School in Chongqing and set up an office in Kunming.

In 1940, with the Japanese invasion of Vietnam, the National Southwestern Associated University prepared to move to Sichuan, temporarily setting up a branch in Xuyong to accommodate new and preparatory students. The Xuyong branch closed the following summer after the situation stabilized. Between 1941 and 1945, several hundred students from the National Southwestern Associated University joined the war effort as translators, participating in the Chinese Expeditionary Force in Burma, and joining the Indian Expeditionary Force, among others.

During the National Southwestern Associated University period, the faculty and students of the three universities adhered to the motto "Perseverance and Excellence" and carried out teaching and research under extremely difficult conditions. On January 1, 1944, the National Government awarded Zhang Boling, the founder of Nankai University, the First Class Order of the Brilliant Star to commend his lifelong dedication to education.

On November 25, 1945, the student unions of the National Southwestern Associated University, Yunnan University, and two other schools organized a current affairs meeting on the university lawn with over 6,000 attendees to protest the civil war. Professors such as Qian Duansheng gave speeches. Soldiers of the Fifth Army of the Nationalist Government fired warning shots from outside the walls and disrupted the meeting by cutting off the electricity, prompting students in Kunming to form the Kunming Union of Secondary and Higher School Strike Committees (referred to as the Strike Union), calling for an end to the civil war and the formation of a coalition government. On December 1, led by the KMT party affairs director Li Zonghuang, Yunnan garrison commander Guan Linzheng, and the 55th Army commander Qiu Qingquan, over a hundred soldiers of the Second Officer Regiment of the Ministry of Military Affairs attacked the campuses of the Associated University, Yunnan University, and other schools, killing four and severely injuring 25 in what became known as the December 1st Incident. Following this, the Strike Union organized larger protests, including strikes by students, faculty, and workers.

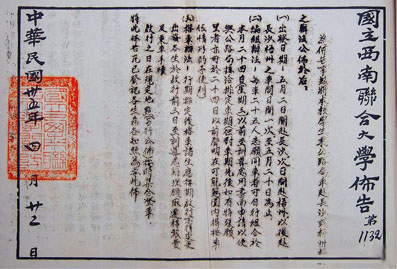
A notice regarding the reopening of the three universities of National Southwestern Associated University

== Reestablishment in Tianjin (1946–1948) ==
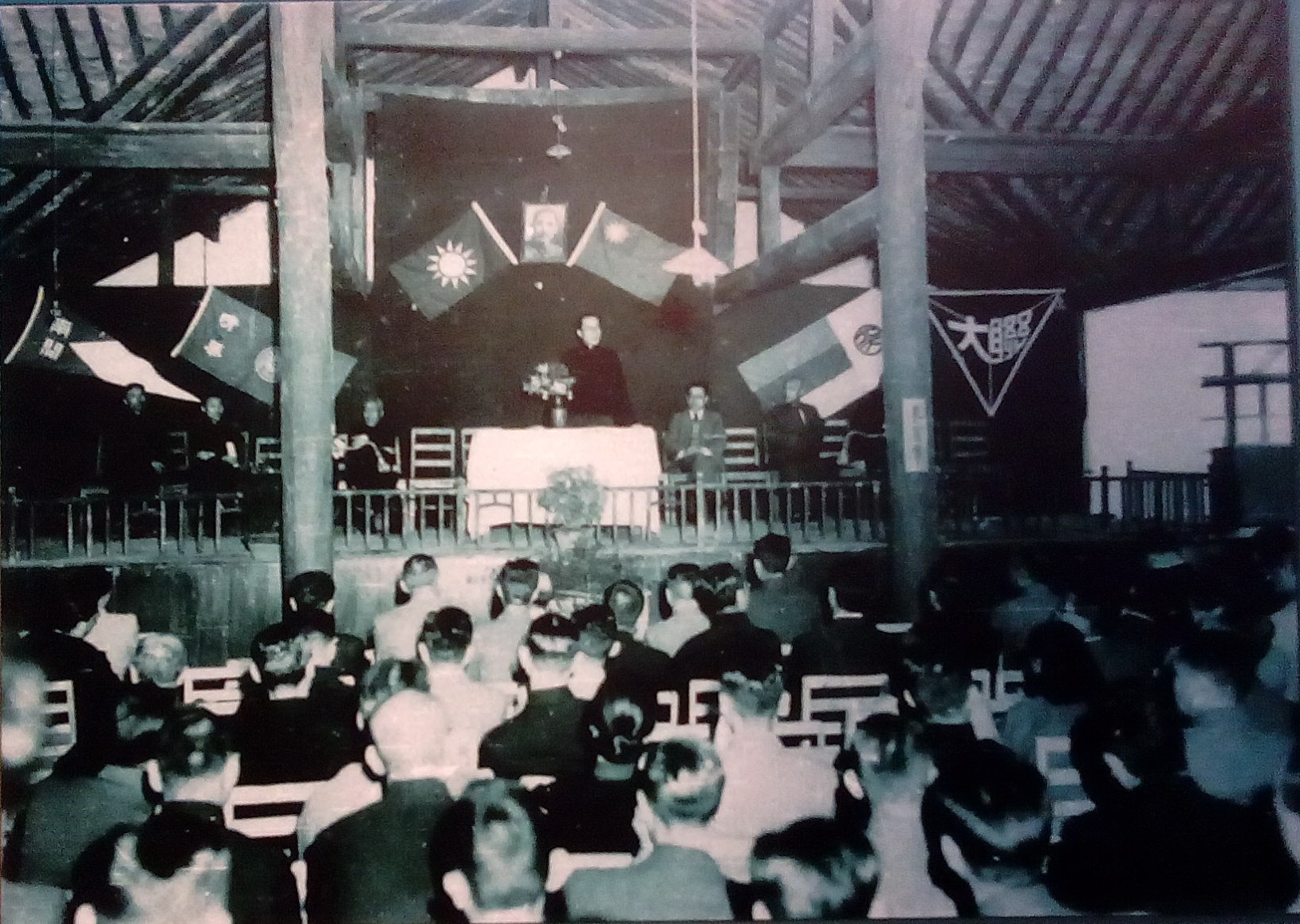
On May 4, 1946, the National Southwestern Associated University held a closing ceremony, officially announcing its end.

Before the Spring Festival in 1942, Zhang Boling visited Chiang Kai-shek to discuss the reestablishment of Nankai University. After the meeting, at the first meeting of the Nankai Rejuvenation Preparatory Committee on February 17 of the same year, Zhang Boling stated that Chiang Kai-shek "still maintained the promise that as long as China exists, Nankai will exist, and assured that our school (Nankai) will be treated on an equal footing with national universities when it is reestablished."

In January 1946, Nankai University established a reestablishment preparatory office on Chongqing Road in Tianjin, reclaiming 853 acres of land at the Balitai campus and 110 acres of land at Liutai, including the Sino-Japanese Middle School, farm, sports field, and nursery. In April, Chiang Kai-shek personally signed the document converting private Nankai University into a national university. On May 4, 1946, the National Southwestern Associated University held its closing ceremony, and on July 31, it announced its dissolution, with the three universities reopening. The National Government allocated 7 billion yuan for travel expenses and 3 billion yuan for construction expenses (1 billion for Peking University, 1.2 billion for Tsinghua, and 800 million for Nankai), converting private Nankai University into National Nankai University. Due to currency depreciation, the Ministry of Education allocated an additional 300 million yuan for Nankai's reestablishment. The campus had been used as a Japanese military camp for eight years, causing severe damage, which posed great difficulties for the reestablishment efforts. While rebuilding teaching and living facilities, Nankai University faculty and students sought to recover looted property from the Japanese. In October, Nankai faculty and students returned to the Balitai campus, recovering 194 boxes of books from Japan. A label was placed on the inside cover of each book stating, "This book was looted by the Japanese invaders in the 26th year of the Republic of China and was recovered from Tokyo after the victory as a commemoration."

On October 17, 1946, Nankai University held a reestablishment ceremony at the Shengli Building in Balitai, announcing the official start of classes, which began on October 20. October 17 was designated as Nankai's anniversary. In December, the Nankai Institute of Economics moved back to Tianjin from Chongqing. After its reestablishment, National Nankai University comprised the College of Liberal Arts, College of Science, College of Political Economy, and College of Engineering, with a total of 16 departments. Additionally, it established the Institute of Economics, the Institute of Applied Chemistry, and the Institute of Frontier Humanities. Scholars such as Wu Daren, Bian Zhilin, Xiao Caiyu, Fu Zhufu, Gao Zhenheng, Li Guangtian, Luo Da'gang, Wang Dexi, Xie Guozhen, and Zhang Qingchang joined Nankai to teach. On January 1, 1947, Nankai University, together with students from Yaohua High School and Nankai High School, held a protest against American military atrocities, joined by students from Peiyang University. They marched to the Tianjin Municipal Government, forcing the mayor Du Jianshi to agree to the students' demands. On January 4, students from Nankai and Peiyang Universities jointly issued a strike declaration, launching a campaign for the withdrawal of American troops from China. In 1948, President Zhang Boling stepped down and was succeeded by He Lian as acting president. In the winter of 1948, the Nankai University Student Union, Professors' Association, Lecturers' Association, and Workers' Union jointly formed the "Nankai University Security Committee" with the university's administrative leaders Yang Shixian, Huang Yusheng, and others to protect Nankai University from damage during the civil war between the Nationalists and Communists.

== From 1949 to Before the Cultural Revolution (1949–1965) ==
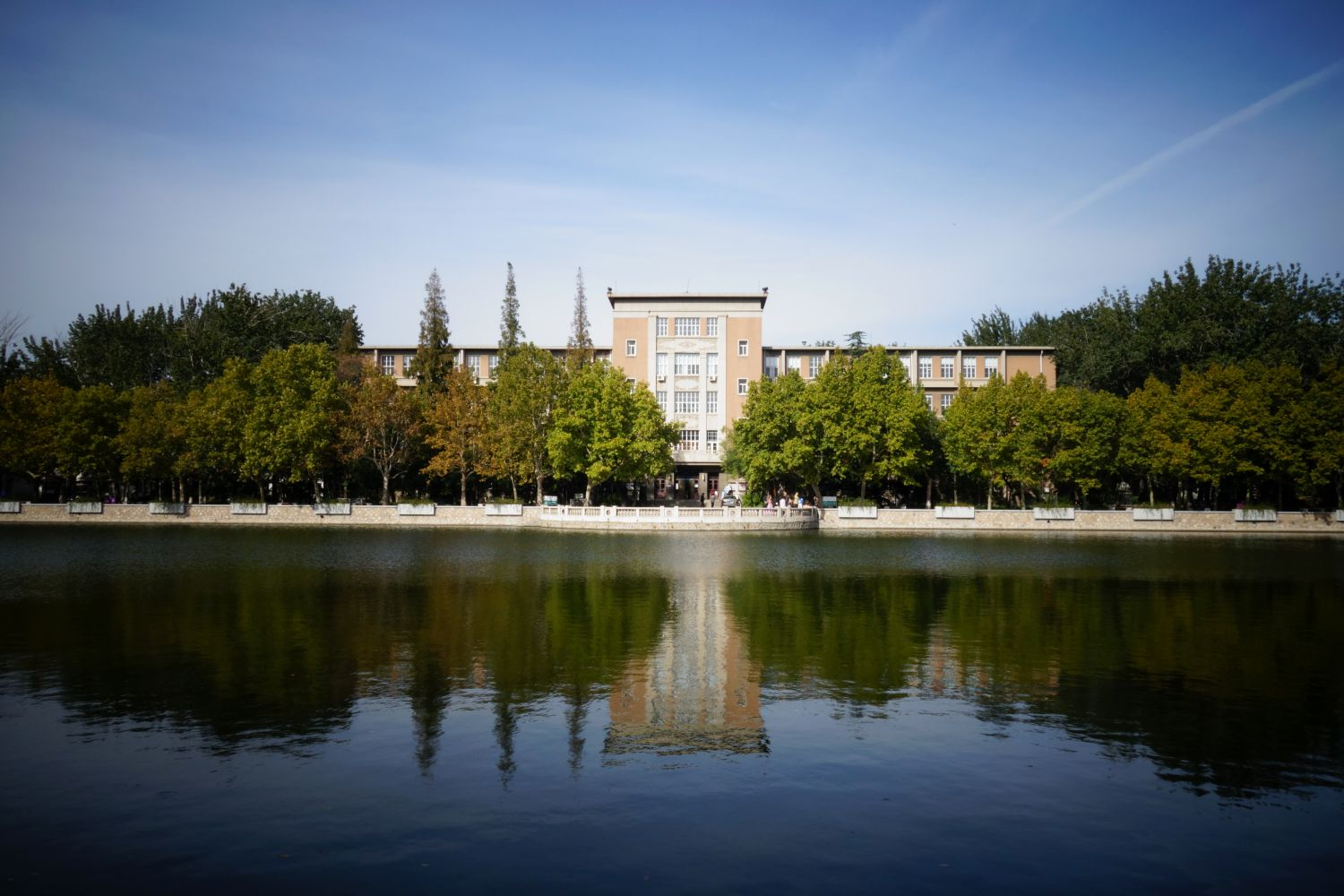
Nankai University Library

In January 1949, the Chinese People's Liberation Army occupied Tianjin. In March, the Hebei Provincial College of Law and Business was dissolved, and most of its students transferred to the relevant departments at Nankai University. On June 27, the "Decision on the Adjustment of Departments and Faculties of Nankai, Peking University, Tsinghua, Beiyang, and Normal University" was announced by the North China Higher Education Committee, which decided to abolish the Philosophy and Education Departments of Nankai University, the Education Department of Peking University, and the Law and Anthropology Departments of Tsinghua University. By the end of 1949, the Education Department of Nankai University had merged into Beijing Normal University.

In 1951, Nankai University rebuilt the library on the original site of the Muzhai Library with donations from the descendants of Mr. Lu Muzhai, in accordance with his wishes. In the spring of 1952, during the Three-Antis and Five-Antis Campaigns, Nankai University initially remained relatively calm. A deputy professor from the Department of Chemical Engineering confessed to taking medicines home and was willing to compensate, which triggered the climax of the Three-Antis and Five-Antis Campaigns at Nankai University, leading to the wrongful accusation of Nankai University Secretary-General Huang Yusheng. In May 1952, to clean up the aftermath, the Ministry of Education officially appointed Yang Shixian as the president, and the Tianjin Military Control Commission appointed Wang Jinding as the Party Secretary of the university. During the 1952 Tianjin Higher Education Institutions Reorganization, the College of Engineering of Nankai University was merged into Tianjin University, the Mathematics and Physics Departments of Tianjin University were merged into Nankai University, and the Trade, Accounting, and Business Administration Departments of Jingu University's Business School were transferred to Nankai University. Nankai University transitioned from a comprehensive university covering liberal arts, science, political economy, and engineering to a Soviet-style comprehensive university focusing solely on liberal arts and science, with 14 departments and 3 specialized programs. In 1957, Yang Shixian became the president of Nankai University. On October 3, 1958, over twenty teachers and students from the Department of Physics at Nankai University independently built China's first experimental atomic reactor in a university—“Nankai No. 1”. In the same year, the trade, business management, accounting, finance, fiscal, and statistics departments of Nankai University were transferred out to form the independent Hebei University of Finance and Economics. The original Institute of Economics was transferred out to form the Institute of Economics of the Hebei Branch of the Chinese Academy of Sciences, but it remained located on the Nankai University campus.

In 1960, Nankai University added the Department of Geology and Geography, the Second Department of Physics, and the Department of Philosophy. In 1961, the Department of Geology and Geography was closed. In 1962, the Institute of Economics of the Hebei Branch of the Chinese Academy of Sciences, which was formed by the split of the Nankai University Institute of Economics, was preparing to close. Zhou Enlai instructed Nankai University to take over and restore the Nankai University Institute of Economics. In the same year, Yang Shixian founded the Institute of Elemento-Organic Chemistry at Nankai University, laying the foundation for Nankai University's chemistry discipline. In 1965, the teachers and students of the nuclear physics and radiochemistry majors from the Second Department of Physics at Nankai University were relocated and merged into Lanzhou University.

== The Cultural Revolution Period (1966–1976) ==
During the Cultural Revolution from 1966 to 1976, the normal teaching order at Nankai University was severely disrupted, and most teachers were subjected to persecution. As soon as the Cultural Revolution began in 1966, the then Hebei Provincial Committee Secretary for Education and Culture, Zhang Chengxian, came to Nankai University to incite unrest. The then Party Secretary of Nankai University, Zang Boping, immediately established the Cultural Revolution Office led by Pang Songpang and the big-character poster organization led by Liu Shikai. At the same time, Zang Boping instructed the Party's Publicity Department, led by Xing Fude, to create a blacklist. Vice President He Xilin and Lou Ping were at the forefront, and over 100 faculty and staff members of Nankai University, including Wu Daren, Teng Weizao, and Zheng Tianting, were labeled as "black gangsters" and were referred to as the "He-Lou Black Gang". This led to their being falsely accused, kidnapped, and subjected to inhumane treatment such as beatings.

On April 27, 1967, a massive armed clash involving tens of thousands of students occurred at Nankai University, with participants coming from Tianjin University, Hebei Institute of Technology, and other universities. On August 20 and 21, 1968, a 3,600-strong worker Mao Zedong Thought Propaganda Team entered Nankai University and took over the leadership of the university. In November, the then leadership of Nankai University, fervent in the Cultural Revolution, issued a notice claiming that Nankai University was infested with traitors, spies, and counter-revolutionaries. Zhou Enlai, upon learning this, expressed his displeasure and rebutted, “I know Nankai University well. How could there be so many traitors, spies, and counter-revolutionaries at Nankai University?” In 1969, 298 people at Nankai University were subjected to struggle sessions, accounting for 7.2% of the total staff, with a total of 538 people, including 510 teaching staff, being illegally investigated. Of these, 160 were forced to attend study sessions, among whom 93% were professors and associate professors.

On April 18, 1970, slogans opposing the Cultural Revolution appeared at Nankai University, marking the "April 18 Incident". In the same year, the Tianjin Revolutionary Committee decided to close the Tianjin Semi-Work-and-Study Institute of Engineering, and its staff was merged into Nankai University. On July 28, 1976, the Tangshan Earthquake affected Tianjin, resulting in the death of 8 faculty and 23 students from Nankai University. Additionally, 2,177 rooms were damaged, covering an area of 77,548 square meters. Precious and delicate instruments worth 43 items and valued at 566,000 yuan were damaged, with direct economic losses exceeding 5 million yuan.

After the Cultural Revolution ended, statistics from the university indicated that out of more than 3,000 faculty and students, 583 were subjected to illegal investigations, 437 were involved in 158 cases of group-based wrongful accusations, 246 faced various degrees of persecution, and 21 were persecuted to death, including former Party Secretary Gao Yangyun and chemist Chen Tianchi. During the Cultural Revolution, several Red Guard organizations, such as the Nankai University "818" Red Rebel Group, were established on campus. The History Department also hosted rare live exhibitions during the Cultural Revolution, where victims were forced to confess their alleged crimes to the audience.

== Post-Reform Era (1976–) ==
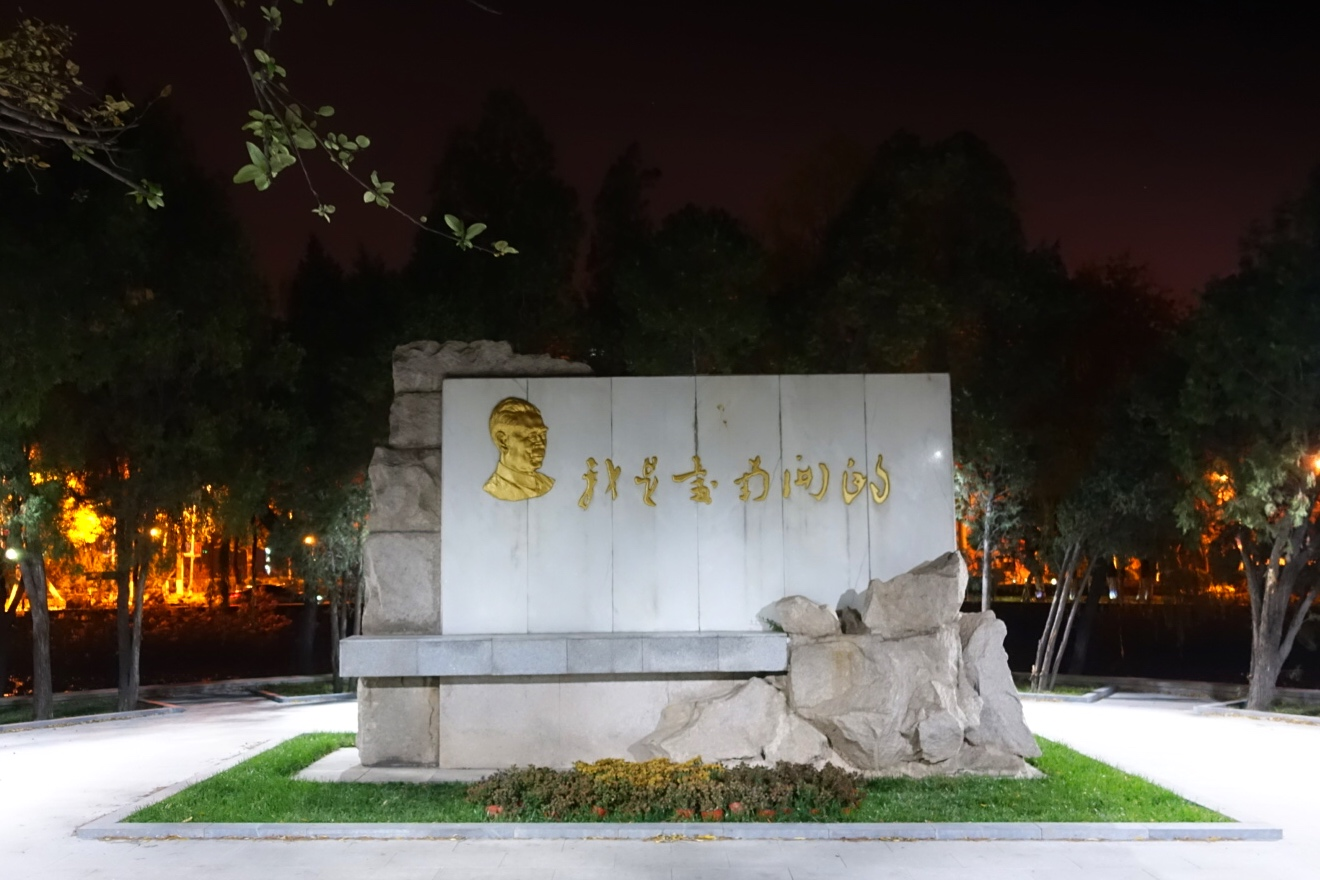
In October 1979, during the 60th anniversary of the university, a Zhou Enlai Memorial Monument was erected on the central island of Mati Lake.

In 1976, with the end of the Cultural Revolution, the teaching order at Nankai University began to gradually recover. On February 17, 1978, the State Council forwarded the Ministry of Education's "Report on the Restoration and Improvement of Key National Higher Education Institutions," designating Nankai University as one of the first batch of key national higher education institutions. In 1979, Yang Shixian resumed his role as president of Nankai University. The Sinologist Ye Jiaying, who was residing in Canada, came to teach at the Department of Chinese at Nankai University for three months.

In October, on the occasion of the 60th anniversary of the university, Nankai University erected the Zhou Enlai Memorial Monument on the central island of Mati Lake. In December, the textbook "Political Economy (Socialist Section)," edited by Professor Gu Shutang of Nankai University, was officially published. It became a widely used economics textbook in northern China's universities and was referred to as the "Northern Version". This book broke away from the framework of Soviet textbooks, incorporated the latest research findings, and went through multiple revisions, having a significant influence in the field of economics education in China.

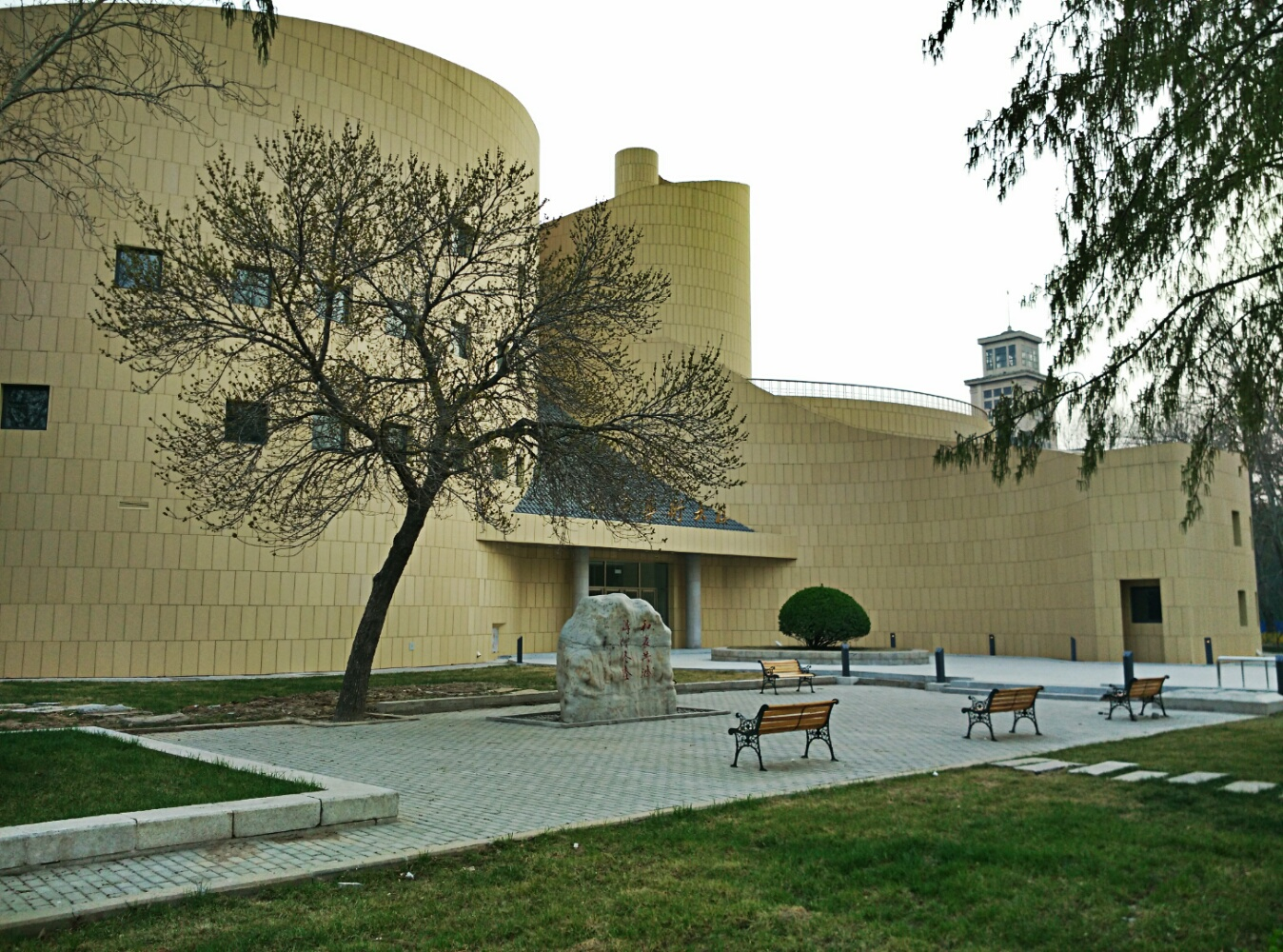
In 1984, the Fan Zeng-donated Oriental Art Building

In 1980, President Yang Shixian proposed to resign, which was extremely rare in the higher education sector at that time. The following year, the central government accepted his resignation and appointed him as Honorary President of Nankai University. Teng Weizao succeeded him as president. During his tenure, Nankai University leveraged its strong foundation in traditional core disciplines to establish a number of new academic programs, including Museology, Law, Tourism Foreign Languages, Tourism Economic Management, Finance, Insurance, Auditing, International Economics, Political Science, Sociology, and Editorial Studies. This development created a comprehensive system of humanities education and led to the re-establishment of the College of Economics in 1983.

Additionally, a series of interdisciplinary, emerging, and high-tech programs were established, such as Applied Chemistry, Electronics, Computer Applications, Biomedicine, and Bioengineering. On September 8, 1984, Nankai University formally established its Graduate School. In the same year, Fang Zeng donated 30 million yuan to build the Oriental Art Building on the university campus, which became a landmark on the campus.

In 1985, the National Key Laboratory of Elemental Organic Chemistry was established based on the Elemental Organic Chemistry Research Institute and the Metal-Organic Chemistry Research Group in the Department of Chemistry, becoming one of the first National Key Laboratories in China. In June 1986, following the joint proposal of Shiing-Shen Chern and Yang Zhenning, Nankai University began planning for the Theoretical Physics Research Room in the Mathematics Research Institute. In 1987, the World Economic Research Room of the Nankai University Economic Research Institute was separately established as the Nankai University International Economic Research Institute.

By the mid-to-late 1980s, Nankai University had developed into a comprehensive university encompassing a wide range of disciplines, including humanities and social sciences, natural sciences, engineering sciences, life sciences, management sciences, and the arts.

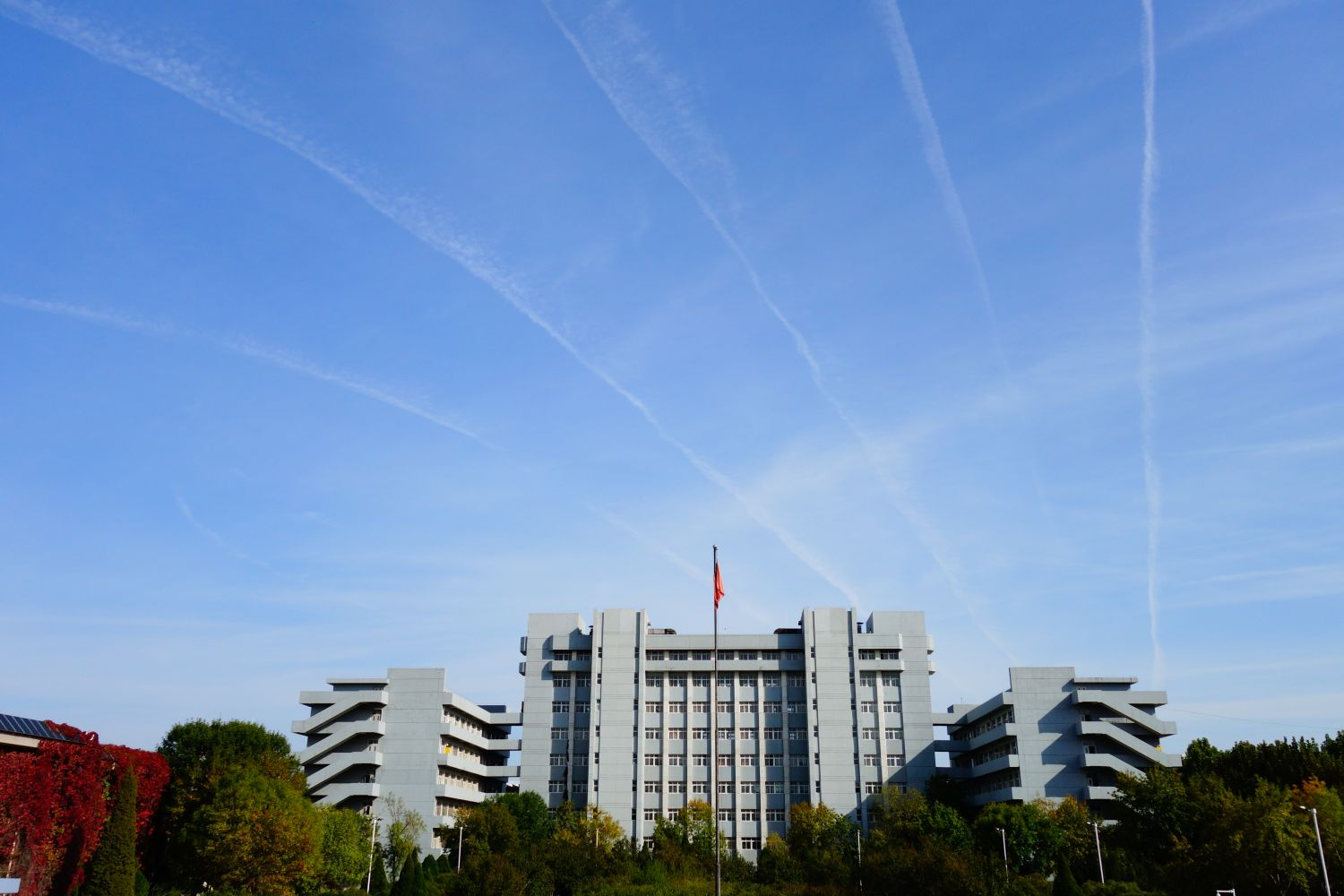
Nankai University College of Chemistry

On August 29, 1990, the Citric Acid Factory, which was under the Tianjin City First Light Industry Bureau, was fully transferred to the Nankai University New Technology Industry Group Company, making it the first industrial enterprise in Tianjin to be allocated to a higher education institution. In 1991, Ye Jiaying was invited to establish the Nankai University Research Institute of Chinese Classical Culture at Nankai University and served as its director.

In 1994, the Tianjin Foreign Trade College, a subordinate institution of the Ministry of Foreign Economic and Trade, merged with Nankai University and contributed to the formation of the Nankai University Business School. In 1995, Nankai University was selected as one of the first batch of institutions in China's 211 Project. In the same year, Hou Zixin succeeded Guo Guang as the President of Nankai University.

In July 1997, on the 60th anniversary of the destruction of Nankai Garden by the Japanese army, Nankai University recast its school bell and hung it beside Dazhong Road. In May 1998, Nankai University signed an agreement with the Tianjin Economic-Technological Development Area to invest 320 million yuan in the construction of the Nankai University TEDA College.

In the late 1990s, amid the wave of university mergers in China, then Vice Premier Li Lanqing hoped that Nankai University and Tianjin University would merge based on the principles of "joint construction, adjustment, cooperation, and merger." The Ministry of Education and Tianjin city leaders pressured both universities with the promise of an additional spot in the "985 Project" among other conditions. However, both universities, with their long histories and unique educational characteristics, faced strong opposition from alumni, and the merger plan ultimately failed. The strategy was adjusted to "independent operation with close cooperation," and a wall was erected along Tian Nan Street, which connected the two universities.

At the same time, the two universities cooperated to establish the Nankai University-Tianjin University Liu Hui Applied Mathematics Center and chose a site at the junction of their campuses to build the Nankai University-Tianjin University Joint Research Building as a compromise following the rejection of the merger proposal.

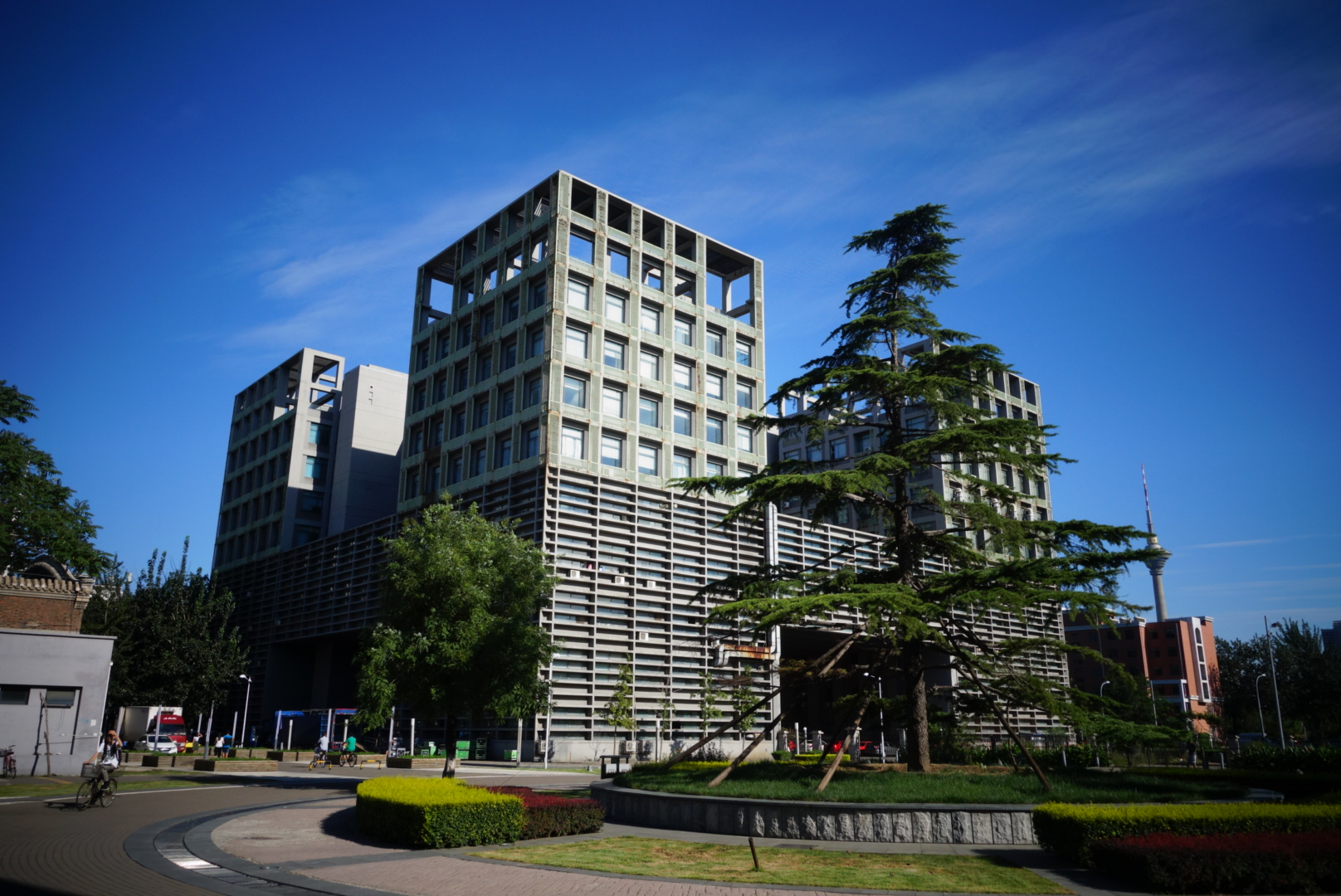
Nankai University-Tianjin University Joint Research Building

In January 2000, mathematician Shiing-Shen Chern settled in the villa Ning Yuan, which was built on the Nankai University campus for him by the university. In August, the Nankai University TEDA College was officially established. On December 25 of the same year, Nankai University was selected as part of the "985 Project". In 2002, Nankai University Shenzhen Financial Engineering Institute was founded, with Nobel Laureate in Economic Sciences Robert Mundell and the first chairman of the China Securities Regulatory Commission Liu Hongru serving as honorary deans.

On June 2, 2004, the Nankai University Education Foundation was established. On November 17, Nankai University signed an agreement with the University of Maryland to establish North America's first Confucius Institute — the Confucius Institute at the University of Maryland.

In 2005, it was discovered that 400 million yuan from the Yungong Group, a subsidiary of Nankai University, had been misused. In May 2006, the embezzlement case involving the Yungong Group was exposed. Rao Zihe succeeded Hou Zixin as President of Nankai University. In October 2006, the Nankai University Sports Center was completed and put into use. On December 24, 2007, a Buick sedan at the Nankai University Student Activity Center collided with a student on a bicycle and demanded an apology from the student, leading to a conflict known as the "Buick Incident".

In 2009, the cooperation between the university and the Shenzhen municipal government fell through due to conflicting ideas and interests, resulting in the dissolution of the Nankai University Shenzhen Financial Engineering Institute and the transfer of its location to Southern University of Science and Technology as a start-up campus. In the same year, Nankai University renovated the student dormitory designed by Liang Sicheng, changing its function to the Liberal Arts Innovation Building.

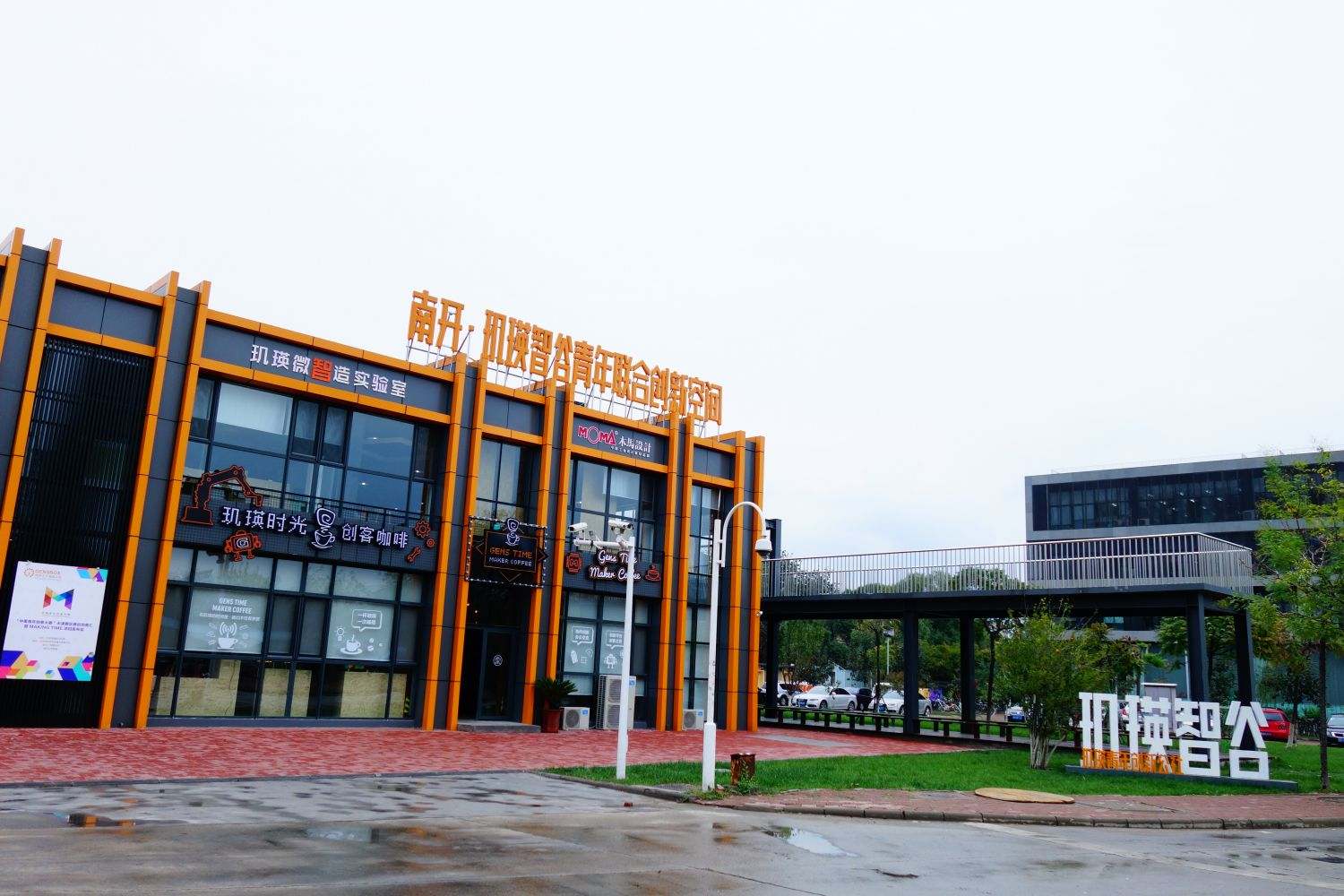
Hackerspace in Nankai University

In 2010, the National Tourism Administration and Nankai University signed a strategic cooperation agreement, transferring the China Tourism Management Cadre College under the National Tourism Administration to Nankai University, which merged it with the Tourism Department to form the Nankai University School of Tourism and Service. The plan for a new campus in Jinghai County was changed to the Haihe Education Park due to the proposal of then-Tianjin Municipal Party Secretary Zhang Gaoli. In January 2011, President Rao Zihe, known for his bold and pioneering spirit, was suddenly reassigned from Nankai University, leading to much speculation. Gong Ke took over as President of Nankai University.

In 2013, the Nankai University School of Chemistry participated in the establishment of the Tianjin Chemical Engineering Collaborative Innovation Center, and also led the cultivation of collaborative innovation centers such as the Mathematics and Science Frontier Collaborative Innovation Center. On July 15, 2014, the 22nd Ministry Meeting of the Ministry of Education reviewed and approved the "Nankai University Charter". In the same year, the Nankai University Jinnan Research Institute was officially inaugurated. The same year, the Nankai University Jiying Youth Innovation and Entrepreneurship Practice Base was established as a maker space jointly created by Nankai University and the Nankai District of Tianjin.

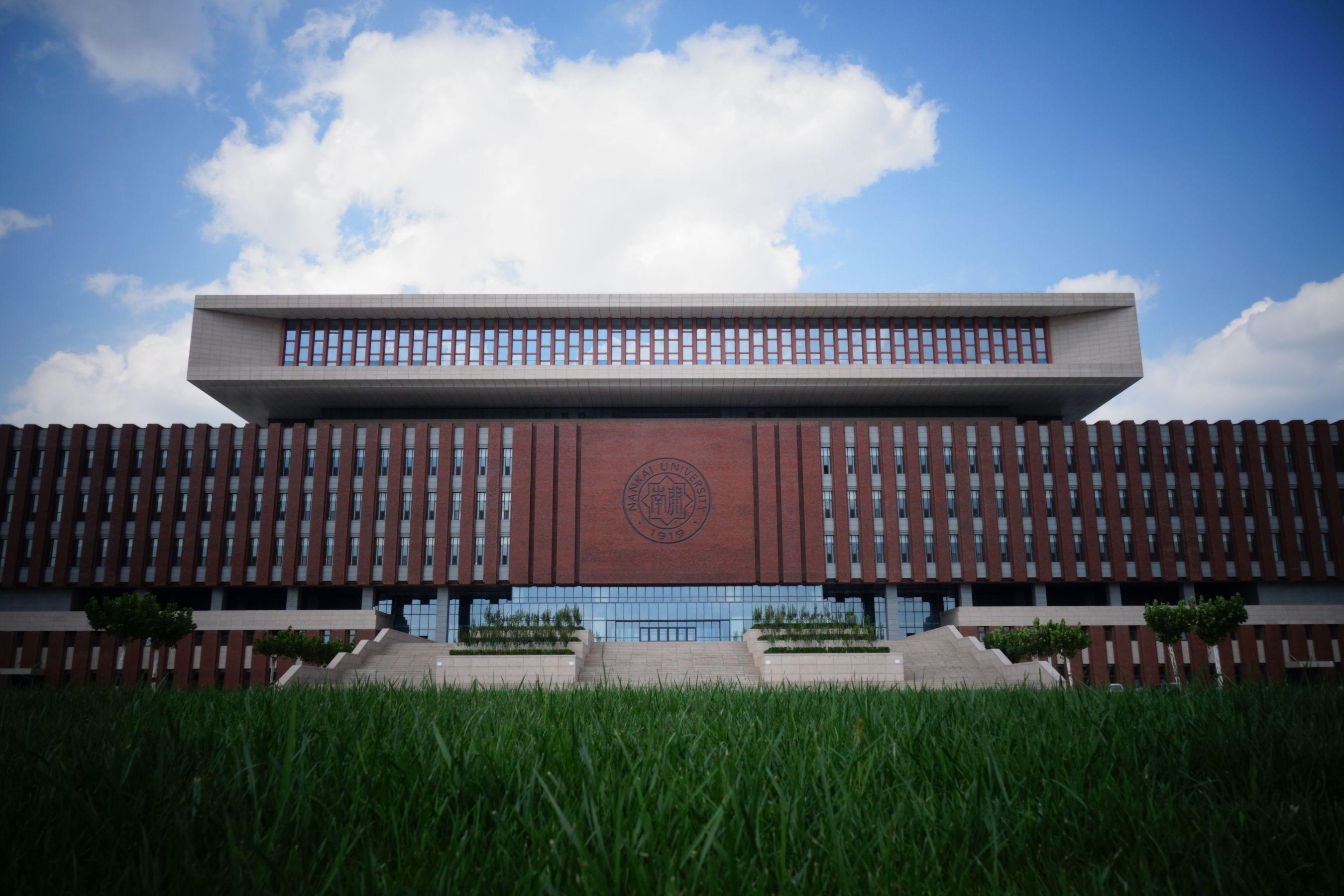
Library of Nankai University Jinnan Campus

In March 2015, Nankai University participated in the establishment of the China-ASEAN Regional Development Collaborative Innovation Center. In June, the university's School of Finance and School of Materials Science and Engineering were officially established. On September 5, the Nankai University Jinnan Campus was officially inaugurated.

In September 2016, Xue Jinwen, who had served as the Party Secretary of Nankai University for 14 years, was replaced by Wei Dapeng. In October, Nankai University fully integrated Tianjin Fourth Hospital as its affiliated hospital. In November 2016, demolition of the Nankai University Ying Shui Dao Campus began.

On September 21, 2017, the Ministry of Education, the Ministry of Finance, and the National Development and Reform Commission released the list of "Double First-Class" universities and disciplines. Nankai University was included as a "world-class university" and several disciplines including World History, Mathematics, Chemistry, Statistics, and Materials Science and Engineering were listed as "world-class disciplines". In October 2017, Nankai University signed strategic cooperation agreements with 12 tertiary hospitals including Tianjin First Central Hospital, Tianjin Third Central Hospital, Tianjin Fourth Central Hospital, Tianjin Eye Hospital, Tianjin Stomatological Hospital, Tianjin People's Hospital, Tianjin Chest Hospital, Tianjin Huankou Hospital, Tianjin Nankai Hospital, Tianjin Second People's Hospital, Tianjin Central Obstetrics and Gynecology Hospital, and the 254th Hospital of the PLA. These hospitals would undertake clinical teaching tasks for the Nankai University Medical School.

On January 3, 2018, Cao Xuetao, an academician of the Chinese Academy of Engineering and immunologist, succeeded Gong Ke as the tenth president of Nankai University.

In September 2019, President Cao Xuetao launched the "4211 Excellence Nankai Action Plan", which included four major plans: "Liberal Arts Revival", "Science Enhancement", "Engineering Ascent", and "Biomedical Development". The plan aimed to establish two major reward systems for educational teaching and scientific research, create ten interdisciplinary science centers on campus, and collaborate with world-class universities to build ten international joint research centers.

In October 2020, Nankai University signed a strategic cooperation framework agreement with Tianjin Medical University, with Tianjin Medical University President Yan Hua also serving as the Dean of the Nankai University Medical School.

== History Research and Publications ==
The history of Nankai University is a subject of study in Chinese modern history, education history, and the history of the Anti-Japanese War. Scholars such as Jiang Pei have studied the relationship between Chiang Kai-shek, Zhang Boling, and Nankai University, noting that post-1949 political evaluations have led to Chiang Kai-shek being overlooked or intentionally downplayed in the university's historical records. However, the continued funding and support Nankai University received during turbulent times, including its inclusion in the Southwest Associated University, were closely linked to the interactions and political factors involving Chiang Kai-shek and Zhang Boling. Scholars such as Jin Guo and Hu Jinping have researched the "government-university relationship" in the process of Nankai University's transition from a private to a national institution. They argue that the process was essentially a way for the National Government to gradually control and undermine the autonomy of private universities through the distribution of educational resources.

Nankai University has established a history research office to study topics related to Nankai University, Nankai School, Zhang Boling, and other historical issues. The history research office has led or participated in the publication of works such as "Nankai Scholars' Autobiography," "Nankai University in the War of Resistance Against Japanese Aggression," and "Historical Atlas of Nankai University in the War of Resistance Against Japanese Aggression."

In 2004, to mark the centennial of Nankai School, the "Centennial Nankai" exhibition, designed by Nankai University's history research office, was held at the National Museum of China in Beijing. In 2017, alumni from the 1986 Electronic Engineering Department of Nankai University initiated the production of the documentary "Nankai Century Legend". On December 18, 2017, the joint documentary "There is a School Called Nankai," produced by CCTV and Tianjin Television, premiered, documenting the centennial history of Nankai University and other Nankai series schools.

Currently, Nankai University is in the process of constructing a history museum at the Tianjin campus to exhibit artifacts and historical materials since the university's founding.
