= Northeast Research Association of Nankai University =

The Northeast Research Association of Nankai University, formerly known as the Manchu Mongolian Research Association of Nankai University, was established on November 14, 1927, with the support of Nankai University President Chang Po-ling. It aimed to "specialize in collecting materials on the Manchuria–Mongolia problem and using scientific methods to solve problems in China". When the research association was established, Fu Enling, who had studied abroad in Japan and was then a Japanese language teacher at Nankai University, was hired as the director. In October 1928, the research association was renamed the Northeast Research Association of Nankai University, which was hailed as a banner for the study of the Manchuria–Mongolia problem.

== History ==
In August 1927, Chang Po-ling, the principal of Nankai School, took a boat from Shanghai to visit the Northeast region after hosting the 8th Far Eastern Championship Games. In Dalian and other places, he witnessed the expansion and business activities of Japanese power with his own eyes, and couldn't help but sigh: "Without going to Northeast China, you don't know the vastness of China; without going to Northeast China, you don't know the dangers of China." Therefore, after returning to Tianjin in October, Chang Po-ling began planning to establish the Nankai University Manchuria Mongolia Research Association and appointed Fu Enling, who teaches Japanese at Nankai University, as its director.

On November 14, 1927, the Manchu Mongolian Research Association was officially established in the auditorium of Tianjin Nankai High School, with Fu Enling as the director. Its purpose was to "specialize in collecting materials on the Manchuria–Mongolia problem and using scientific methods to solve problems in China." The research association mainly recruited Northeastern students studying at Nankai University and other students concerned about the Manchuria–Mongolia problem. There are inspection and research departments within the organization: the inspection department conducts investigations, lectures, and other methods to understand Japan's national conditions and its aggressive movements in Northeast China; the research department is responsible for collecting and organizing data and conducting research in accordance with academic groups.

In March 1928, the Manchuria Mongolia Research Association held the "Northeast Research Materials Exhibition" on the campus of Nankai University, showcasing books and catalogs in Chinese, Japanese, English, and Russian, as well as specimens and films of products from the Northeast. In October of the same year, the Manchu Mongolian Research Association was renamed the Northeast Research Association of Nankai University, becoming a banner for the study of Manchuria–Mongolia problem.

== Publication ==
In 1931, based on long-term field research and research at the Northeast Research Association, Fu Enling edited the "Nankai Middle School Northeast Geography Textbook" as a compulsory course for Tianjin Nankai High School. The academic community believes the Northeast Geography Textbook to be one of the reasons for the bombing of Nankai University and Tianjin Nankai High School by the Japanese army in 1937, as it reveals Japan's intentions to invade China. In June 1933, the Institute of Nankai Institute of Economics collected two volumes of "Northeast Geography Textbook". In 1934, the Northeast Research Association compiled "Northeast Economic Geography".

In 1936, on the eve of the outbreak of the War of Resistance Against Japan, President Chang Po-ling, out of concern for the invasion of the Japanese army, packed 127 boxes of 21000 volumes of books and research materials accumulated by the Nankai Economic Research Institute over the past decade and shipped them south to prevent the destruction of important materials at Nankai University. The data was transferred via Hong Kong, Coastal defence and fortification , and other locations over several years, finally arriving in Chongqing in 1940. The only surviving "Northeast Geography Textbook" is currently being migrated southward along with the materials. After Nankai University resumed operations in 1945, these books were returned to the Nankai Institute of Economics.

In 2015, with the opening of the Jinnan Campus of Nankai University, some books and materials were relocated from the old library of the Balitai Campus to the new library of the Jinnan Campus. The first and second volumes of "Northeast Geography Textbook" were rediscovered and republished.

== Related Item ==
- Nankai Institute of Economics
