= The Reminiscences of Tsiang T'ing-fu =

Book by Tsiang Tingfu

- Author: Tsiang Tingfu
- Language: English
- Publisher: East Asian Institute of Columbia University
- Publication date: 1974
- OCLC: 2272966

The Reminiscences of Tsiang T'ing-fu (Chinese: 蔣廷黻回憶錄; pinyin: Jiǎngtíngfú huíyìlù) is an English memoir written by Tsiang Tingfu. It contains chapters on Tsiang's family background, studying in the United States, teaching in Nankai University and Tsinghua University, visiting Moscow, and others. Due to the death of Tsiang on 9 October 1965, the oral autobiography was an unfinished project and was not completed until 1974 when it was embellished and revised by Anita O'Brien.

The book was originally part of the Chinese Oral History Project, East Asian Institute of Columbia University, hosted by Franklin Ho and C. Martin Wilbur, and done with Crystal Lorch Seidman.

The Reminiscences of Tsiang T'ing-fu was first published in 1974 by East Asian Institute of Columbia University in New York. The Chinese translation of the book was first published in 1979 by Biographical Literature Press in Taipei.

== Published in Mainland China ==
In 2003, The Reminiscences of Tsiang T'ing-fu was first published in Mainland China in simplified Chinese by Yuelu Publishing House, but with abridgements.
