= Li Guangtian =

Chinese essayist

- Traditional Chinese: 李廣田
- Simplified Chinese: 李广田
Transcriptions
Standard Mandarin
- Hanyu Pinyin: Lǐ Guǎngtián

Li Guangtian (1906–1968, born Wang Xijue) was a 20th-century Chinese essayist.

== Biography ==
Born into an indigent peasant family with the surname Wang, he was adopted by his uncle, and changed his surname into Li. In 1923, he entered the First Normal School of Shandong, and was arrested later because of recommending left-wing literature. In 1929, Li sat entrance examinations for and was accepted at the foreign language department of Beijing University. In 1936, The poetry anthology The Han Garden Collection (《汉园集》) co-written by Li, Bian Zhilin and He Qifang was published. He published three prose collections before the Second Sino-Japanese War: the Gallery Collection (《画廊集》, 1936), the Silver Fox Collection (《银狐集》, 1936), and the Quesuo Collection (《雀蓑集》, 1939). After the outbreak of the war, he went into exile at southwest China. He wrote several essay collections during this time, including Outside the Circle (《圈外》, 1942), the Echoes (《回声》, 1943) and the Essays under the Sun (《日边随笔》, 1948). After 1949, he contributed himself into educational cause. He also did some research about the literature of the minority groups of China. He collated the long love poems like Ashima (《阿诗玛》) of the Yi people and Xianxiu (《线秀》) of the Dai people.
