= Huang Yusheng =

Chinese educator and library scientist

- Born: April 15, 1898; Hubei
- Died: April 11, 1990 (aged 91); Tianjin
- Occupations: educator Library scientist
- Political party: Chinese Communist Party
- Spouse(s): Mei Meide; Ye Yifan

Huang Yusheng (April 15, 1898 – April 11, 1990), courtesy name Zijian, was a Chinese educator and library scientist.

== Early life and education ==
Huang Yusheng was born in 1898 in Mianyang, Hubei (now Xiantao City). In 1911, he went to live with his uncle, Lu Muzhai, in Tianjin. In 1915, he graduated from Tianjin Nankai High School and was admitted to the preparatory program for studying in the United States at Tsinghua University. In 1919, he went to the United States on a government scholarship and entered the University of Chicago, where he earned a master's degree in educational psychology in 1923.

== Career ==
In 1925, he returned to China and worked as a professor of philosophy at Nankai University. In 1927, he became director of the university division, and was appointed secretary-general. After the Marco Polo Bridge Incident, he assisted the principal Zhang Boling in transferring the faculty and equipment of Nankai University to Changsha Temporary University. In 1938, as the war became critical, teachers and students from the three universities were forced to relocate again to Kunming, Yunnan. He was responsible for the most difficult of the three transfer routes, the "Xiang–Qian–Dian Traveling Group", serving as chairman of the Teachers' Guidance Committee. Together with professors such as Wen Yiduo, Yuan Fuli, Li Jitong, Zeng Zhaolun, and Wu Zhengyi, he walked more than three thousand li, enduring a journey of over two months before finally arriving in Kunming. After the establishment of the National Southwestern Associated University, he served as director of campus construction. In the autumn of 1938, the university added a Teachers College, and Huang Yusheng was appointed dean, while also serving concurrently as director of its affiliated middle and primary schools.

After the victory in the Second Sino-Japanese War, he was sent back to Tianjin by Zhang to resume university operations. He served as director of the Tianjin Municipal Education Bureau and as secretary-general of Nankai University.

During the "Three-anti and Five-anti Campaigns" in 1952, he was falsely accused of secretly storing funds. After he was cleared of the charges, he agreed to be transferred out of the education sector and was appointed director of the Tianjin Library. After the downfall of the Gang of Four, he served as vice chairman of the Tianjin Municipal Committee of the Chinese People's Political Consultative Conference (CPPCC). He was a member of the Fifth and Sixth National Committees of the CPPCC. In 1981, he led a delegation to attend the 100th Annual Conference of the American Library Association. In 1986, he joined the Chinese Communist Party.

== Death ==
He died on April 11, 1990, in Tianjin at 91.
