= Bian Zhilin =

Chinese poet, translator and literature researcher

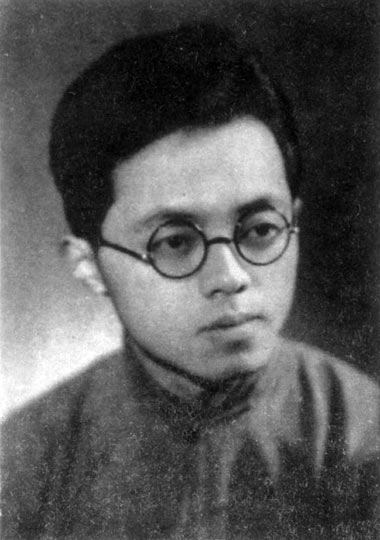
- Born: 8 December 1910; Haimen, Jiangsu, China
- Died: 2 December 2000 (aged 89)
- Occupations: Novelist, poet, translator
- Writing career
- Pen name: 季陵
- Genre: poetry

Bian Zhilin (Chinese: 卞之琳; pinyin: Biàn Zhīlín; Wade–Giles: Pien Chih-lin, 1910–2000) was a 20th-century Chinese poet, translator and literature researcher.

Bian was born in Haimen, Jiangsu on December 8, 1910, and liked to read classical and modern Chinese poems when he was very young. In 1929, he entered the English department of Beijing University to study. During this time he was greatly influenced by the English romantic poems and French symbolic poems, and began to write poems by himself. The poetry anthology The Han Garden Collection (《汉园集》) co-written by Bian, Li Guangtian and He Qifang, was published in 1936.

Bian's poems were related to the Crescent School (新月派) which advocated modern metrical poetry, but his style was closer to the Chinese symbolists. He once coedited the magazine New Poems (《新诗》) with the representative figure of Chinese symbolist poetry Dai Wangshu. Bian's poems of this time represented his dissatisfaction and thinking of the social reality as a young intellectual, showed his quick perception, and sometimes hard to understand. He sought for strangeness of words, tidiness of syllables, and many of his poems were full of a melancholy mood.

During the Second Sino-Japanese War, he taught at Sichuan University and National Southwestern Associated University. From 1938 to 1939 he took a visit to Yan'an and Taihangshan, and once taught at the institute of Lu Xun's art and literature. Bian compiled his A Selection of 10 Years' Poetry (1930–1939) (《十年诗草》) in 1941, and it was published in the next year. In 1946, he went to the Nankai University to teach.

In 1949, Bian became a professor of the foreign language department of Beijing University. From 1964, he served as a researcher of the Institute of Foreign Literature of the Chinese Academy of Social Sciences (中国社会科学院外国文学研究所).
