= Manchuria–Mongolia problem =

Problem in the Russo-Japanese War

The Manchuria-Mongolia problem (Japanese: 満蒙問題, Hepburn: manmō mondai) refers to a set of issues concerning Imperial Japan's protection of its special interests in Manchuria and Inner Mongolia in the aftermath of the Russo-Japanese War.

According to Sakuro Nagao, the interests included the question of concession rights in the Kwantung Leased Territory, rights over neutral territories to the north of the Kwantung Leased Territory, the administration of the South Manchuria Railway Zone, and the granting of exclusive control over railway track construction to the South Manchuria Railway.
