= Nankai Institute of Economics =

Economic research institute in China

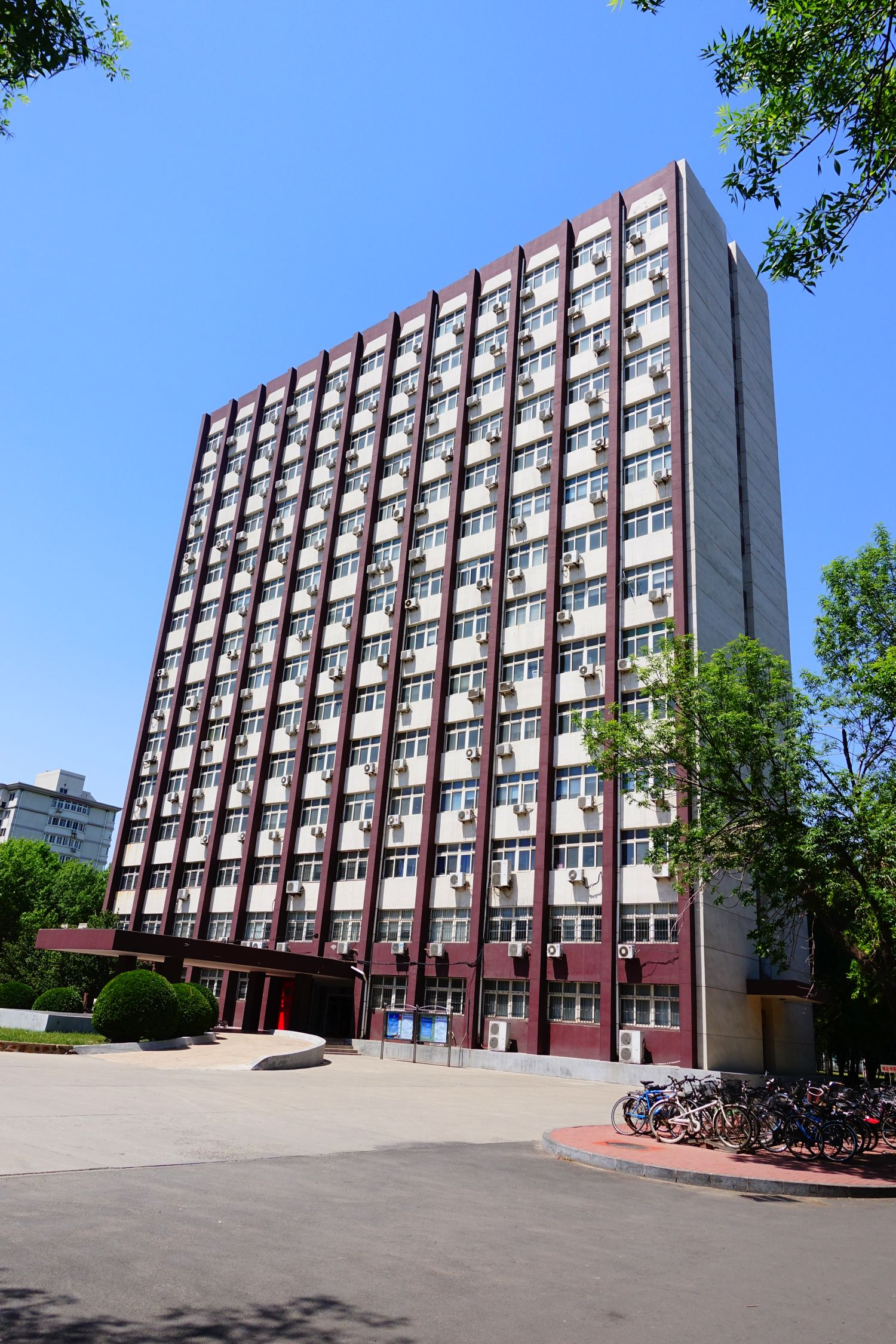
- Other name: 南开大学经济研究所
- Established: September 10 1927; 99 years ago
- Location: Balitai Campus, 19 Weijin Road, Nankai, Tianjin, China
- Website: nkie.nankai.edu.cn

The Nankai Institute of Economics (NKIE) is an economic research institute affiliated to the Nankai University School of Economics. It is located within the university's Balitai campus at Nankai, Tianjin.

The institute was founded in 1927 by He Lian and Zhang Boling, was originally named Nankai Committee of Sociology and Economics. It changed its name into Nankai Institute of Economics in 1931, and then established the tenet of the institute, which is to "know China and serve China". The systematic social research that the institute has conducted was ahead of its time in China. The Nankai Price Index, compiled in 1927, was the very first price index in China and the most important reference to the study of Chinese economy during that time, indicating that it was rather influential and of high academic value. The institute was then regarded as the authority of Chinese economic studies during the period of Republic of China (1912–1949).

== History ==
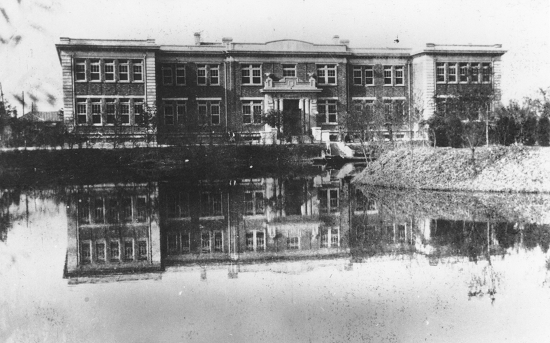
Xiushan Hall, donated by Li Chun, the early office of NKIE

=== Early stage ===
In 1926, He Lian returned to China after receiving his doctor's degree from Yale University, and was offered a position by Zhang Boling, the principal of Nankai University, and Tao Menghe, the head of the social research's department of China Foundation for the Promotion of Education and Culture. Tao Menghe invited He Lian to be the research adviser for the department. Although he declined the offer, He Lian was still interested in the idea and proposed to Zhang Boling that an independent research organization should be established, which was approved by Zhang Boling.

On September 10, 1927, Nankai Committee of Sociology and Economics was founded under the support of Zhang Boling and He Lian, and it was the previous form of Nankai Institute of Economics. Its office was set in Xiushan Hall, Balitai. He Lian took the position of chief adviser of the committee. Because it was considered a specialized research institution, the committee focused its early studies on two aspects, the collection of books, journals and other materials about Chinese economy, written in Chinese and other languages, as well as the compilation of an anthology of Chinese economics which included editing and analyzing the statistics of Chinese economy. In 1928, Fang Xianting, a fellow student of He Lian's, returned to China to support Nankai University after receiving his doctorate of economics from Yale. He was officially employed as the chief researcher of the committee. Influence by Fang Xianting, the committee shifted its focus to the study of "the degree and the impact of China's industrialization" in the Tianjin region, which is China's first systematic research on social economics and earliest empirical research of economics.

=== Development ===
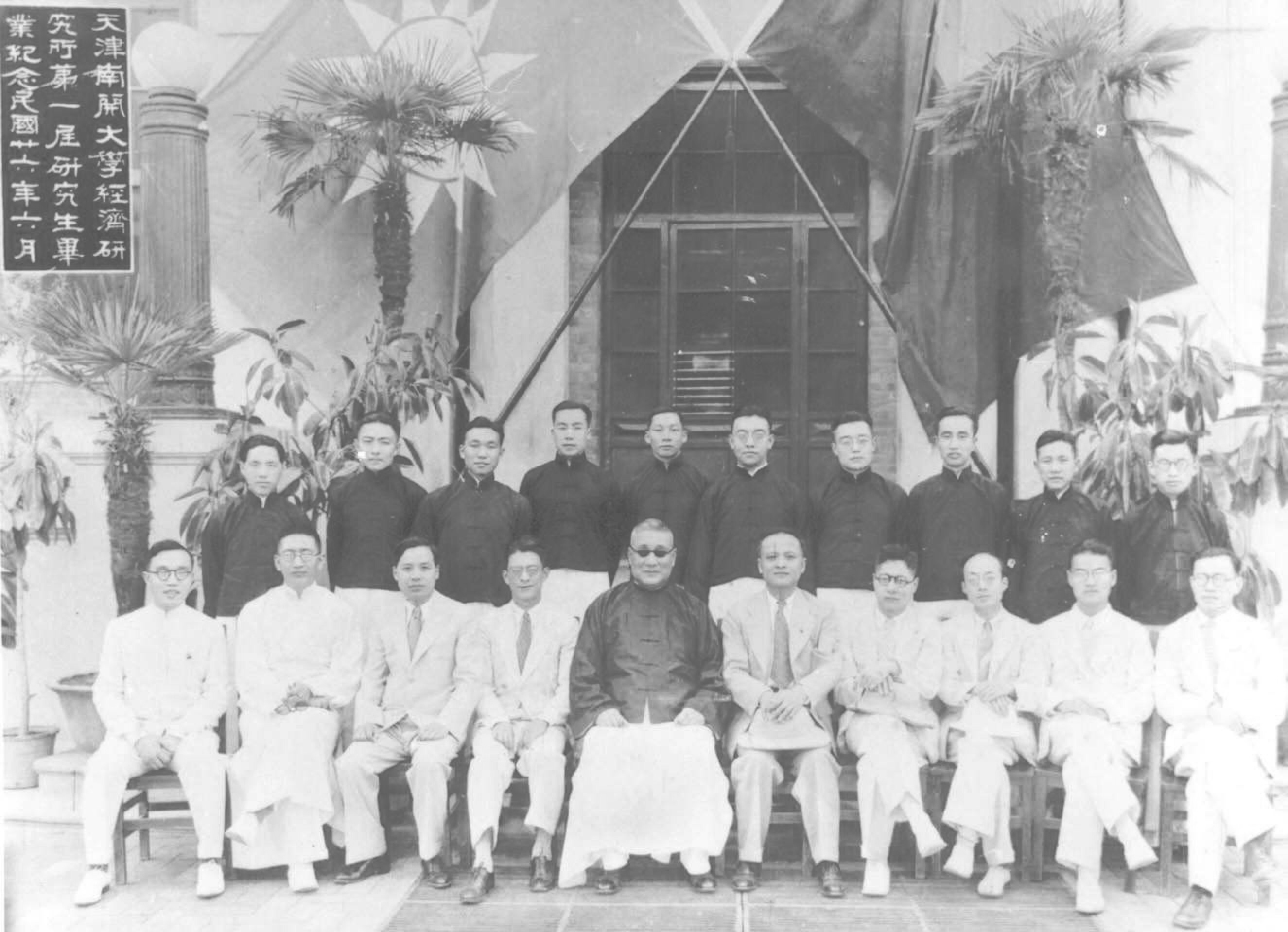
The first graduate graduation commemorative photo in 1937

In 1931, Nankai Committee of Sociology and Economics, together with Economic Studies under the School of Arts, formed the School of Economics, and the committee started to take on the role of an educational facility as well. From 1931 onwards, Nankai Institute of Economics made progress with impressive research results and its research conditions improved because of it. In the spring of 1934, the department of education of the nationalist government refused to register the School of Economics as an official institution and demanded its reorganization because the name of the school violated the regulations about "organizing university". Nankai University, therefore, had to withdraw the use of the name "School of Economics" in its official documents, and reuse the "Business School". The Economic Studies, which was previously subordinate to the School of Arts, was affiliated to the Business School. Meanwhile, because of other regulations on the establishment of institutes, the university set up "the Economic Department of Business School Institute", i.e., "Nankai Institute of Economics" (abbreviated NKIE). Later, Nankai did not follow up on the regulations of the government's department of education. Although it kept the accepted names in its official reports to the government, the university remained using the "School of Economics" and "Nankai Institute of Economics" in other occasions. The journal Nankai Index was created in the same year, and it received much attention from the academia in China and in other countries, because the journal was a reflection of Chinese economy at that period. In July 1935, NKIE started to accept postgraduate students, which were the first ones educated in China to receive master's degree of economics that were officially admitted by the department of education. In 1935, six institutions, including NKIE, Peking Union Medical College, Yenching University, Tsinghua University, University of Nanking, and China's Association for Mass Education, jointly established the "Association of Northern China's Countrysides Establishment", which was funded by the Rockefeller Foundation. He Lian was appointed as the chairman of the association and Fang Xianting the secretary. NKIE was then responsible for the training of people who could manage local governments, their financial problems and other cooperation organizations.

=== During the second Sino-Japanese war ===
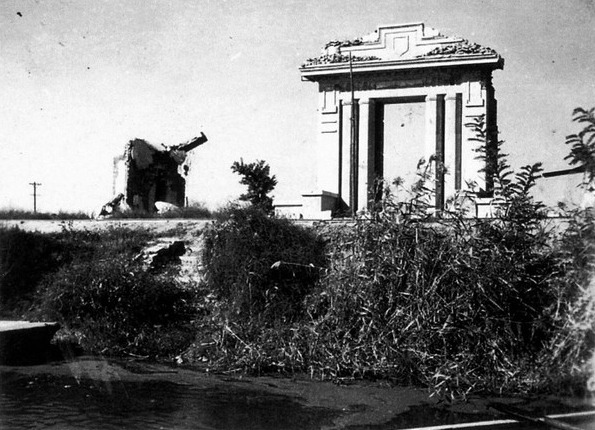
The remains of NKIE's office after Xiushan Hall was bombed

In 1936, before the war started, Zhang Boling took precautionary measures in case that Nankai University was assaulted by the Japanese army. Before the army took over Tianjin, Nankai Institute of Economics was relocated to the underground floor of Zhongshu Library in Chongqing Nankai Secondary School, and 21,000 books and research materials, which had been collected for the last dozen years, were put into 127 boxes and shipped towards south before the university was bombed. After years of transportation through Hong Kong, Haiphong and several other places, the boxes eventually arrived in Chongqing in 1940.

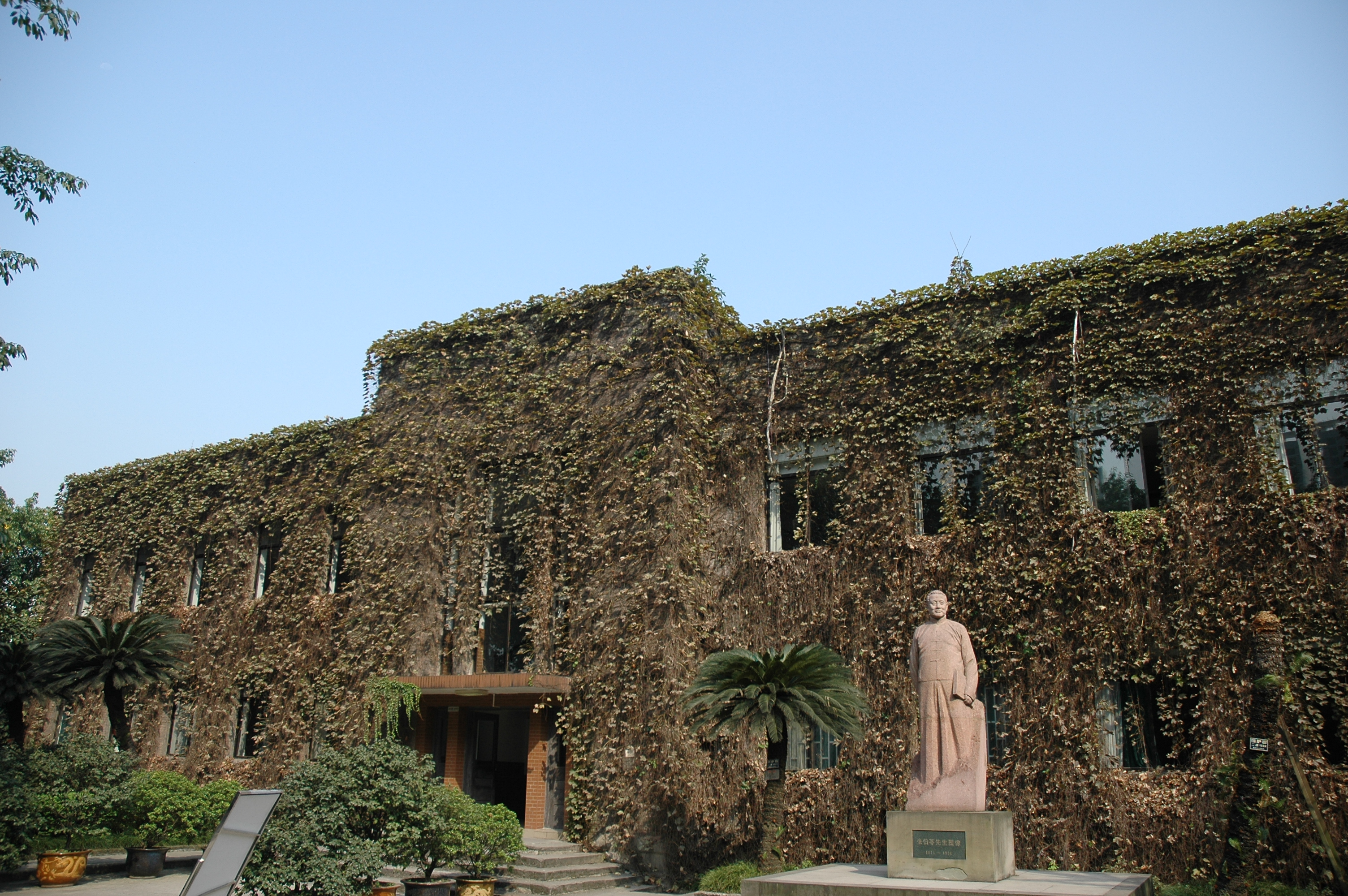
During the war, NKIE moved south and relocated in Chongqing Nankai Secondary School

On July 29, 1937, Nankai University was bombed by the Japanese army. The office of NKIE at Xiushan Hall was destroyed, but none of the faculty members were injured or dead. Since Nankai University and other universities coalesced and formed National Southwestern Associated University, NKIE then changed its name into Economic Studies under the Business School Institute of National Southwestern Associated University. By 1939, the institute had been reestablished at the library of Chongqing Nankai Secondary School, and it had also set up an agency in Kunming (where the Associated University was located).

=== During the Chinese civil war ===
In April 1946, Chiang Kai-shek signed the proposal to transform Nankai University from a private school into a national public university. On May 4, National Southwestern Associated University held its annual graduation ceremony. It then announced the disintegration of the university on July 31, and Nankai University moved back to Tianjin and resumed its operation. In December, NKIE returned to Tianjin, but many funds that it previously received from abroad such as Rockefeller Foundation and Institute of the Pacific Relations had stopped because of its status as a public university. The researches were therefore influenced due to the lack of financial support.

In September 1947, after leaving the Kuomintang government, He Lian and Fang Xianting established an independent "Chinese Economic Research Institute" in Shanghai on the support of Zhou Zuomin and Dai Zimu, the chairman and the associate manager of Kincheng Banking Corporation, in order to retain the personnel of NKIE. This institute acted as a branch of NKIE, with Fang Xianting as its director, while the members were mostly previous employees at NKIE and other graduate students of NKIE.

=== From 1949 onwards ===
After 1949, since Marxian economics gained traction in mainland China, He Lian, Fang Xianting and other founders moved abroad one after another. Because it used to receive funds from foreign organizations like Rockefeller Foundation, Nankai Institute of Economics became a target of political oppression. It was demanded to be reformed, while many faculty members received unfair treatment. In 1952, after the reformation of higher education institutions, NKIE once stopped operating. In 1958, Hebei's Institute of Economics of Chinese Academy of Sciences was established on the basis of the old NKIE, but it was still located inside the campus of Nankai University. The independent Hebei's Institute of Economics kept its academic communication with the School of Economics of Nankai University, and many academic conferences were held among these institutions.

In May 1959, the prime minister Zhou Enlai visited Nankai University, and he was in support of the operation of NKIE. He asked, "why won't He Lian return to China? He has every right to come back." Besides this, Zhou Enlai also asked people to send his regards to He Lian and invite him to return when he met with guests from abroad. In 1962, Hebei's Institute of Economics was to be shut down, and Zhou Enlai instructed Nankai University to take over it and change its name back to Nankai Institute of Economics, with the director of the School of Economics Ji Taoda as its director, and both the dean of the School of Economics Teng Weizao and the associate director Tao Jikan as its associate directors. The institute then set up four research branches, i.e. Socialist Economy, U.S. Economy, Oceania Economy and History of Modern China's Economy.

During the Cultural Revolution, the research at NKIE was often put into halts, and the research branches did not resume their works until 1973. In December 1979, Political Economics: Socialist Part, edited by the director of NKIE Gu Shutang, was officially published and became the widely-used textbook of economics among the universities in the northern China, so it was called the "northern edition". This book broke the frame of a typical Soviet Union's textbook, absorbed the newest research results and went through several revisions. It was then considered an influential volume by the educational sphere of economics in China. In 1984, NKIE started to work on the major state research project "the formation of planned price" and was authorized to grant doctorates to students.

In 1987, the subdivision of Global Economy of NKIE became a separate Nankai Institute of International Economy. In 1988, proposed by the geographer Bao Juemin, the director of the Cultural Geography Studies of the Geographical Society of China, NKIE opened a new research branch of Economic Geography, which was the first research facility of economic geography set under an institute of economics. From 1994 to 1998, Chen Zongsheng took the position of the director of NKIE and focused the research on the problems of individual incomes and the transformation of economic system in developing countries. In 2002, the research branch of Urban and Regional Economy became the independent Institute of Urban and Regional Economy.

On September 10, 2012, Nankai Institute of Economics celebrated its 85 years of operation. In October 2017, the previous director Chen Zongsheng won the eighth China's Economic Theory Innovation Award for his theory of "income distribution in China's economic transformation and development".

== Academic researches ==
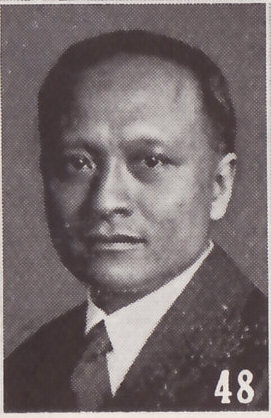
He Lian, the first director of NKIE

He Lian, the founder of NKIE, believes that price is the center of all economic activities according to the theory of economics, while statistics and price index are "the barometer of economy" to observe the changing price and "examine the purchasing power of the currency", which should be "referred to when doing business". When Nankai Committee of Sociology and Economics was first established in September 1927, they decided to start their research with the compilation of a wholesale price index in Beijing, Tianjin and Hebei. As the institute grew larger and the research area expanded, the index began to include quantity of import and export commodities and wholesale price in China; rate of foreign currencies in Tianjin and Shanghai; price of domestic currency, price of silver, customer price, price of essential commodities and living cost in Shanghai; wholesale price and living cost of workers in Tianjin; salary in large cities and counties; price of commodities in Chongqing during wartime, income of teachers, living costs of landlords, businessmen and workers in Chongqing; and industrial productivity in Northern China during wartime. Many of these indexes were important guides to study the economy in China during that period. For instance, the English economic historian Richard H. Tawney wrote Land and Labor in China during his visit to China from 1929 to 1930, making use of the materials and research results of NKIE.
