= Xiushan Hall =

Building of Nankai University

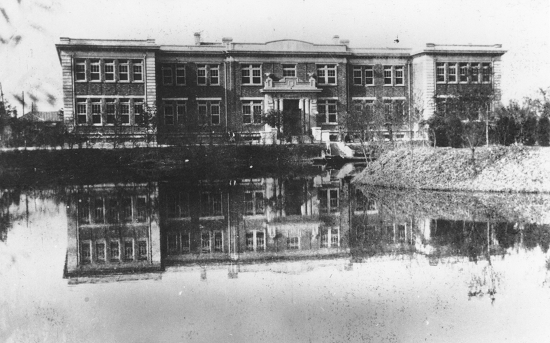
Xiushan Hall, Nankai University

Xiushan Hall was an early building of Nankai University in Tianjin, China. Completed in 1924, it served as the administrative office and teaching building for the humanities and business. The Nankai Institute of Economics used to work here. The building was constructed with funds donated by Li Chun; it was named "Xiushan Hall," and a bronze statue of Li Xiushan was cast to commemorate it. On September 10, 1927, the Social and Nankai Institute of Economics was established in Xiushantang. On July 30, 1937, Xiushan Hall was destroyed by Japanese bombing.

At present, the original site of Xiushantang is now the Nankai University Kindergarten.

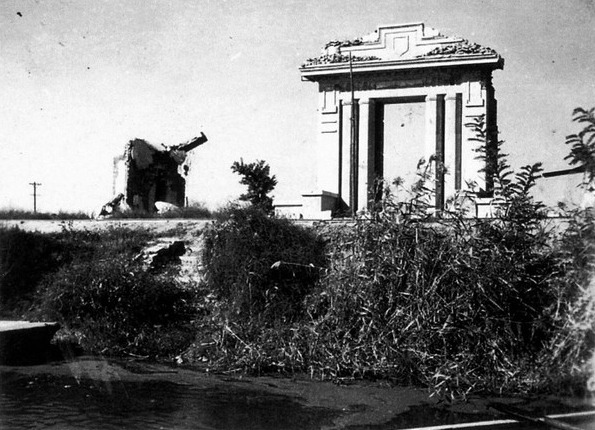
The remains of Xiushan Hall after it was bombed

In October 2016, the groundbreaking ceremony for the reconstruction of Muzhai Hall, Xiushan Hall, and Siyuan Hall was held at the Jinnan Campus of Nankai University. Xiushan Hall will be rebuilt along with three important historical buildings in the history of Nankai University, including Muzhai Hall and Siyuan Hall, at the Jinnan Campus of Nankai University.
