= Yang Shixian =

Chinese chemist (1897–1985)

Yang Shixian (Chinese: 杨石先; January 8, 1897 – February 19, 1985) was a Chinese chemist. He was a member of the Chinese Academy of Sciences.
