= Tianjin Institute of Foreign Trade =

Public college in Tianjin, China (1983–1994)

- 天津对外贸易学院
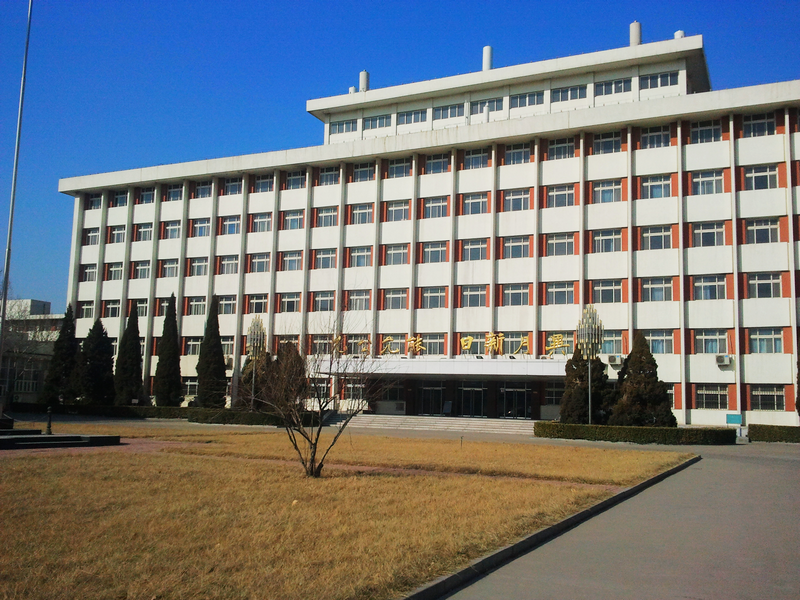
- Type: Public university
- Active: January 1983–November 15, 1994
- Affiliations: Ministry of Foreign Trade and Economic Cooperation of the People's Republic of China
- President: Xin Shulin
- Location: Tianjin Nankai District 100 Yingshui Road, China
- Campus: 207 acres (84 ha); Garden-style campus

Tianjin Institute of Foreign Trade was a Chinese higher education facility established in January 1983. It was one of the four higher education institutions directly under the Ministry of Foreign Trade and Economic Cooperation. The institute was located at 100 Yingshui Road, Nankai District, Tianjin, China. In 1994, Tianjin Institute of Foreign Trade was disestablished and merged into Nankai University.

== History ==
After the reform and opening-up, China decided to vigorously develop foreign trade and urgently needed to cultivate a large number of specialized foreign trade talents. Therefore, it was necessary to systematically develop new foreign trade universities. Considering various factors such as the foreign trade development situation in different regions, the conditions for running schools, and the distribution of institutions, the Ministry of Foreign Trade and Economic Cooperation decided to restore the Shanghai Foreign Trade College (now Shanghai University of International Business and Economics) and establish foreign trade colleges in the coastal port cities of Tianjin and Guangzhou.

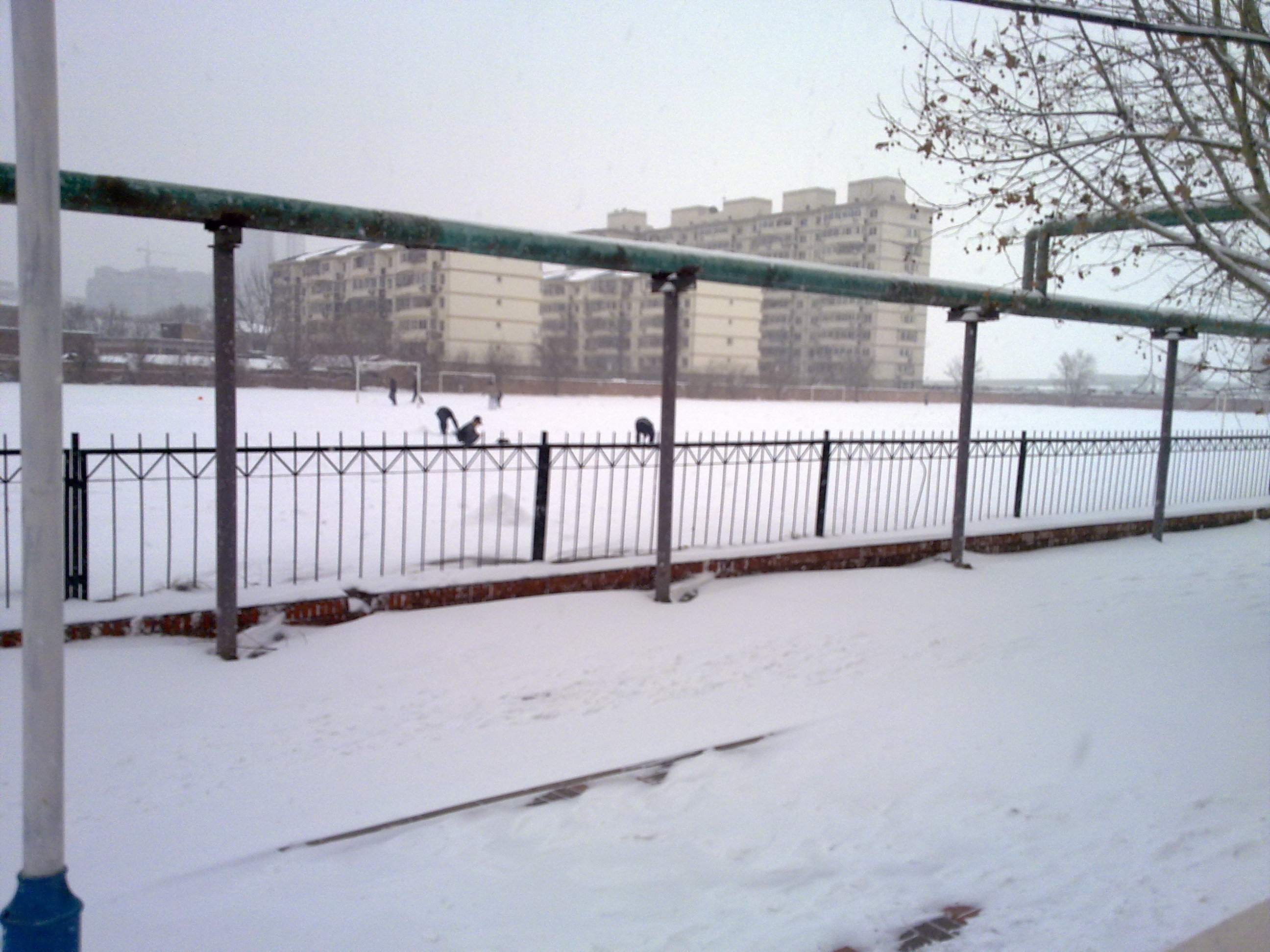
Campus of Tianjin Institute of Foreign Trade

Tianjin Institute of Foreign Trade began preparations in September 1979 and was officially approved by the State Council in January 1983. At its inception, the institute used the facilities of the Tianjin Foreign Trade Secondary Vocational School on Wangchuan Road. In July 1987, it moved to a new campus on Yingshui Road.

In 1988, Tianjin Institute of Foreign Trade established a sister-school relationship with the College of Business Administration at Kent State University in the United States. In April 1994, then Vice Premier Li Lanqing, who had previously served as Vice Mayor of Tianjin and Minister of the Ministry of Foreign Trade and Economic Cooperation, proposed merging Tianjin Institute of Foreign Trade into Nankai University. On October 14, 1994, the State Education Commission and the Ministry of Foreign Trade and Economic Cooperation signed the "Protocol on the Merger of Tianjin Institute of Foreign Trade into Nankai University," officially deciding to merge the institute into Nankai University. The formal merger took place on November 15, 1994.

On December 26, 1994, the 13th meeting of the Nankai University Party Committee Standing Committee decided to abolish the establishment of Tianjin Institute of Foreign Trade from the date of the merger. According to the overall planning for reform and development at Nankai University, as well as the plans for professional and disciplinary development, Nankai University established the International Business School, which included three departments and one institute: the Department of International Economics and Trade, the Department of International Business Management, the Department of Foreign Trade Languages, and the Institute of International Economic Research.

In 1996, the International Business School of Nankai University moved to the main campus (Balitai Campus) and was later renamed the Nankai University Business School.

The original site is now the Yingshui Road Campus of Nankai University. Nankai University plans to transfer the Yingshui Road Campus to Tianjin City and use the funds obtained for the construction of a new campus in the Haihe Education Park.

== Departments and programs ==
The institute had three departments: Foreign Trade Languages, Foreign Trade Economics, and International Business Management. It offered six programs: Foreign Trade English, Foreign Trade Japanese, International Business Management, Foreign Trade Statistics, International Trade, and Industrial Foreign Trade.

== Campus facilities ==
The main building of the campus, located at the entrance, was a seven-story frame structure facing south, used for teaching purposes. To the east of the main building was the administrative building; to the west were the student dormitories and service building. The library moved to a new building in October 1992. Before November 1994, it was the Tianjin Institute of Foreign Trade Library. After the merger in November 1994, it became the Yingshui Road Campus Branch of the Nankai University Library.

== See also ==
- The other three universities directly under the Ministry of Foreign Trade and Economic Cooperation: Beijing Institute of Foreign Trade, Shanghai Institute of Foreign Trade, Guangzhou Institute of Foreign Trade
