= Tianjin First Central Hospital =

Hospital in Tianjin, China

Coordinates: 39.100224°N 117.145424°E

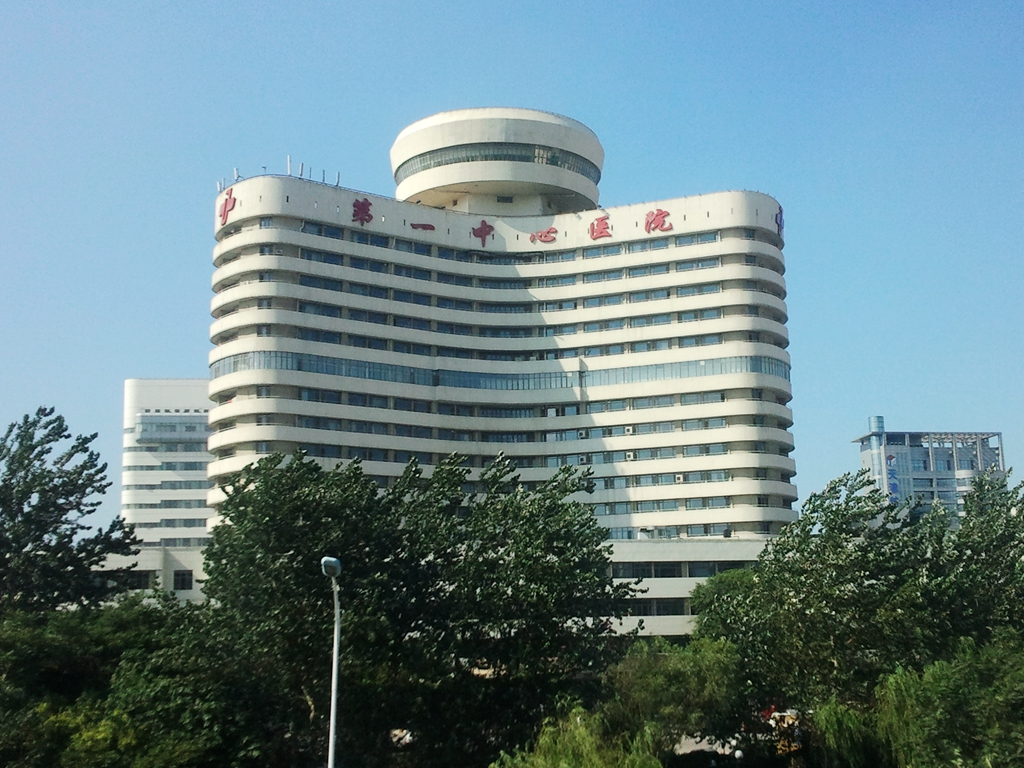
Hospital building

Tianjin First Central Hospital (Chinese: 天津市第一中心医院) is a hospital in the Chinese metropolis of Tianjin. In addition to other medical services and teaching, it is a major center for liver transplants and otorhinolaryngological diagnosis. It was founded in 1949.

== See also ==
- Yizhongxinyiyuan station
