= He Qifang =

Chinese writer (1912–1977)

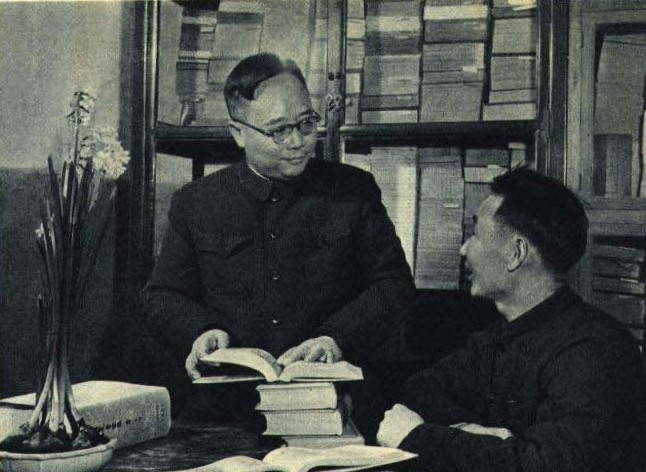
He Qifang (left) in 1962

He Qifang (5 February 1912 – 24 July 1977; Chinese: 何其芳; pinyin: Hé Qífāng) was a Chinese poet, essayist, literary critic and redologist. He was born in Wanxian, Sichuan Province, which is now Wanzhou District, Chongqing Municipality. He studied Philosophy at Peking University. Later in his life, he served as the director of the Institute of Literature at the Chinese Academy of Social Sciences.

== Works ==
- (preface) Stories of Not Fearing Ghosts, 1961
