= Li Jitong =

- 李继侗
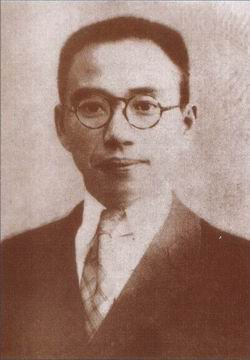
- Born: 24 August 1897; Xinghua, Jiangsu, Qing China
- Died: 12 December 1961 (aged 64); Hohhot, Inner Mongolia, China

Academic background
- Education: Shanghai YMCA High School; St. John's University; University of Nanking (BS); Yale Forest School (MS, PhD)

Li Jitong (also romanized as Tsi-tung Li, simplified Chinese: 李继侗; traditional Chinese: 李繼侗; 24 August 1897 – 12 December 1961) was a Chinese botanist and member of the Chinese Academy of Sciences.

== Biography ==
Li was born on August 24, 1897, in Xinghua, Jiangsu, Qing China. He spent his childhood in his hometown, and in 1912, he was admitted to the Shanghai YMCA High School before transferring to St. John's University High School two years later. He graduated from high school in 1916 and enrolled in St. John's University. Because of the high tuition fees at St. John's University, he transferred to University of Nanking to study forestry and graduated in 1921.

After graduating from the University of Nanking, he received government funding to move to the United States and enrolled in the Yale Forest School. In 1923, he graduated with a master's degree. In 1925, he received a PhD with the doctoral thesis on "Soil Temperature as Influenced by Forest Cover".

After graduation, he returned to teach at the University of Nanking, and in 1926, he moved to Nankai University to teach in the Department of Biology. He was reportedly the first Chinese In 1929, he moved to Tsinghua University, where he became a professor. That same year, Li published a paper on the transient effects of photosynthesis in the 43rd volume of Annals of Botany. After the outbreak of the Second Sino-Japanese War, he moved to Yunnan with Tsinghua University. While in Yunnan, he was a professor at the National Southwestern Associated University, and in 1946 he moved back to Beijing with Tsinghua University. In 1952, the national faculty reorganization led to the merger of the Biology Department of Tsinghua University and the Biology Department of Peking University, which brought him to teach at Peking University. He was elected as a member of the Chinese Academy of Sciences in the 1950s. In 1957, he became vice president of Inner Mongolia University.

He died on December 12, 1961, in Hohhot due to illness. Li has been recognized as a pioneer for the study of plant physiology in China.
