= Franklin Ho =

Chinese economist

- 何廉
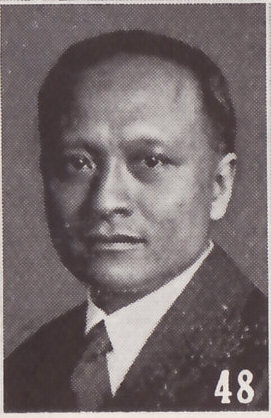
- Born: 1895; Hunan, Great Qing
- Died: July 5, 1975 (aged 79–80); New York City, USA
- Education: Pomona College, 1923; Yale University, after 1923

Franklin Lien Ho (Chinese: 何廉, 1895–1975) was a Chinese economist influential in the Republic of China. He was the director of the Political Department of the Cabinet and later the Vice Minister of Economic Affairs. He was also director general of the Agricultural Credit Administration. He founded the economics department at Nankai University and later served as the university's acting president in 1947 and 1948. He then emigrated to the United States and joined the faculty of Columbia University, retiring in 1960. Ho was elected a member of Academia Sinica in 1962.

Ho was born in Hunan province, China, and attended college in the United States, graduating from Pomona College in 1923 and later from Yale University. He died in New York City.
