= Teng Weizao =

Chinese economist and educator

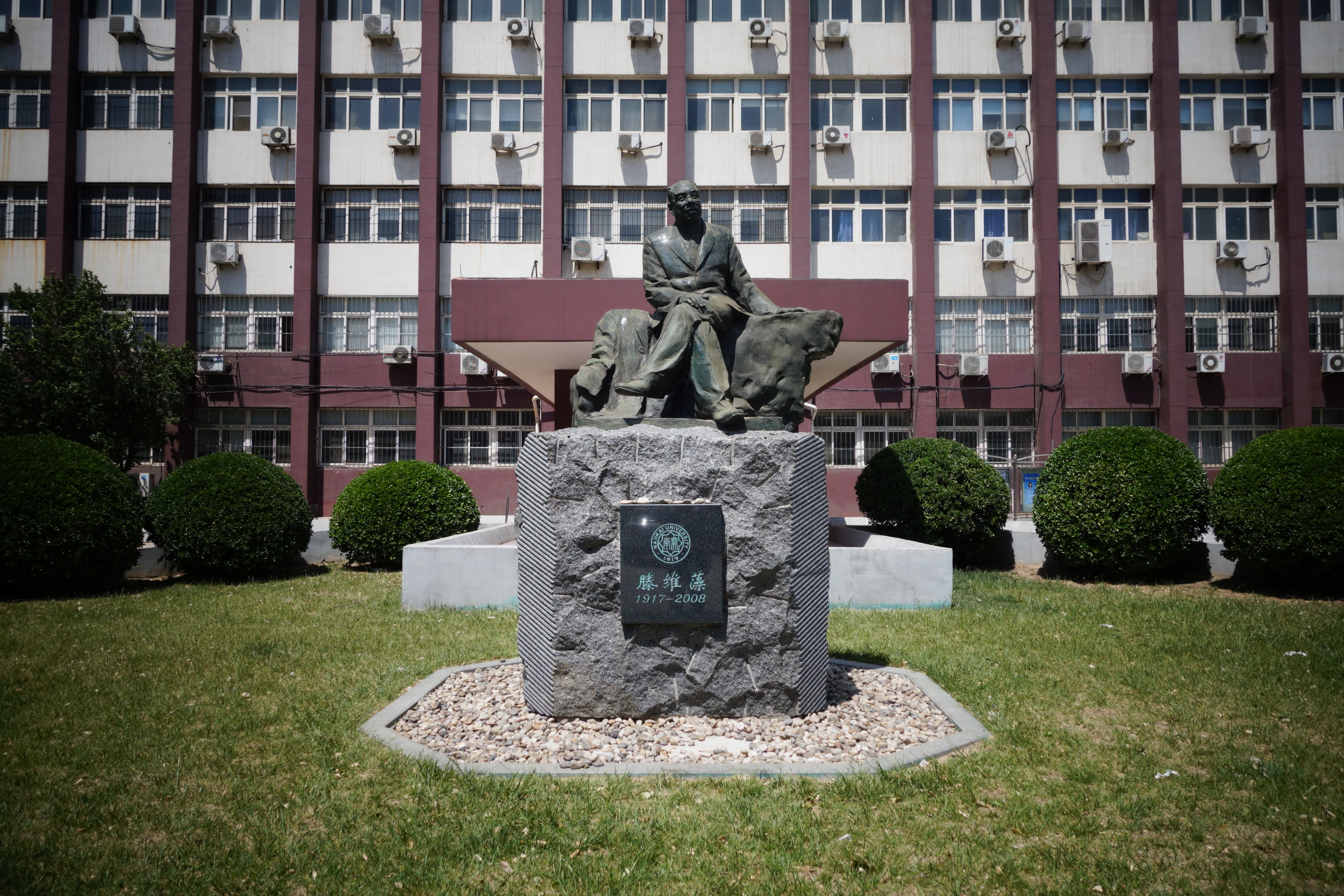
Statue of Teng Weizao at Nankai University.

Teng Weizao (simplified Chinese: 滕维藻; traditional Chinese: 滕維藻; 1917–2008) was a Chinese economist and educator. He served as President of Nankai University, and the Chairman of China and United States Economic Association (中國美國經濟學會). Teng was a pioneer of Chinese modern economics study, especially in the fields of multinational corporation and Japanese economy.

== Life ==
Teng was born in Funing County, Jiangsu Province in January 1917. He graduated from the Department of Agriculture Economics, Zhejiang University in 1942. He did his postgraduate study at the National Southwestern Associated University during the Second Sino-Japanese War.

1946, Teng was pointed as a teacher of Nankai University. From 1950-1953, he served as the dean of the School of Economics, Nankai University. From October 1981 to January 1986, He was the President of Nankai University.

When Teng died in 2008, many prominent Chinese politicians came to his funeral.

== Academic positions ==
- Chairman, China and United States Economic Association
- Vice-chairman, Chinese World Economy Association

== Work ==
- Transnational Corporations and China's Open Door Policy
