= Affiliated Senior High School of National Taiwan Normal University =

High school in Taipei, Taiwan

Coordinates: 25°02′06.59″N 121°32′26.42″E

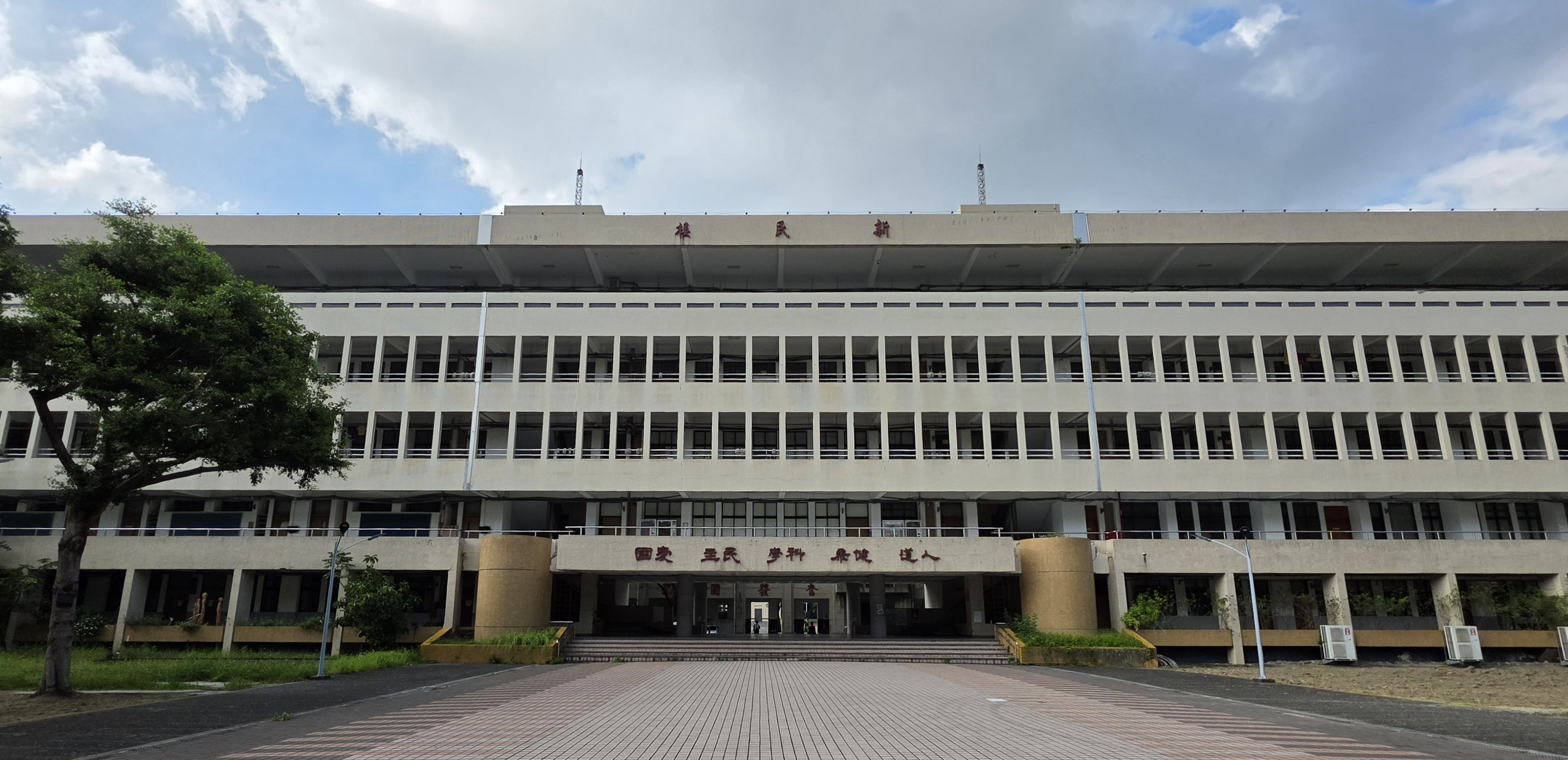
- 143 Xinyi Road, Section 3 Taipei, Taiwan 106

Information
- Type: Uni High (University High School)
- Motto: Be Humanistic, Be Athletic, Be Scientific, Be Democratic, Be Patriotic 人道、健康、科學、民主、愛國
- Established: 1947
- School district: Da-an District, Taipei City
- Principal: Wang Shu-Li 王淑麗
- Staff: 299
- Grades: 7th–9th in junior high school, and 10th–12th (1st–3rd) in senior high school
- Enrollment: Approximately 3,100 in senior high school, 700 in junior high school. Total enrollment is 3,900.
- Affiliation: National Taiwan Normal University
- Campus: 83925 square meters
- Website: www.hs.ntnu.edu.tw

The Affiliated Senior High School of National Taiwan Normal University (HSNU; Chinese: 國立臺灣師範大學附屬高級中學; pinyin: Guólì Táiwān Shīfàn Dàxué Fùshǔ Gāojí Zhōngxué) is a senior high school in Daan District, Taipei, Taiwan. It is ranked top 2 among all the senior high schools in Taiwan, usually with a requirement of PR98 and above on the National Senior High School Entrance Exams.

== History ==
HSNU was founded in Taiwan as "Taipei Third State High School" in 1937 under Japanese rule. Until the end of World War II, ninety percent of the student body was Japanese.

On December 5, 1945, the government of the Republic of China changed the school's name to "Taiwan Third Provincial High School" and then again on January 1, 1946, to "Taiwan Provincial Taipei He-ping High School." Under the name "He-ping High School," the school's purpose was to educate Japanese children who did not return to Japan; at the time, most of the teachers were Japanese.

In 1947, China's political situation changed again. Government administrators' families who had lived in mainland China came to Taiwan, and the government let their children to study at He-ping High School. At that time, Taiwan Provincial Teachers' College (now National Taiwan Normal University) was preparing to establish an experimental high school as a teachers' training ground, so the college applied for the establishment of a new school. On August 1, 1947, He-ping High School became "The Affiliated Senior High School of Taiwan Provincial Teachers' College." There was also a junior high school section. In October 1949, the school took in 310 students from the National Revolutionary Army's Children's School, the largest number taken by a school in that area.

In 1955, the name of the governing teachers' college was changed to "Normal University." In 1961, the junior high school section closed, and in 1967, the teachers' college changed names once again, from "Provincial" to "National;" thus, the high school's name became "The Affiliated High School of National Taiwan Normal University." However, it was not until an associate professor of the NTNU's Education Department, Huang Zhen-Qiu, became HSNU's principal, were the high school and the university closely tied.

The film Blue Gate Crossing portrays school life in HSNU.

== School features ==
=== Graduation ceremony ===
The annual graduation ceremony is an event organized and decorated solely by students that have been admitted into university. The team of students adorn the settings of ceremony to a theme, arrange the entertainment programs and shoot their own music videos. This event is reported by the mass media every year.

=== Uniform ===
Under Japanese rule, boys' high school uniforms in Taiwan were similar to military uniforms, khaki from top to bottom. In 1983, HSNU changed the uniform to a light blue button-down shirt with dark blue trousers. The girls' uniform was designed when girls started to enroll in the school's music program. The girls' uniform consisted of a white button-down shirt and a light blue suit skirt (with double folds down the front). The girls' uniform comes with an optional blazer jacket that matches the skirt. Most choose to wear the more comfortable black tracksuit jacket.

=== Experimental classes ===
In addition to normal classes, there have been experimental classes in HSNU. For example, between 1950 and 1961, HSNU tried a system with a four-year junior high school with two years of senior high school. The experimental science class was established in 1978 (Class 420 and Class 430 were created in the first year). In the year 2004, the Honors English Class (also known as, "English Experimental Class") was established. The first class was Senior High Class 1111. HSNU also take students from diplomatic families and foreign expats.

== Notable alumni ==
- Liu Kuo-song – Senior High Class 16, painter.
- Lien Chan – Senior High Class 24, Vice President of the Republic of China, Chairman of Kuomintang.
- Koh Se-kai – Senior High Class 24, Taiwan independence movement, as of 2007 Ambassador of Republic of China in Japan.
- Chen Li-an – Senior High Class 30, President of the Control Yuan of the Republic of China.
- Gu Long – Junior High Class 36, (real name Xiong Yaohua) Taiwanese writer of wuxia novels.
- Mao Gao-wen – Senior High Class 37, Minister of the Republic of China Ministry of Education and Vice President of the Examination Yuan in Republic of China (Taiwan).
- Liu Chao-han – Experimental Class 1, President of National Central University.
- R. C. T. Lee – Senior High Class 41, professor, President of the National Chi Nan University and Providence University.
- Wu Cheng-wen – Experimental Class 4, President of National Health Research Institutes, as of 2007 an academic at Academia Sinica.
- Wu Po-hsiung – Experimental Class 5, Minister of the Interior Ministry, as of 2007 Vice President of Kuomintang.
- Taylor Gun-Jin Wang – Senior High Class 57, scientist, first Chinese astronaut.
- Chang Po-ya – Experimental Class 10, Mayor of Chiayi City.
- Zhou Yu – Senior High Class 100, 紫藤盧 負責人。
- Hsia Chu-joe – Senior High Class 103, professor of 台大城鄉所.
- Chang An-lo – Senior High Class 132, "White Wolf", United Bamboo Gang's boss. He killed Chiang Nan in the United States and has since been in jail in America.
- Luo Wen-jia – Senior High Class 509, a legislator from Democratic Progressive Party between 2002 and 2004, a major member of Council for Hakka Affairs between 2004 and 2005.
- Mayday – four members of the band are alumni
- Evan Yo – Senior High Class 1046 (Music Class), pop singer signed with Sony BMG; his debut album was "19".
- Wu Tsing-fong – Singer, lead vocalist of the band Sodagreen.

== See also ==
- National Taiwan Normal University
