= Shu Shien-Siu =

Taiwanese mathematician (1912–2001)

- 徐賢修
- Born: 12 September 1912; Yongjia, Wenzhou, Zhejiang, Republic of China
- Died: 17 November 2001 (aged 89)
- Education: Tsinghua University (BS); Brown University (PhD)
- Awards: Academician of the Academia Sinica
- Scientific career
- Fields: Mathematics
- Institutions: Purdue University; National Taiwan University; National Chiao Tung University; National Tsing Hua University; National Science Council; Industrial Technology Research Institute; Hsinchu Science and Industrial Park
- Thesis: On The Method Of Successive Approximations Applied To Compressible Flow Problems (1948)

Shu Shien-Siu (Chinese: 徐賢修; pinyin: Xú Xiánxiū; 1912–2001), also known as S. S. Shu, was a Taiwanese mathematician, engineer and educator.

== Biography ==
Shu was born in Yongjia, Wenzhou, Zhejiang on 12 September 1912. Shu studied at Wenzhou High School. In 1935, Shu graduated from the Department of Mathematics of Tsinghua University in Beijing and obtained a B.S. in mathematics. He worked as a teaching assistant at the department after his graduation.

In 1944, Shu went to the United States for graduate studies and entered Brown University. Shu obtained his PhD in applied mathematics in 1948 under the guidance of Charles Loewner. In 1949, Shu worked in Princeton, and in that summer went to the Massachusetts Institute of Technology to do his postdoctoral research. Shu was a professor of engineering science at Purdue University, and the Chair of Purdue University School of Aeronautics and Astronautics.

Shu was also an adjunct professor of National Taiwan University (in Taipei), National Chiao Tung University, and the National Tsing Hua University (both in Hsinchu) in Taiwan. In 1961, Shu founded the Department of Mathematics at the National Tsing Hua University (NTHU), and held summer mathematical seminar annually. From 1970 to 1975, Shu was the President of the National Tsing Hua University. In 1973, Shu invited Mao Gao-wen to be the Dean of NTHU's engineering faculty, Shen Chun-shan to be the Dean of science faculty, and Fung Yan-Hsiung (馮彥雄) to be the Dean of Nuclear Science and Technology. In Shu's office, National Tsing Hua University developed into a first-class comprehensive university of Taiwan.

From 1973 to 1980, Shu was in charge of the National Science Council (under the Executive Yuan) of Taiwan. From 1979 to 1988, Shu was the chairman and director-general of the Industrial Technology Research Institute. Shu advised to establish the world-famous Hsinchu Science and Industrial Park (HSIP), thus he is widely known as the "Father of HSIP".

== Contributions and honors ==
Shu made great contributions to Taiwan's education, especially to its mathematical education and higher education. He also contributed greatly to the development of Taiwan's economy and industry, especially Taiwan's high-tech industries. Shu received an honorary doctorate from Purdue University in 1993 and also elected Academician of the Academia Sinica in Taiwan.

== Family ==
Shu's son, Frank Shu, an astrophysicist, was born in Kunming during the Second Sino-Japanese War. Frank is former President of the American Astronomical Society (AAS), and like his father, has also served as President of National Tsing Hua University.
