= Zappone =

Zappone is an Italian surname. Notable people with the surname include:

- Katherine Zappone (born 1953), American-born Irish politician
- Mary Zappone (born 1964), American businesswoman
- Tony Zappone (born 1947), American journalist
- Veronica Zappone (born 1993), Italian curler

== Other uses ==
- Zappone v. Revenue Commissioners, 2006 Irish lawsuit
