= Li Yih-yuan =

Taiwanese anthropologist (1931–2017)

Li Yih-yuan (Chinese: 李亦園; Pe̍h-ōe-jī: Lí E̍k-oân; 20 August 1931 – 18 April 2017) was a Taiwanese anthropologist.

== Life and career ==
A native of Quanzhou, Fujian, born in 1931, Li moved to Taiwan in 1948 and graduated from National Taiwan University in 1953. Two years later, he began working at Academia Sinica. In 1960, Li earned his master's degree from Harvard University. He was elected to membership within Academia Sinica in 1984. That same year, he founded the College of Humanities and Social Sciences at National Tsing Hua University, serving as dean of the college until 1990. Li remained on the faculty until 1999, a year after he had retired from Academia Sinica. He later taught at National Taiwan University as an adjunct professor. Li was founding president of the Chiang Ching-kuo Foundation from 1989 to 2001, when he assumed the foundation chairmanship, yielding the latter position in 2010.

In later life, Li was diagnosed with heart disease. He fell ill with pneumonia in 2017, and died on 18 April that year, aged 85, while seeking treatment at the Taipei Medical University Hospital. The Academia Sinica held a memorial service for Li in September 2017. Subsequently, in November 2018, the Academia Sinica invited P. Steven Sangren to give the inaugural Li Yih-yuan Memorial Lecture.

== Li Yih-yuan Memorial Lecturers ==
- P. Steven Sangren (2018)
- John Comaroff (2019)
