= Chu Yun-han =

Taiwanese political scientist (1956–2023)

- 朱雲漢
- Born: 3 February 1956; Taipei, Taiwan
- Died: 5 February 2023 (aged 67); Taipei, Taiwan
- Occupation: Political scientist

Academic background
- Education: National Taiwan University (BA, MA); University of Minnesota (PhD)

Academic work
- Discipline: Political science
- Institutions: Academia Sinica

Chu Yun-han (simplified Chinese: 朱云汉; traditional Chinese: 朱雲漢; pinyin: Zhū Yúnhàn; Wade–Giles: Chu Yun-han; 3 February 1956 – 5 February 2023) was a Taiwanese political scholar, and an academician of the Academia Sinica.

== Biography ==
Chu was born in Taipei, Taiwan, on 3 February 1956, while his ancestral home is in Zhuji, Zhejiang. He attended the Affiliated Senior High School of National Taiwan Normal University. After completing his master's degree in political science from National Taiwan University in 1979, he entered the University of Minnesota where he obtained his doctoral degree in political science in 1987.

After university, Chu became a specially-appointed research fellow of the Institute of Political Science, Academia Sinica. He was also a professor of the Department of Politics, National Taiwan University.

Chu and his NTU colleague, Hu Fo, established the Taiwan-based Asian Barometer Survey in 2000. In 2004, the cross-national survey project helped start the Global Barometer Survey alongside four other regional survey programs. At the time of Chu's death, the ABS was carried out in nineteen Asia-Pacific nations.

Chu was elected a member of Academia Sinica in 2012, and a fellow of The World Academy of Sciences in 2016. He was a 2014 recipient of the University of Minnesota College of Liberal Arts Outstanding Achievement Award, as well.

Chu died of rectal cancer at home in Taipei, on 5 February 2023, at the age of 67. When he died, Chu was serving as president of the Chiang Ching-kuo Foundation for International Scholarly Exchange. The organization scheduled a memorial at the Chiang Ching-kuo Presidential Library for 30 April 2023. Following his death, Taiwan Insight, a publication of the University of Nottingham's Taiwan studies program, published a special issue.

== Publications ==
- Crafting Democracy in Taiwan. Taiwan: Institute for National Policy Research. 1992. ISBN 9789579041331.
- Jie, Lu; Yun-han, Chu (2021). Understandings of Democracy: Origins and Consequences Beyond Western Democracies. United States: Oxford University Press. ISBN 9780197570401.
- 台湾民主转型的经验与启示 [Taiwan's Experience and Inspiration in Democratic Transition] (in Chinese). Beijing: Social Science Literature Press. 2012. ISBN 9787509729113.
- 高思在云 中国兴起与全球秩序重组 [The Rise of China and the Reorganization of Global Order] (in Chinese). Beijing: Renmin University of China Press. 2015. ISBN 9787300217437.
- 全球化的裂解与再融合 [The Future of Globalization] (in Chinese). Beijing: CITIC Publishing Group. 2021. ISBN 9787521735963.
