= Huang Shiyue (general) =

Chinese general (1980 to 1955)

Huang Shiyue (黃師岳, 1890–1955), courtesy name Chuxiao, was a native of Tongcheng, Anhui Province. He was a lieutenant general in the Republic of China Army. In 1938, he led over 300 teachers and students on a long march from the National Changsha Provisional University in Changsha to the newly established National Southwest Associated University in Kunming.

== Biography ==
Huang Shiyue was born in Tongcheng, Anhui Province in 1890. He worked as a primary school teacher in his early years. In 1920, he entered the third term of the Northeast Military Academy. After graduation, he joined the Northeast Army as a grassroots officer.

In 1929, he was appointed commander of the 24th Infantry Brigade of the Northeast Army. In 1930, the 24th Brigade was renamed the 17th Brigade, and he continued to command it. In 1933, the 17th Brigade was renamed the 117th Division, and he became its commander. He was later transferred to serve as director of the Third Department of the Military Commission's Peking Branch. In 1936, he was promoted to lieutenant general, and entered the Army University as an auditor.

In February 1938, after the outbreak of the Second Sino-Japanese War, Huang Shiyue was ordered by Zhang Zhizhong, Chairman of the Hunan Provincial Government, to lead the Hunan-Guizhou-Yunnan Tour Group of the National Changsha Provisional University. He led over 300 teachers and students on a march from Changsha to the newly established National Southwest Associated University in Kunming.

He was subsequently appointed commander of the 13th Guerrilla Column of the Fifth War Zone. After the end of the Anti-Japanese War, he served as a counselor of the Northeast Bandit Suppression Headquarters and a member of the Ministry of National Defense stationed at the Northeast Bandit Suppression Headquarters in 1948. In October, he served as a liaison officer of the Ninth Corps Headquarters. In November, he was captured by the Chinese People's Liberation Army in Shenyang.

After the founding of the People's Republic of China, Huang Shiyue went to study at the North China People's Revolutionary University. In December 1950, he served as a counselor of the Guangxi Provincial People's Committee. He died of illness in Nanning on October 1, 1955, and was buried in the Huangdiling Cemetery in the northeast suburbs of Nanning.

== Hunan-Guizhou-Yunnan Tour Group ==
On February 19, 1938, 336 teachers and students began their migration from Changsha in Hunan to Kunming in Yunna. Lieutenant General Huang Shiyue led the group. Among the group were important professors such as Wen Yiduo, Huang Yusheng, Yuan Fuli, Li Jitong, Zeng Zhaolun, and Wu Zhengyi. The group was equipped with two trucks for carrying their luggage and supplies, along with their own cooks and medical staff.

The teachers and students started from Jiucaiyuan in Changsha, marched along the Zhongshan Road, took a boat along the Xiangjiang River to Changde, then walked through Guzhang County and Huayuan County in western Hunan to Huangguoshu in Guizhou, continued west to Zhanyi in Yunnan, and finally arrived in Kunming. They walked 30 to 40 km a day, spending the night in temples, monasteries, farmers' shanties or even out in the open. Huang Shiyue often encouraged the students to inherit and carry forward the spirit of the May Fourth Movement. He reminded them to wear leg wraps when walking, wash their feet with cold water after walking, and drink a glass of boiled water before breakfast so that they would not feel thirsty all day. Along the way, he treated the students with great care and respect, and was well respected by them. Bandits were numerous in western Hunan, making the journey unsafe. Zhang Zhizhong arranged for the Xiangxi-born writer Shen Congwen to negotiate with various factions there, ultimately refraining from harassing the teachers and students.

On April 28, after an arduous journey, the teachers and students arrived in Kunming. It took 68 days and a journey of more than 3,500 li (Chinese miles). The teachers and students treated the migration as a teaching assignment, actively promoting anti-Japanese and national salvation efforts while also diligently learning and practicing. General Huang Shiyue was also able to take the lead in finding fellow Miao people, allowing students to have direct contact with them and hold a get-together. The troops passed through Kunming City and arrived at Yuantong Park on the north side. General Huang Shiyue said to President Mei Yiqi: "I took more than 200 people from you in Changsha. Now I return them to you. According to the list, all of them are here." No one in the entire travel group was injured or killed.

== 1938 letter ==
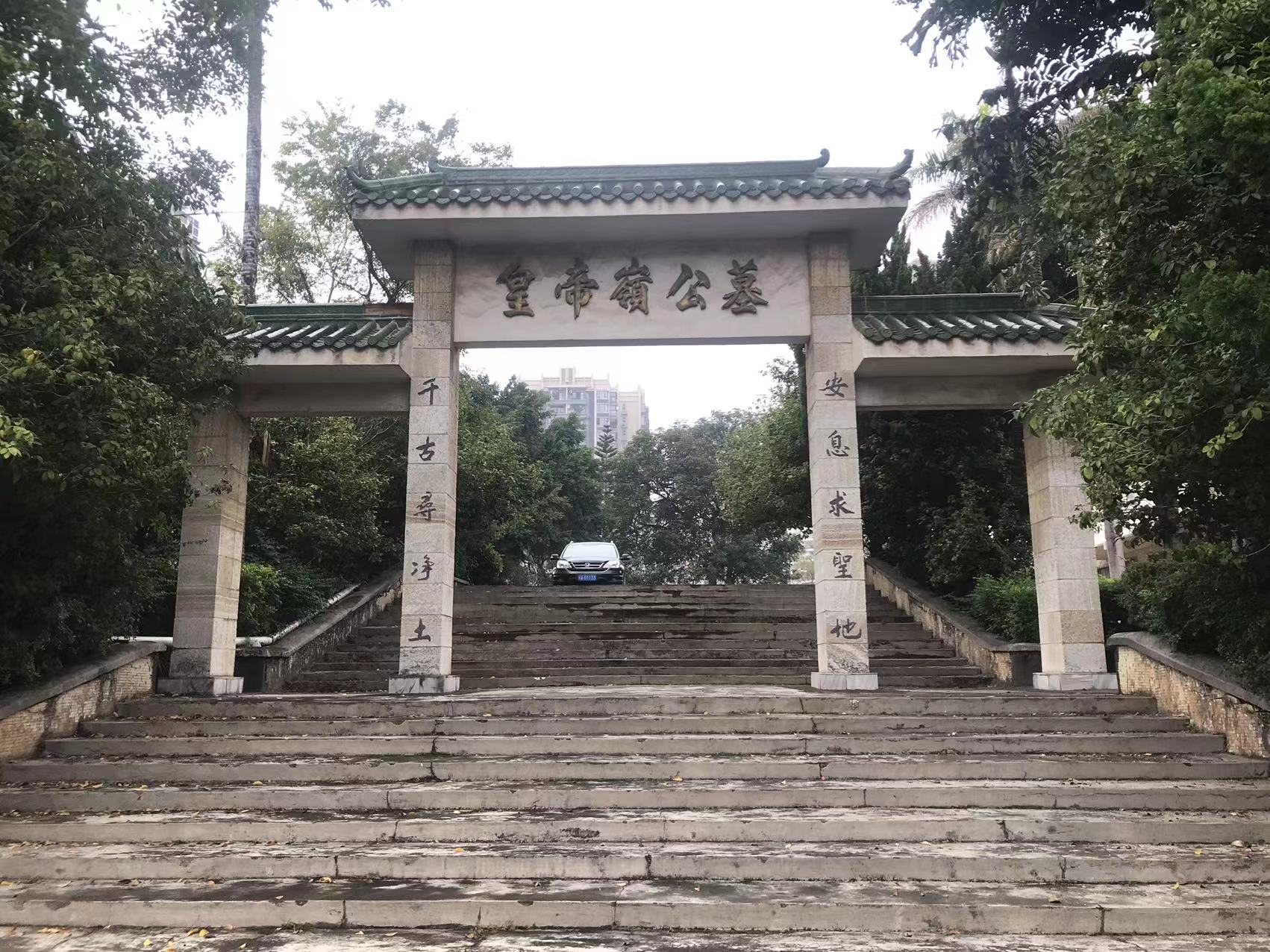
The place where Lieutenant General Huang Shiyue was buried

The following is a brief English translation of a letter from Huang Shiyue to Presidents Jiang Menglin and Mei Yiqi of the National Associated University, written on June 2, 1938.

Dear Presidents Jiang and Mei:

The enemy threat is still raging. We must resolutely resist the Japanese invasion. For the great cause of national rejuvenation, relocating cultural resources to the rear and preserving them for future use is the most urgent task of our time. I was merely following the orders of Chairman Zhang Wenbai to lead a group of students from your university on foot to Yunnan to begin classes. Although the journey was arduous, I felt a sense of spiritual joy and honor in serving the nation and the country, traveling 3,000 miles with hundreds of young people. I felt a sense of shame at the hospitality and comfort I received in Yunnan. I will treasure the commemorative book you gave me and keep it forever as a commemoration of this trip. As for your donation of a gold watch and 500 yuan travelling expenses, they were sincere gestures. I truly had no choice but to hand them to the sender to take back. I have returned to Changsha on June 1 to report back. I am writing to convey my best wishes to you.

From Huang Shiye, June 2, 1938

== See also ==
- National Changsha Provisional University
- National Southwestern Associated University
- Zhang Zhizhong
