= Chang Ming-che =

Taiwanese academic

- 張明哲

President of National Tsinghua University
- In office 1975–1981
- Preceded by: Shu Shien-Siu
- Succeeded by: Mao Kao-wen

Minister of National Science Council
- In office March 1981 – 31 May 1984
- Preceded by: Shu Shien-Siu
- Succeeded by: Chen Li-an

Personal details
- Born: 6 May 1914 Hanchuan, Heibei
- Died: 31 July 1998 (aged 84) United States
- Education: National Tsing Hua University (BS); Massachusetts Institute of Technology (MS)

Chang Ming-che (Chinese: 張明哲; 6 May 1914 – 31 July 1998) was a Taiwanese academic.
