= National Tsing Hua University =

University in Hsinchu City, Taiwan

- 國立清華大學
- Former names: Tsinghua College (1911–1928)
- Motto: 自強不息 厚德載物
- Motto in English: Constantly strengthen and cultivate ourselves
- Type: Public research university
- Established: April 11, 1911 in Beijing; 1956 in Hsinchu, Taiwan
- Parent institution: Ministry of Education
- Affiliations: Harvard-Yenching Institute, AACSB, APRU, AEARU; University System of Taiwan; Tsinghua Big Five Alliance UAiTED, Alliance of Chinese and European Business Schools
- Endowment: NTD 35.3 billion (2022) (US$1.16 billion)
- President: W. John Kao
- Faculty: 1,355
- Undergraduates: 9,120
- Postgraduates: 9,005
- Location: Hsinchu, Taiwan; 24°47′37″N 120°59′34″E
- Campus: Suburban, 1.20 square kilometres (300 acres)
- Language: Mandarin, English
- Flower: Redbud and Chinese plum blossom
- Mascot: Giant panda
- Website: nthu.edu.tw

Chinese name
- Simplified Chinese: 国立清华大学
- Traditional Chinese: 國立清華大學
Transcriptions
Standard Mandarin
- Hanyu Pinyin: Guólì Qīnghuá Dàxué
- Wade–Giles: Kuo-li Ch'ing-hua Ta-hsuëh
- Tongyong Pinyin: Guólì Cinghuá Dàsyué
Southern Min
- Hokkien POJ: Kok-li̍p Chheng-hôa Tāi-ha̍k

National Tsing Hua University (NTHU) is a national public research university in Hsinchu, Taiwan. Founded in Peking in 1911, it was re-established in Taiwan in 1956 following the Chinese Civil War.

The university is organized into twelve colleges, 26 departments, and 31 research institutes which collectively enroll more than 9,000 undergraduates and 9,000 graduate students. Its suburban campus neighbors the Hsinchu Science Park, a leading technology hub. As a member of the University System of Taiwan, it is affiliated with National Yang Ming Chiao Tung University, National Central University and National Chengchi University.

The university's alumni include Nobel Prize laureates Yang Chen-Ning, Tsung-Dao Lee, and Yuan T. Lee.

== History ==
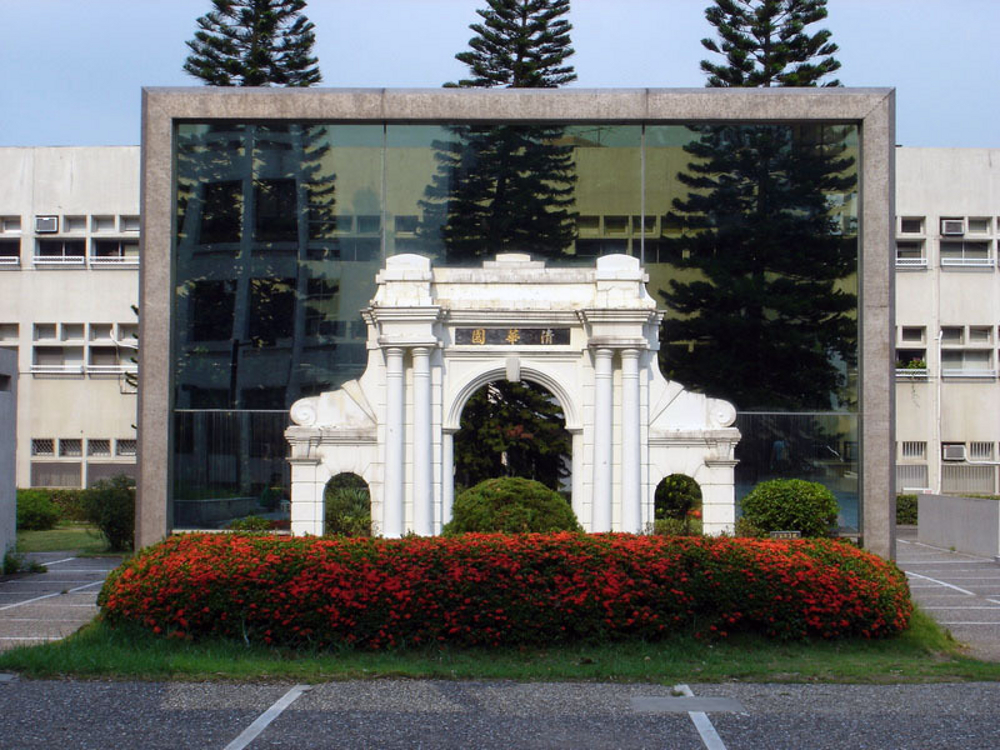
Replica of the Old Gate in Beijing, symbol of Tsinghua University

=== Founding ===
After U.S. Secretary of State John Hay suggested that the US$30 million Boxer Indemnity paid to the United States from China was excessive, U.S. president Theodore Roosevelt and U.S. Congress reduced the Qing indemnity by US$10.8 million on the condition that the funding be used as scholarships for Chinese students to study at American universities. Under this fund, Tsinghua College (Chinese: 清華學堂; pinyin: Qīnghuá Xuétáng) was established in Beijing on 22 April 1911 on the site of a former royal garden belonging to a prince. It was initially a preparatory school for students intending to pursue studies in the U.S. on government scholarships. The faculty members for the sciences were recruited by the YMCA from the United States and its graduates transferred directly to American schools as juniors upon graduation. In 1925, the school established its College Department and started its research institute on Chinese Study.

=== War years ===
In 1928, the authority officially changed its name to National Tsing Hua University (NTHU). During the Second World War in 1937, Tsinghua University, Peking University, and Nankai University merged to form National Changsha Temporary University in Changsha, and later National Southwestern Associated University in Kunming. After the war, Tsinghua moved back to Beijing and resumed its operation there.

During the Sino-Japanese War, the library lost 200,000 volumes, out of a total of 350,000.

=== Relocation to Taiwan ===
In 1956, National Tsing Hua University (NTHU) was reinstalled on its current campus in Hsinchu, Taiwan. Since its reinstallation, NTHU has developed from an institute focusing on Nuclear Science and Technology to that of a comprehensive research university offering degrees programs ranging from baccalaureate to doctorate in science, technology, engineering, humanities and social sciences, as well as management. Successful alumni, including two Nobel laureates in physics (Dr. Chen-Ning Yang and Tsung-Dao Lee), one Nobel laureate in chemistry (Dr. Yuan-Tseh Lee) and one Wolf Prize winner in mathematics (Dr. Shiing-Shen Chern) came from this school.

=== Recent history ===
In recent decades, the National Tsing Hua University in Taiwan has had increasingly close ties with the Tsinghua University in People's Republic of China (China). Of all universities on Taiwan, the NTHU has arguably one of the strongest cooperations with universities in mainland China in academic research, projects, and with the creation of programs such as the "Center for Contemporary China".

The first astronomical satellite by Taiwan's space agency (TASA) is developed by NTHU and Academia Sinica. It is called The Gamma-ray Transients Monitor and is a cubesat with the goal of tracking Gamma Ray Bursts (GRBs) and other bright gamma-ray transients with energies ranging from 50 keV to 2 MeV. It will be deployed to orbit by Falcon 9 in Q4 2026.

In 2016, National Hsinchu University of Education (NHCUE) merged into NTHU to form the NTHU Nanda Campus on Nanda Road in East District, Hsinchu City.

== Tradition ==
=== Meichu Tournament ===
The Mei-Chu Tournament, held in March annually, is a sport competition between National Tsing Hua University and National Yang Ming Chiao Tung University. Since its establishment in 1969, the tournament, also known as the Mei-Chu Games, has become a tradition, and is considered one of the most important activities between these two prestigious universities in Taiwan.

The history of the Meichu Games goes back to the 1960s. After the end of the Chinese Civil War in 1949, National Tsing Hua University and National Yang Ming Chiao Tung University were both relocated in Hsinchu, Taiwan and became neighbors. The geographic and academic closeness prompted many intellectual and social exchanges between two universities.

In 1966, an informal tournament was held. The arrangement of the formal event, however, was not institutionalized until 1968, when Chian Feng, an executive officer of NTHU student activity center, received the permission from the university authority to plan sport events for NTHU and NCTU students modeling after the Oxford and Cambridge Boat Race.

While both side agreed on the plan to hold such an annual event, there was a disagreement on the naming of the Games. At last, Zhang Zhi-yi solved this problem by proposing the conventional coin tossing. "If the head-side is up, the game would be called Mei-Chu; otherwise, the game would be called Chu-Mei." As the head-side of the coin went up, the tournament was thereby named Meichu to commemorate the two founding presidents of NTHU and NCTU, Mei Yi-chi and Ling Chu-Ming.

== Rankings ==
University rankings

Global – Overall
- ARWU World: 401–500 (2025)
- QS World: 176 (2026)
- THE World: 401–500 (2025)
- USNWR Global: 506 (2025)

Regional – Overall
- QS Asia: 39 (2025)
- THE Asia: 71 (2024)

NTHU is generally considered to be one of the best universities in Taiwan.

In 2014, the Japan–Taiwan Exchange Association listed NTHU as one of the seven well-known Taiwanese universities.

In 2021, Times Higher Education ranked National Tsing Hua University 351-400th in the world. The 2021 QS World University Rankings ranked National Tsing Hua University 168th overall. In 2021, U.S. News & World Report ranked National Tsing Hua University 363rd in the world. In 2020, Academic Ranking of World Universities ranked National Tsing Hua University 401-500th.

The 2020 QS World University Rankings by Subject ranked the university: 84th in Engineering & Technology, 266th in Arts & Humanities, 401-500th in Life Sciences & Medicine, 101st in Natural Sciences, and 249th in Social Sciences & Management

== Academics ==
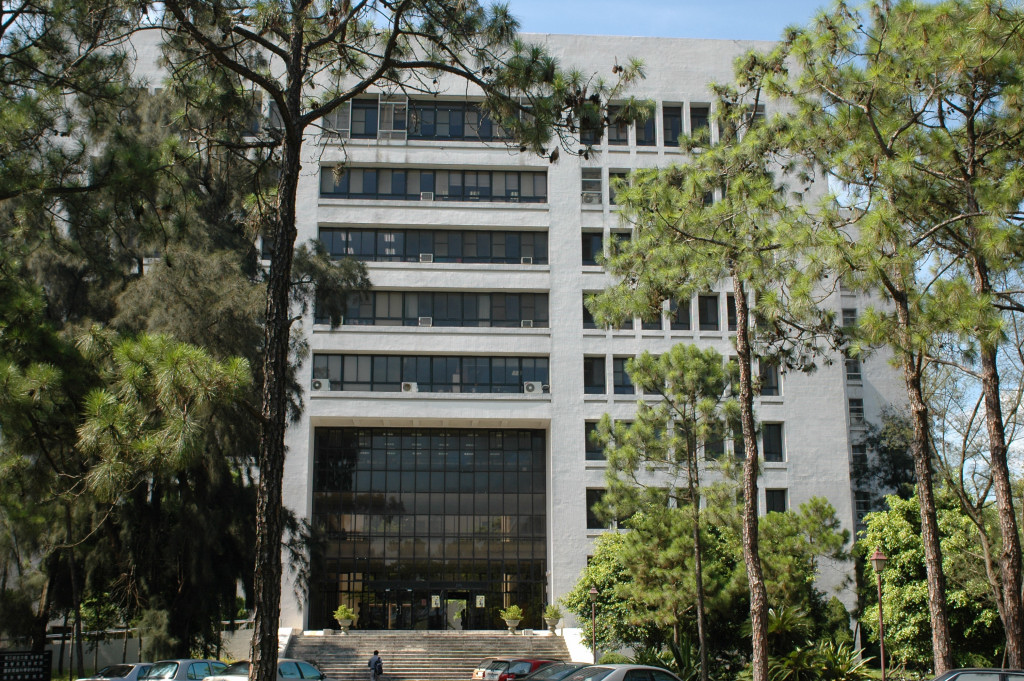
General Building III on NTHU's Main Campus

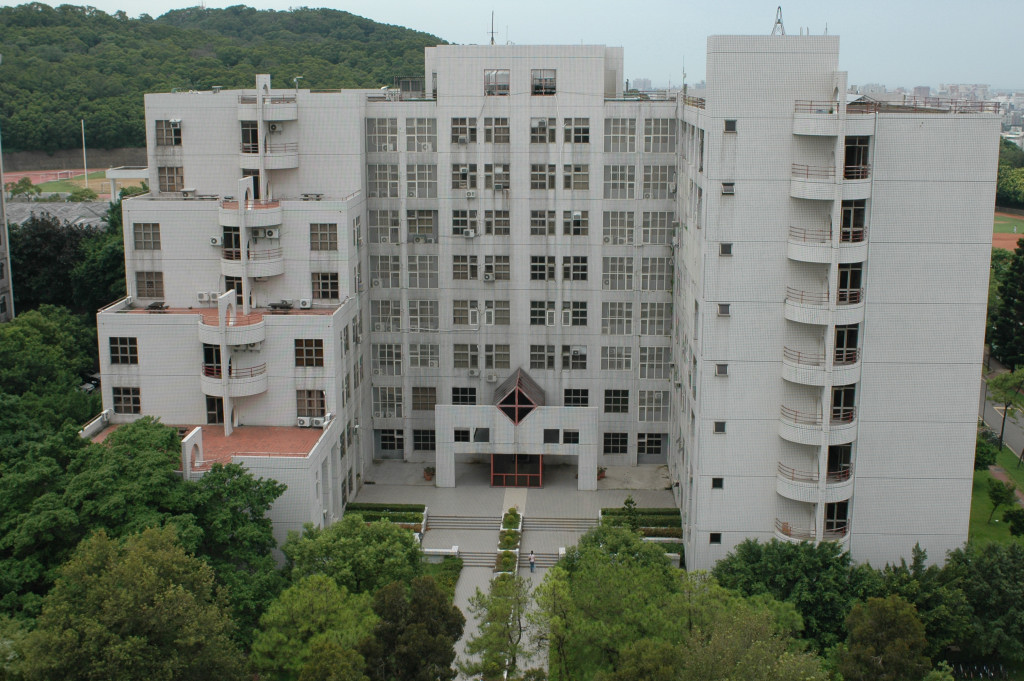
Electrical Engineering and Computer Science Building on the shore of Kunming Lake

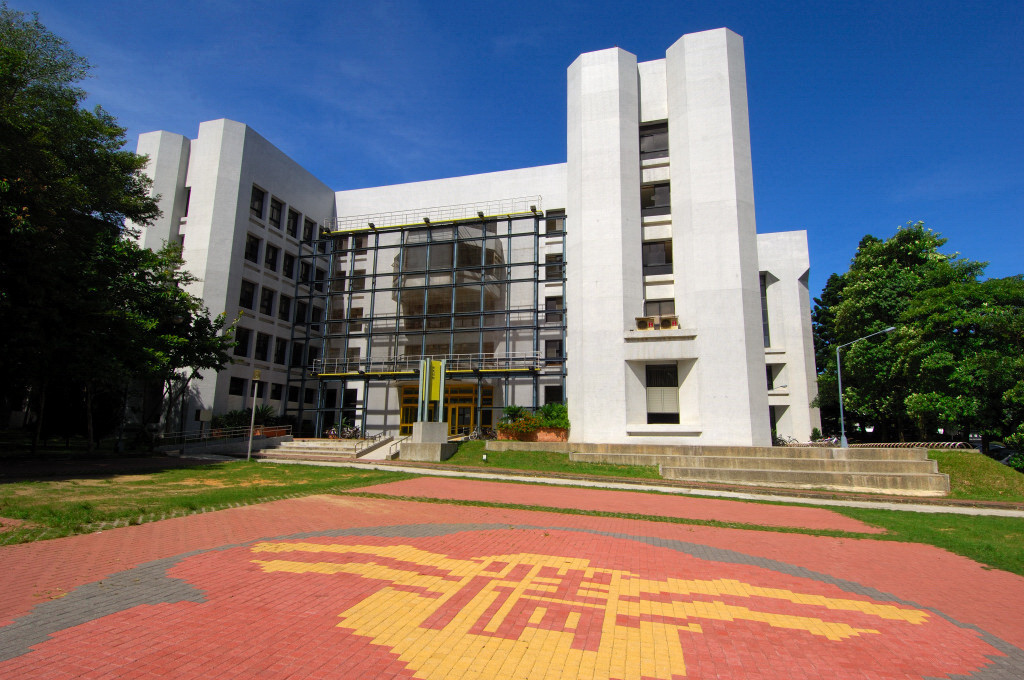
Mong Man-Wai Building for student clubs and extracurricular activities

- College of Science
  - Interdisciplinary program of Sciences
  - Department of Physics
  - Department of Mathematics
  - Department of Chemistry
  - Institute of Statistics
  - Institute of Astronomy
  - Institute of Computational and Modeling Science
- College of Engineering
  - Interdisciplinary Program of Engineering
  - Department of Chemical Engineering
  - Department of Materials Science and Engineering
  - Department of Power Mechanical Engineering
  - Department of Industrial Engineering and Engineering Management
  - Institute of Nano Engineering and MicroSystems
  - Institute of Biomedical Engineering
  - Institute of Space Engineering
  - International Graduate Program
  - Graduate Molecular Engineering Program
  - Graduate Program of Advanced Energy
  - IEEM Professional Master's Program
  - Dual Master Program for Global Operation Management
- College of Electrical Engineering and Computer Science
  - Interdisciplinary Program of Electrical Engineering and Computer Science
  - Department of Electrical Engineering
  - Department of Computer science
  - Institute of Electronics Engineering
  - Institute of Communications Engineering
  - Institute of Photonics Technologies
  - Institute of Information Systems and Applications
  - Institute of Information Security
- College of Life Sciences and Medicine
  - School of Medicine
  - Interdisciplinary Program of Life Science
  - Department of Life Science
  - Department of Medical Science
  - Institute of System Neuroscience
  - Institute of Biotechnology
  - Institute of Molecular Medicine
  - Institute of Molecular and Cellular Biology
  - Institute of Bioinformatics and Structural Biology
- College of Humanities and Social Sciences
  - Interdisciplinary Program of Humanities and Social Sciences
  - Department of Chinese Literature
  - Department of Foreign Languages and Literature
  - Institute of Anthropology
  - Institute of History
  - Institute of Philosophy
  - Institute of Sociology
  - Institute of Linguistics
  - Institute of Taiwan Literature
  - Institute of Sinophone Studies
  - Graduate Program on Taiwan Studies
  - International Master's Program in Inter-Asia Cultural Studies
- College of Nuclear Science
  - Interdisciplinary Program of Nuclear Science
  - Department of Engineering and System Science
  - Department of Biomedical Engineering and Environmental Sciences
  - Institute of Nuclear Engineering and Science
  - Institute of Analytical and Environmental Sciences
- College of Technology Management
  - Interdisciplinary Program of Management and Technology
  - Department of Economics
  - Department of Quantitative Finance
  - Institute of Technology Management
  - Institute of Law for Science and Technology
  - Institute of Service Science
  - EMBA
  - IMBA
- College of Education
  - Interdisciplinary Program of Education
  - Department of Education and Learning Technology
  - Department of Kinesiology
  - Department of Early Childhood Education
  - Department of Special Education
  - Department of English Instruction
  - Department of Educational Psychology and Counseling
  - Department of Environmental and Cultural Resources
  - Institute of Human Resource Development
  - Institute of Taiwan Languages and Language Teaching
  - Institute of Learning Sciences and Technologies
  - Institute of Mathematics and Science Education
- College of Arts
  - Interdisciplinary Program of Technology and Art
  - Department of Music
  - Department of Arts and Design
  - Institute of Art and Technology
- College of Semiconductor Research
- Taipei School of Economics and Political Science (TSE)
  - M.A. Program in Asian Political Economy
  - M.A. Program in Global Political Economy and Asia
- Tsing Hua College
  - Tsing Hua Interdisciplinary Program
  - Tsing Hua College International bachelor's degree Program
  - Residential College
  - Center for General Education
  - Center for Teacher Education
  - Center for Language Education
  - Research Center for Technology and Art
  - Regional Innovation Center
  - Arts Center
  - Military Instructors' Office
  - Physical Education Office
- Research Centers
  - Research & Development Office
  - Computer & Communication Research Center
  - National Center for Theoretical Sciences
  - IC Design Tech. Center
  - Center for Science Technology and Society
  - Center for Nanotechology, Materials Science, and Microsystems
  - Center for Photonics Research
  - NTHU/ITRI Joint Research Center
  - Center for Contemporary China
  - Center for Energy and Environmental Research
  - Brain Research Center
  - Laboratory Animal Room
  - Instrument Center
  - Nuclear Science and Technology Development Center
  - Electronic Business Center
  - Quality Research Center
  - Advanced Packaging Research Center
  - Bioinformatics Center
- University alliances
  - NTHU is affiliated with National Yang Ming Chiao Tung University, National Central University and National Chengchi University as part of the University System of Taiwan (UST).
  - This university is a member of University Academic Alliance in Taiwan (UAAT). The members include twelve universities such as National Taiwan University, National Taiwan Normal University, National Yang Ming Chiao Tung University, National Sun Yat-sen University, National Cheng Kung University, National Taiwan University of Science and Technology, and National Chengchi University.
  - NTHU is a founding member of Taiwan-UK University Consortium. The members include National Taiwan University, National Taiwan Normal University, National Sun Yat-sen University, University of Edinburgh, University of Liverpool, Newcastle University, and University of the West of Scotland.

== International programs ==
NTHU participates in the Bioinformatics Program of the Taiwan International Graduate Program of Academia Sinica, Taiwan's prestigious academic research institution.

== Campus life ==
=== Student clubs ===
There are more than one hundred student clubs serving diverse interests. Club activities range from community services, music and sports, cinema and theater, dancing and martial arts, religion and philosophy as well as scientific and academic interests.

=== Housing ===
There are eighteen dormitories on campus accommodating about 5000 students. Freshman, sophomore and most of the graduate students are allowed to lodge at dorms without drawing lots. The majority of NTHU faculty members are also living on campus.

=== Scholarships, fellowships, and financial aid ===
Scholarships and fellowships are awarded on a meritorious basis. Annually more than six hundred undergraduates and one hundred graduate students receive such supports. In addition, around four thousand graduate students are supported with teaching or research assistantships from academic units. For students with financial difficulties, the university provides student loans and emergency funds.

=== Health care and counseling services ===
A University Clinic, affiliated with Hsinchu Mackay Memorial Hospital, is located on campus where first aid and general medical services are provided.

The NTHU offers counseling service to students, faculty and staff members at the University Counseling Center. The clinic and the center not only provide services when needed and organize and present educational programs for all students.

== Presidents ==
- Mei Yi-chi: 1956–1962
- Chen Ke-Chung: 1962–1969
- Yen Chen-hsing: 1969–1970
- Shu Shien-Siu: 1970–1975
- Chang Ming-che: 1975–1981
- Mao Gao-wen: 1981–1987
- Liu Chao-shiuan: 1987–1993
- R. C. T. Lee: 1993–1994
- Shen Chun-shan: 1994–1997
- Chen Hsin-hsiung: 1997–1998
- Chung Laung Liu: February 1998 – February 2002
- Frank Shu: February 2002 – February 2006
- Wen-Tsuen Chen: February 2006 – February 2010
- Lih-Juann Chen: February 2010 – February 2014
- HoCheng Hong: February 2014 – February 2022
- W. John Kao: February 2022 – present

== Notable alumni and faculty ==
=== Humanities and Social Sciences ===
- David Zweig: social scientist

=== Physical Science & Engineering ===
- Ta-You Wu: physicist, the former president of Academia Sinica, the Republic of China (Taiwan)
- Yu-Fen Zhao: CAS academician, Tsinghua University, Beijing, Xiamen University, a professor of chemistry
- Chen Ning Yang: winner of the Nobel Prize in Physics, Academia Sinica academician
- Tsung-Dao Lee: winner of the Nobel Prize in Physics, Academia Sinica academician
- Yuan Tseh Lee: winner of the Nobel Prize in Chemistry, Academician of Academia Sinica, the former president of Academia Sinica, the Republic of China
- H. T. Kung: Harvard University Professor of Computer Science, National Academy of Engineering USA
- Typhoon Lee: Academia Sinica, director of the Institute of Earth Sciences, Academia Sinica academicians
- Way Kuo: President of City University of Hong Kong, former Bell Labs expert, Academician of Academia Sinica,
- Wei Shyy: President, Hong Kong University of Science & Technology, China
- Wen-Tsuen Chen: former president of NTHU, Taiwan
- Nancy Tang Chang: co-founder of the U.S. biotech company Tanox, chairman, president
- Fa-Yueh Wu: mathematician and physicist, Professor of Northeastern University

== See also ==
- List of universities in Taiwan
  - List of schools in the Republic of China reopened in Taiwan
- Hsinchu Science Park
- National Experimental High School: A "Kindergarten through High School", established to provide special education opportunity to staff and faculty of NTHU and other Greater Science Park Area personnel.
- Academia Sinica
- Tsinghua Big Five Alliance
- Tsinghua University
