= Plum blossom (disambiguation) =

Plum blossom (Prunus mume) is an East Asian flowering tree species.

Plum blossom may also refer to:

- Plum Blossom (film), 2000 South Korean coming-of-age film
- The Plum Blossom, a patriotic song of the Republic of China (Taiwan) written in 1976
- The Plum Blossoms, 1948 painting by Henri Matisse

== See also ==
- Plum (disambiguation)
- Chinese plum (disambiguation)
- Japanese plum (disambiguation)
