= NTHU College of Electrical Engineering and Computer Science =

The College of Electrical Engineering and Computer Science (EECS) of National Tsing Hua University was established on February 1, 1998. The goal of the college is to foster high-tech professionals to be ready to meet the trend in national economic construction and industrial development. Many alumni now work in Hsinchu Science Park, the technological heart of Taiwan.

The college of EECS now consists of two departments and four graduate institutes:

- Department of Electrical Engineering (EE), Ph.D., M.S. and B.S.
- Department of Computer Science (CS), Ph.D., M.S. and B.S.
- Institute of Electronics Engineering (ENE), Ph.D. and M.S.
- Institute of Communications Engineering (COM), Ph.D. and M.S.
- Institute of Information Systems and Applications (ISA), Ph.D. and M.S.
- Institute of Photonics Technologies (IPT), Ph.D. and M.S.

Currently, the College of Electrical Engineering and Computer Science has 95 full-time faculty members.
