= W. John Kao =

Taiwanese polymer scientist and biomedical engineer (born 1968)

- 高為元
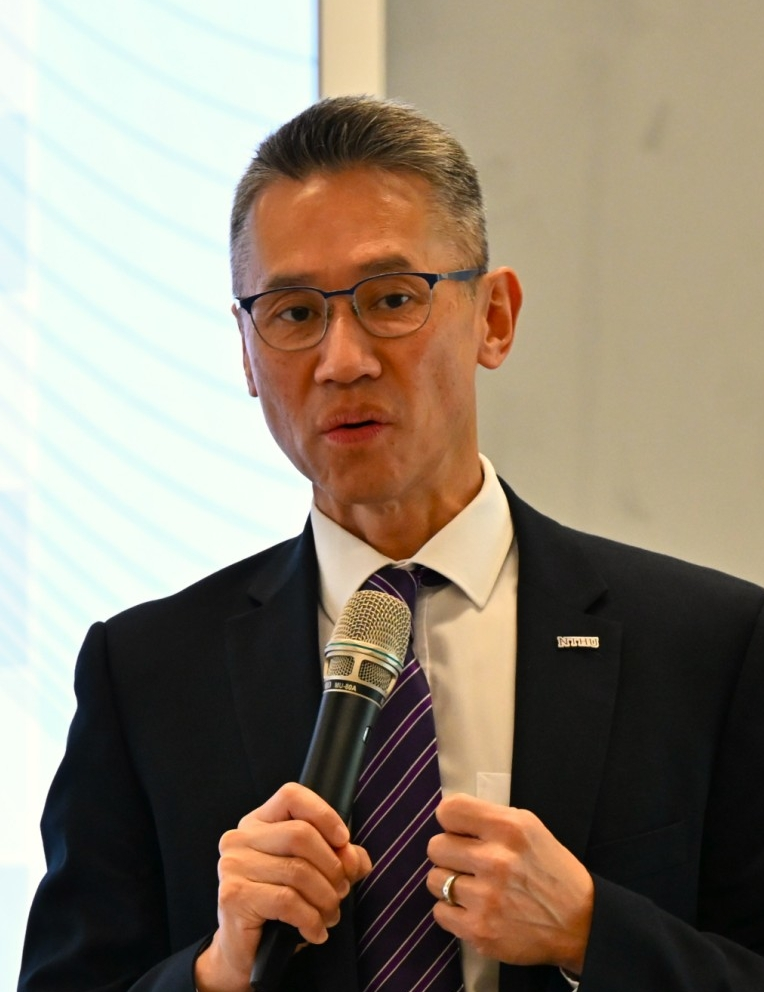
- Kao in 2022

President of National Tsing Hua University
- Incumbent
- Assumed office April 30, 2022
- Preceded by: Hocheng Hong

Personal details
- Born: October 13, 1968 (age 57) Taipei, Taiwan
- Education: Johns Hopkins University (BS, MS); Case Western Reserve University (PhD)
- Scientific career
- Fields: Polymer science
- Thesis: Biomechanisms of giant cell formation and leukocyte adhesion on polyurethanes (1996)
- Doctoral advisor: James M. Anderson; Anne Hiltner

Weiyuan John Edward Kao (Chinese: 高為元; pinyin: Gāo Wèiyuán; born October 13, 1968) is a Taiwanese polymer scientist and biomedical engineer who has been the president of National Tsing Hua University since 2022.

== Early life and education ==
Kao was born in Taipei, Taiwan, on October 13, 1968, and attended Taipei Dongmen Elementary School. After high school, he graduated from Johns Hopkins University with a Bachelor of Science (B.S.) in biomedical engineering in 1991 and a Master of Science (M.S.) in biomedical engineering. He then earned his Ph.D. in macromolecular science from Case Western Reserve University in 1996. His doctoral dissertation, completed under biologist James M. Anderson and polymer scientist Anne Hiltner, was titled, "Biomechanisms of giant cell formation and leukocyte adhesion on polyurethanes".

== Academic career ==
After receiving his doctorate, Kao completed postdoctoral research at the California Institute of Technology in chemistry and chemical engineering and at ETH Zurich in materials science and engineering. In 1998, he joined the faculty of the University of Wisconsin–Madison, where he became the deputy head of the department of biomedical engineering from 2010 to 2011 and, in 2012, a Vilas Distinguished Service Professor, one of the university's highest positions.

In 2015, at the invitation of Peter Mathieson, Kao became the vice president of the University of Hong Kong. In 2019, he became the Chair Professor of Translational Medicine Engineering at the University of Hong Kong and concurrently served as the director of the Translational Research Institute of the Hong Kong Science and Technology Parks Corporation.

=== President of National Tsing Hua University (2022–) ===
On November 6, 2021, National Tsing Hua University announced that Kao had been selected as the university's next president. He was sworn in as president on April 30, 2022. Kao was a finalist for the position of chancellor at the University of Hawaii at Manoa in May 2026, shortly after beginning his second term as NTHU president. After facing criticism from the university community, Kao pledged to donate his monthly salary each May for the remainder of his term to a fund for dormitory maintenance.
