= Chiang Ching-kuo Foundation =

Republic of China non-profit organization

Chiang Ching-kuo Foundation for Scholarly Exchange
- Founded: 1989
- Purpose: Sinology
- Location(s): Taipei, Taiwan; McLean, Virginia, United states
- Region served: Global
- Method: Donations and grants
- Key people: Fredrick Chien, Chair; Vacant, President
- Endowment: US$86 Million
- Website: www.cckf.org.tw

The Chiang Ching-kuo Foundation for International Scholarly Exchange (CCKF; Chinese: 蔣經國國際學術交流基金會) is a private nonprofit organization located in Taipei, Taiwan, that provides support for research grants on Chinese studies in the humanities and social sciences at overseas institutions. It was founded in 1989 and named after Chiang Ching-kuo, the late President of the Republic of China from 1972 to 1988. The foundation also has a regional office in McLean, Virginia in the United States.

== History ==
The Chiang Ching-kuo Foundation for International Scholarly Exchange was formally established on January 12, 1989, being supported by both the ROC government and private organizations, while also earning distinction as Taiwan's first international academic organization. The stated motivation for the foundation stems from professors of Chinese descent at American universities becoming concerned about the decline of programs of Chinese studies at colleges and universities overseas, and their desire to reverse this situation. Chiang Ching-kuo is said to have favored creation of the foundation, and it was created as a living memorial to him. The foundation was patterned after the Fulbright Program in the United States.

The foundation's original endowment was US$86 million, consisting of $53 million from the Republic of China Ministry of Education and $33 million from private donors. The foundation then operates using the interest generated from this endowment, which as of 2004 was $3.4 million for a year. The foundation is governed by a board, consisting of prominent government officials, academics, people in industry, and assorted other citizens. As of 2011, the board had 19 members; its chair was Mao Kao-wen, and notable members included former Taiwan Province governor James Soong, Morris Chang of Taiwan Semiconductor Manufacturing Corporation, former Chinese University of Hong Kong Vice-Chancellor Lawrence Lau, and former Minister of Foreign Affairs Fredrick Chien. The Ministry of Education continues to have a strong voice in foundation decisions.

The foundation's principal goals are to foster the overseas study of Chinese culture and society, to support international scholarly exchange, to promote widespread attention to and understanding of Taiwan, and to promote academic dialogue on global issues. The foundation organizes its grants by four geographical areas: North America, Europe, Asia-Pacific, and domestic (Taiwan, Hong Kong, and Macao); historically, most of its activity has been with those in the United States.

In its first seven years of operation, the foundation spent $23 million on American scholarship. By 2001, many Western academics who were specialists in China were getting research funds from the foundation. By 2004, the foundation had supported nearly 2,000 projects overall.

The Chiang Ching-kuo Foundation provides research grants, fellowship grants, grants for conferences, seminars, and workshops, publication subsidies, doctoral fellowships (including for Taiwanese students abroad), and travel grants and visiting fellowships. In some cases, research that focuses on Taiwan's recent social, cultural, economic, or political development is encouraged, as are collaborative projects with scholars in Taiwan.

Grants from the foundation have sometimes proven controversial. In 1996, the University of California, Berkeley was offered $3 million for a new center to study ancient Chinese cultures, but the offer was dependent upon the university commemorating both the foundation and Chiang Ching-kuo. This brought about opposition to the proposed funding by students and scholars who objected to the history of political repression during the earlier years of Chiang's regime. They thought it would damage Berkeley's reputation and put Berkeley under undue control by the foundation, and who feared it would harm the university's research and exchange student dealings with the People's Republic of China. The director of the US office of the foundation said in response that political aspects are not a factor in the foundation's funding decisions. The university decided to name the program, but not the center, after Chiang and the foundation, causing the foundation to suspend the offer.

In the end, two centers for Sinological research were set up: The Chiang Ching-kuo International Sinological Center at Charles University (CCK-ISC) was established in 1997 at Charles University in Prague, and the Chiang Ching-kuo Center for Chinese Cultural and Institutional History was established in 1999 in conjunction with the Department of East Asian Languages and Cultures at Columbia University in New York.

Political complexities have also extended to scholars working in the People's Republic, who have worried that getting research funds from the foundation or other sources in Taiwan would lead to them being suspected as spying for or otherwise colluding with Taiwan.

== Chairmen ==
- Li Kwoh-ting (1989 – ???)
- Yu Kuo-hwa (??? – 2001)
- Li Yih-yuan (2001 – 2010)
- Mao Kao-wen (2010 – 2019)
- Fredrick Chien (2019 – Present)

== Presidents ==
- Li Yih-yuan (1989 – 2003)
- Chu Yun-han (2003 – 2023)

== See also ==
- Outline of sinology
- Taiwan studies
