= Zhao Yufen =

Chinese chemist

Zhao Yufen (simplified Chinese: 赵玉芬; traditional Chinese: 趙玉芬; pinyin: Zhào Yùfēn; born 1948) is a Chinese chemist at the college of chemistry and chemical engineering at Xiamen University. She has been an outspoken critic of chemical plants. She was the youngest female member elected to the Chinese Academy of Sciences.

== Biography ==
Zhao was born in Qi County, Hebi, Henan, and moved to Taiwan in 1949 with her parents. Zhao graduated from National Tsing Hua University (Taiwan) in 1971, and received her Ph.D from State University of New York at Stony Brook in 1975. In 1979, she went on to become a researcher at the Institute of Chemistry, Chinese Academy of Sciences. She became a professor at Tsinghua University (Beijing) in 1988 and in 1991, was elected to the Chinese Academy of Sciences, then the youngest female academician.

In March 2007, Zhao created a petition to halt the construction of a chemical plant in Xiamen. Zhao was against the plant, which was going to produce paraxylene (PX), a carcinogenic petrochemical, due to health risks and pollution of the environment. She said that "As a project with a high risk of poisonous emissions and explosions, the project should not be located close to a city." She also started writing letters to propose a relocation of the plant to He Lefeng, the Party chief of Xiamen. Months later, protesters used text messages to spread the word of a demonstration against the plant. Xiamen lawmakers voted overwhelmingly against the plant, which was located to Gulei Peninsula.

June 15, 2014, Zhao, as the head of the Academy Zhao Yufen of Xiamen University, along with BIOasis, signed on for the construction of a Phosphorus & Marine Science Research Center to be built at the Shandong International Biotechnology Park.

Zhao has work published in the Journal of the American Chemical Society, Journal of Organic Chemistry, Angewandte Chemie, Bioorganic & Medicinal Chemistry, Chemical Communications, Advanced Synthesis & Catalysis, and other journals.
