= National Tsing Hua University Nanda Campus =

Coordinates: 24°47′35″N 120°57′52″E

National Tsing Hua University Nanda Campus 國立清華大學南大校區
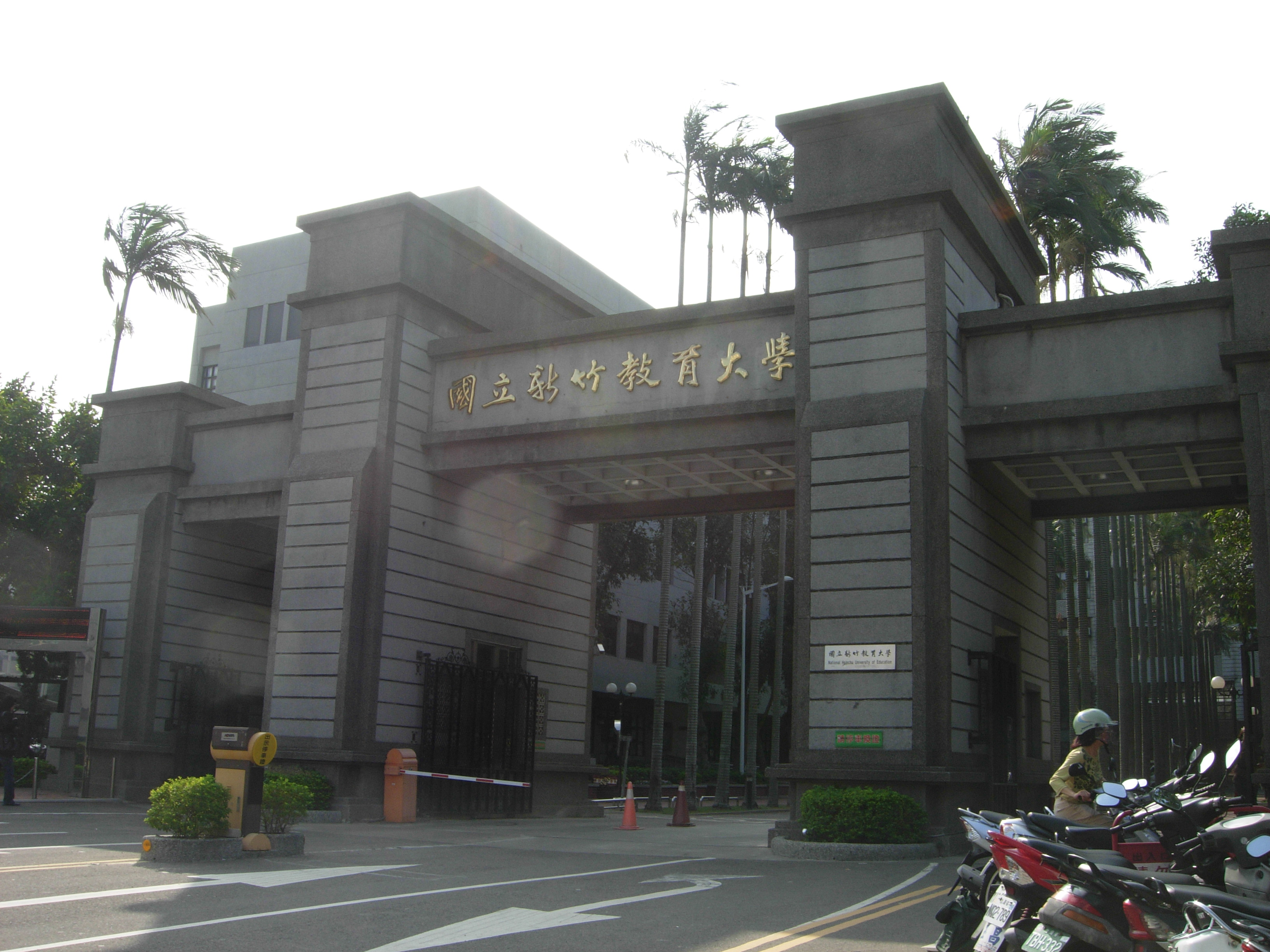
- Motto: 博雅弘達
- Established: April 1940; August 2005 (as National Hsinchu University of Education)
- President: Dr. Hwei-Pang Chen (陳惠邦)
- Location: East, Hsinchu City, Taiwan
- Website: Official website

National Tsing Hua University Nanda Campus
- Traditional Chinese: 國立清華大學南大校區
Transcriptions
Standard Mandarin
- Hanyu Pinyin: Guólì Xīnzhú Jiàoyù Dàxué

National Tsing Hua University Nanda Campus is a university campus on Nanda Road in East District, Hsinchu City, Taiwan of National Tsing Hua University.Nanda Campus, together with nearby Chengde High School, Hsinchu Elementary School, and Yuxian Junior High School, forms Hsinchu City's prominent Nanda educational and cultural district.

== History ==
NTHU Nanda Campus was originally established in April 1940 as a training institute for teachers of elementary, preschool and special education.

In August 2005, the institution was renamed the National Hsinchu University of Education（NHCUE）.

On 1 November 2016, the university was merged with National Tsing Hua University and become the Nanda Campus of it.

== Faculties ==
- College of Education
  - Department of Education and Learning Technology
  - Department of Physical Education
  - Department of Early Childhood Education
  - Department of Special Education
  - Department of Educational Psychology and Counseling
  - Graduate Institute of Human Resource Development
  - Graduate Institute of e-Learning Technology
- College of Humanities, Social Sciences and Arts
  - Department of Music
  - Department of Chinese Language and Literature
  - Department of English Instruction
  - Department of Arts and Design
  - Department of Environmental and Cultural Resources
  - Graduate Institute of Taiwan Languages and Language Education
- College of Science
  - Department of Applied Mathematics
  - Department of Applied Science
  - Graduate Institute of Computer Science
  - Graduate Institute of Mathematics and Science Education

== See also ==
- List of universities in Taiwan
