= Mary Zappone =

American businesswoman

Mary Slagle Zappone
- Born: July 15, 1964 (age 62)
- Education: Johns Hopkins University; Columbia Business School
- Spouse: John Zappone
- Children: 3
- Parents: James Robert Slagle; Frances Slagle

Mary Slagle Zappone (born July 15, 1964), daughter of James Robert Slagle, is an American businesswoman recognized for her expertise in business transformation and encouraging women in STEM. Zappone is a Senior Advisor at Warburg Pincus and sits on the Board of Directors of Axalta (NYSE: AXTA). Zappone has made her name as a prominent private equity CEO, most recently leading the Warburg Pincus-backed company Sundyne through its $2.16bn acquisition by Honeywell. She has held previous appointments as CEO and Director of a number of private equity backed industrial companies including Brace Industrial, Service Champ, and RecoverCare. Prior to her CEO engagements, Mary held roles at McKinsey & Company, Alcoa, Tyco International, General Electric, and ExxonMobil. She previously served on the Board of the Girl Scouts of San Jacinto, and continues to sit on the Advisory Board of the Johns Hopkins University's Whiting School of Engineering and the Advisory Board for McKinsey & Company's Advancing with Excellence in Advanced Industries Program.

== Education ==
Zappone received her Bachelor of Science in Chemical Engineering from Johns Hopkins University in 1986 and her MBA from Columbia Business School. Zappone attended high school at Eleanor Roosevelt High School in Maryland, a public magnet school renowned for its specialized Science and Technology program.

== CEO and board member roles ==
Zappone sits on the board of Axalta and FlavorSum, a Warbug Pincus portfolio company. She has held previous appointments on the Board of Directors of financial technology firm Blucora, in addition to CEO and Director roles at Sundyne (a Warburg Pincus portfolio combany), Brace Industrial (a Sterling Partners portfolio company), of ServiceChamp (a Snow Phipps portfolio company), and RecoverCare (an Aurora Capital portfolio company), prior to its merger with Joerns Healthcare in 2015.

== Writing ==
Zappone has written for industry-related publications such as Power Engineering International.

== Personal life ==
Mary married John Zappone, a Chemical Engineering classmate at Johns Hopkins University, in September 1986 while the two were pursuing MBA degrees at Columbia. The couple has three daughters who each pursued degrees in STEM – Frances (born 1992, now Frances Zappone Casella) and Sarah (born 1996, now Sarah Zappone Irikura) attended the Whiting School of Engineering at Johns Hopkins University while Anna (born 1994, now Anna Zappone Allaby) attended Stanford University. Zappone has brushed off questions regarding work life balance in interviews, once saying "it's just one big life," and has been cited to enjoy cooking, traveling and practicing yoga with her daughters.
