= David Zweig =

Canadian social scientist, academic, and author

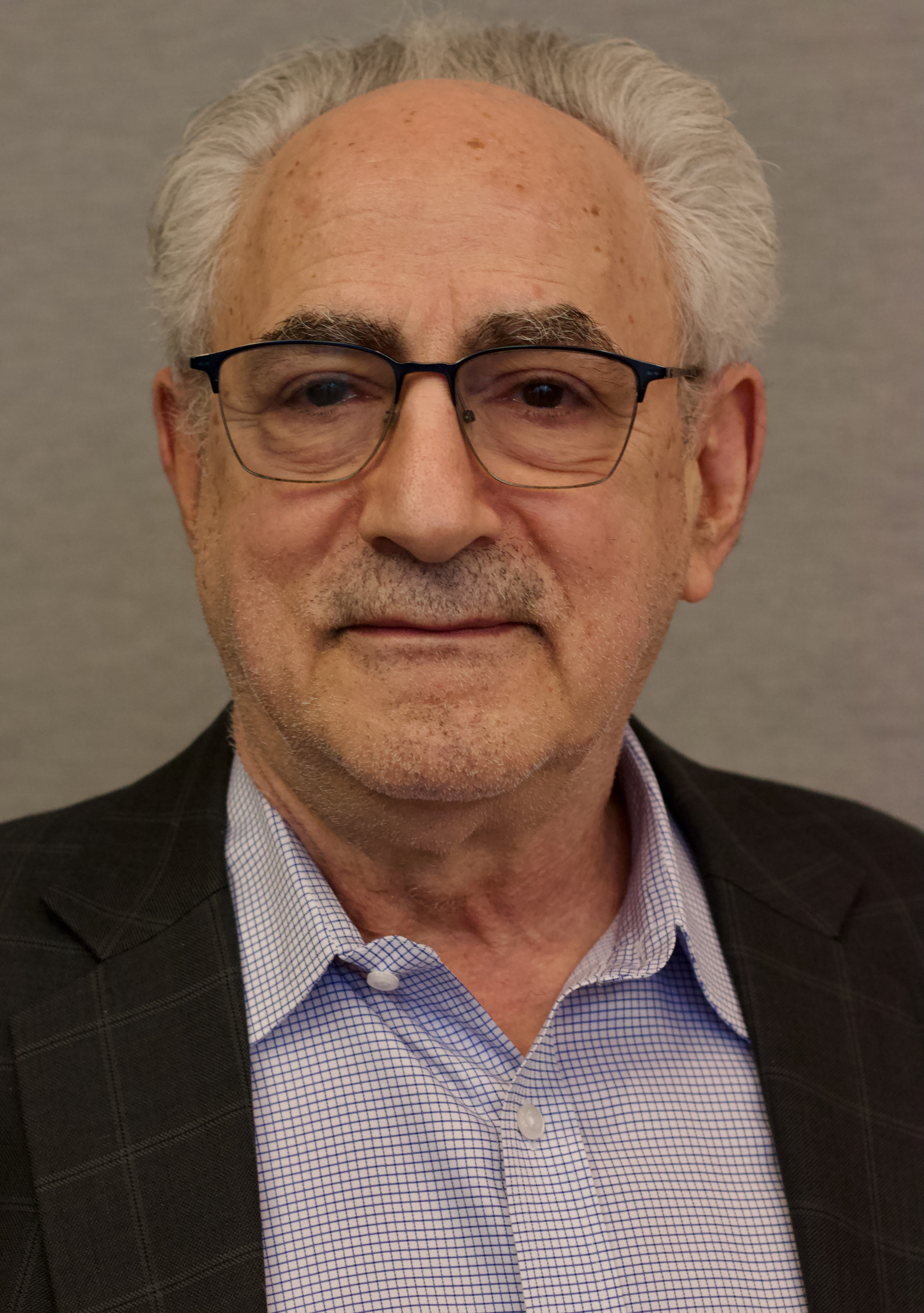
- Zweig in 2025
- Occupations: Social scientist, academic, and author

Academic background
- Education: BA (hons), MA, York University; PhD Political Science, The University of Michigan; Postdoctoral Fellowship, Harvard University
- Website: https://www.drdavidzweig.com

David Zweig is a Canadian social scientist, academic, and author. He is a Distinguished Visiting professor in the Taipei School of Economics and Political Science at National Tsing Hua University, and professor emeritus at the Hong Kong University of Science and Technology. He also served as a Vice President of the Center for China and Globalization.

Zweig has authored five books, including "The War for Chinese Talent in America: The Politics of Technology and Knowledge in Sino-American Relations," Internationalizing China: Domestic Interests and Global Linkages, China's Brain Drain to the United States, and Agrarian Radicalism in China, 1968–1981, and has edited seven books, including Globalization and China's Reforms, and Sino-U.S. Energy Triangles: Resource Diplomacy under Hegemony. His areas of expertise include China's talent migration, foreign economic policy, energy policy, resource diplomacy, returnees and new diaspora, and Hong Kong-Mainland Relations. He was the Founding Director, Center on China's Transnational Relations, HKUST, 2004–10 and directed it from 2004 to 2019.

Zweig was a Senior Fellow of the Asia Pacific Foundation of Canada (2013–15), a non-resident fellow of the Pacific Council on International Policy, 2006–2009, and President of the Hong Kong Political Science Association, 2008–10.

== Education ==
Zweig earned a Honours B.A. in political science in 1972 and an M.A. in political science in 1974 from York University in Toronto. He studied in Beijing between 1974 and 1976, earning a diploma in Mandarin Chinese from the Peking Languages Institute and a diploma in philosophy from Beijing University. He then earned a Ph.D. in political science from the University of Michigan in 1983 and was a postdoctoral fellow at Harvard University for a year.

== Career ==
Zweig began his academic career as an assistant professor of Political Science at Florida International University in Miami in 1982. Having held that position for two years, he briefly served as an assistant professor of Political Science at the University of Waterloo. In 1986, he was appointed an assistant professor in The Fletcher School at Tufts University and was promoted to an associate professor there in 1991. He moved to Hong Kong in 1996, held an appointment as an associate professor in the Division of Social Science at the Hong Kong University of Science and Technology from 1996 until 2002, and subsequently was appointed as a professor. From 2005 until 2019, he was Chair Professor at HKUST, and twice held concurrent appointments as Associate Dean of the School of Humanities and Social Science at HKUST (2006–08, 2011–13).

Zweig holds extensive professional experience in his field, and has consulted with many banks, investment firms, and governments. Between 2008 and 2012, he served as the emeritus President and President of the Hong Kong Political Science Association. He has two online courses about Chinese politics on Coursera where, as of 2023, he had taught over 41,000 students worldwide.

== Research ==
Zweig has authored numerous publications. For many years he was a Contributing Writer to the South China Morning Post in Hong Kong. His research works span the areas of Chinese politics, political risk, China's domestic and international political economy, its 'resource diplomacy,' reverse migration of diasporic talent (including India and Turkey), China's energy policy and Hong Kong-Mainland Relations.

=== China's talent migration ===
Zweig has conducted research on reverse migration in China and is most known for his investigations into China's efforts and strategies for reversing the brain drain and attracting and retaining high-quality talent from abroad. Zweig's main perspective is that by enhancing their human capital through their time abroad, and filling in the 'shortages' in science, technology, R&D and education in China, returnees can earn 'economic rents' in the domestic political economy and rewards from the state that wants their knowledge to enhance China's growth and development.

To assess this phenomenon, he has interviewed and surveyed mainlanders who have chosen to stay abroad and conducted a number of surveys of returnees since 1991–92 to advance our understanding of this issue. Focusing on efforts to mitigate the brain drain, he showed that domestic reforms and institutional change promote the reverse migration of high-level talent to China. One of his research studies illustrated that universities with a reformed institutional culture attracted more high-quality talent as compared to non-reformers.

In a highly cited paper, Can China bring back the best? The Communist Party organizes China's search for talent, he investigated the "1000 Talents" plan initiated by the Chinese Communist Party (CCP), finding that despite the CCP's best efforts, China faced great difficulties attracting back the best Chinese scientists and academics working abroad. He has also addressed the factors that influence Chinese students' decisions about going back to China. According to his research, technology transfer that can address China's technological and economic challenges, pulls returnees home, and the returnees who bring new technology to China gain from it. His research also outlined the various initiatives that have been launched at the national, provincial, and local governments, as well as research facilities. He directly tested whether the government or the market is a more powerful draw, and found that the latter is more influential for entrepreneurs. Furthermore, he concluded that, in comparison to their domestic counterparts, Chinese returnees—including academics and entrepreneurs with higher levels of education and skills—directly contribute more to China's economic and technological development.

More recently, Zweig drew attention to the contrast between returnee entrepreneurs' experiences in India and China in terms of perceptions, experiences, and state policies. He and his colleagues discovered that returning entrepreneurs in China showed more confidence and openness to cooperate with the local government.

=== China's transnational relations ===
While visiting southern Jiangsu Province in 1988, Zweig discovered that, unlike many counties in the province which were facing a critical shortage in the supply of fertilizer, Wujiang County had no such shortage. Why? Because they exported silk, for which they were paid in US dollars, they could import fertilizer from Japan. Zweig realized that Wujiang's 'transnational linkages' gave them comparative advantage vis a` vis other counties, delivering better economic growth than localities without such global ties. In 1991–92, Zweig tested this hypothesis through field research in rural Jiangsu, at eight universities across China, in harbours and development zones in Jiangsu and Shanghai, and in a study of foreign aid to China. This research resulted in the book Internationalizing China: domestic interests and global linkages, as well as a series of articles on the impact of transnational linkages on China's internal development.

=== China's energy policy and resource diplomacy ===
Zweig has also examined China's energy policy, and its 'resource diplomacy.' In his paper in Foreign Affairs, he showed that the search for energy was a key driver behind much of Beijing's foreign policy. He also asserted that a "resource-based foreign policy" is crucial for both the country's economic development and the CCP's continued political survival. He also tested the argument that much of China's resource diplomacy occurred within a triangular relationship, including the US hegemon, China, and the third resource rich country.

David A. Anderson reviewed Zweig's book, Sino-US Energy Triangle: Resource Diplomacy under Hegemony, co-authored with Yufan Hao (2016), and called it "superbly researched." He recommended it to a wide audience by saying, "This book is a good read for... seeking a better understanding of the dynamics of energy diplomacy, national security, and state economic grand strategy".

=== China's rural policy ===
Zweig began his academic career studying rural Chinese politics. In 1980–81, when rural China was impoverished, he lived in the near and distant suburbs of Nanjing Municipality, interviewing local officials to assess the extent to which local variations determined whether more radical or collectivist policies were introduced during the Cultural Revolution or whether no such policies were undertaken locally. At the time of this research, rural China was undergoing decollectivization, as areas where he was working began to dismantle the People's Communes which had been the main organizational structure since 1958. In 1986, he returned to the same areas to study the second stage of rural reform, which involved privatization of land and other parts of the collective property, the opening of private markets, and increased rural-urban migration. His research also analyzed the countryside's integration into the global economy. C. Montgomery Broaded praised Zweig's book, Freeing China's Farmers: Rural Restructuring in the Reform Era, and stated, "Zweig's rich primary data come from several periods of field research... He is thus in the position to assess the impact of variations in local economic conditions in determining the implementation of national policy."

== Bibliography ==
=== Books ===
- Agrarian Radicalism in China, 1968–1981 (1989) ISBN 978-0674434967
- China's Brain Drain to the United States: Views of Overseas Chinese Students and Scholars in the 1990s (1995) ISBN 978-1557290496
- Sino-U.S. Energy Triangles: Resource Diplomacy under Hegemony, David Zweig and Hao Yufan, eds. (2015) ISBN 978-1138778085
- Freeing China's Farmers: Rural Restructuring in the Reform Era (1997) ISBN 978-1563248375
- Internationalizing China: Domestic Interests and Global Linkages (2002) ISBN 978-0801439674

=== Selected articles ===
- Zweig, D. (1997). To return or not to return? Politics vs. economics in China's brain drain. Studies in Comparative International Development, 32(1), 92–125.
- Zweig, D. (1999). Undemocratic capitalism: China and the limits of economism. The National Interest, (56), 63–72.
- Zweig, D. (2001). China's stalled" Fifth Wave": Zhu Rongji's reform package of 1998–2000. Asian Survey, 41(2), 231–247.
- Zweig, D., Changgui, C., & Rosen, S. (2004). Globalization and transnational human capital: Overseas and returnee scholars to China. The China Quarterly, 179, 735–757.
- Zweig, D., & Jianhai, B. (2005). China's global hunt for energy. Foreign affairs, 25–38.
- Zweig, D. (2006). Competing for talent: China's strategies to reverse the brain drain. International Labour Review., 145, 65.
- Zweig, D., Fung, C. S., & Han, D. (2008). Redefining the brain drain: China's 'diaspora option'. Science, Technology and Society, 13(1), 1–33.
- Zweig, D., & Wang, H. (2013). Can China bring back the best? The Communist Party organizes China's search for talent. The China Quarterly, No. 215, 590–615.
- Zweig, D., & Yang, F. (2014). Overseas students, returnees, and the diffusion of international norms into post-Mao China. International Studies Review, 16(2), 252–263.
- Zweig, D. (2016). A Photo Essay of a Failed Reform. Beida, Tiananmen Square and the Defeat of Deng Xiaoping in 1975–76. China Perspectives, 2016(1), 5–28.
- Zweig, D. (2019). Familiarity Breeds Contempt: China's growing "soft power deficit" in Hong Kong. In Soft Power with Chinese Characteristics (pp. 241–261). Routledge.
- Zweig, D., Siqin, K., & Huiyao, W. (2020). 'The best are yet to come:' State programs, domestic resistance and reverse migration of high-level talent to China. Journal of Contemporary China, 29(125), 776–791.
- Zweig, D., & Kang, S. (2020). America challenges China's national talent programs. Center for Strategic and International Studies (CSIS), May.
- Zweig, David; Tsai, Kellee S.; Singh, Alwyn Didar (February 2021). "Reverse entrepreneurial migration in China and India: The role of the state". World Development. 138 105192. doi:10.1016/j.worlddev.2020.105192.
- Du, Zaichao; Sun, Yuting; Zhao, Guochang; Zweig, David (September 2021). "Do Overseas Returnees Excel in the Chinese Labour Market?". The China Quarterly. 247: 875–897. doi:10.1017/S0305741021000023.
