= National Changsha Provisional University =

Historical university in Peking (1937 to 1938)

The National Changsha Provisional University
- 國立長沙臨時大學
- Other names: Linda (臨大)
- Type: National university
- Active: September 10, 1937–April 2, 1938
- Parent institution: Peking University; Tsinghua University; Nankai University
- President: Hu Shi and Gu Yuxiu
- Location: Changsha, Hunan Province, China
- Campus: Urban

The National Changsha Provisional University, or National Changsha Temporary University, abbreviated as Linda (Provisional University), was a joint university formed by the National Tsinghua University, the National Peking University and the private Nankai University in Changsha of China in 1937, during the Second Sino-Japanese War. It was the predecessor of the National Southwest Associated University.

== Establishment and development ==
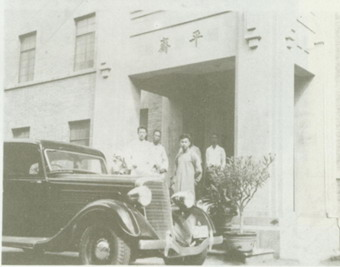
Tsinghua students bid farewell to Pingzhai

On July 7, 1937, the Marco Polo Bridge Incident happened and the Second Sino-Japanese War broke out in China. On the 28th, Peking fell into the Imperial Japanese Army's hands.

On August 28, the Ministry of Education of the National Government sent letters to Zhang Boling, President of Nankai University, Mei Yiqi, President of Tsinghua University and Jiang Menglin, President of Peking University, respectively, appointing the three as members of the preparatory committee of Changsha Provisional University.

On September 10, 1937, the Ministry of Education issued Order No. 16696, officially announcing the establishment of the National Changsha Provisional University. And a new library for the provisional university was set up by the three universities, the National Library of Peiping, and the Institute of History and Philology, Academia Sinica. The facilities and equipment were quite improvised and primitive. However, the library was able to develop right away such that the most basic teaching, working, and learning needs of the teachers and students could be met.

In October, more than 1,600 teachers and students from the three universities arrived in Changsha after a 1,500 km journey from Peking. They walked the entire distance carrying documents and science instruments, begging for food along the way. On October 25, 1937, the Changsha Provisional University officially opened.

On November 1, students began formal classes, and on the same day, the Japanese fighter planes began hovering above Changsha. And this day was later designated as the anniversary of Southwest Associated University. As the school building built by Tsinghua University was not completed, the headquarters was located at the Hunan Bible College in Jiucaiyuan, Changsha. The School of Engineering was located at Yuelu Academy at the foot of Yuelu Mountain. The School of Arts was located in Hengshan. Students from the School of Science and the School of Law and Business lived in the old barracks in Xiecaoping.

Because the three schools had different traditions and lacked school supplies, many people in society at that time questioned whether the temporary university could continue to cooperate. In order to enhance the social influence of the temporary university, the school invited a group of celebrities to give lectures. These figures included Zhang Zhizhong, Chairman of the Hunan Provincial Government, Zhang Jiluan, Editor-in-Chief of the Ta Kung Pao, Bai Chongxi and Chen Cheng, senior generals of the Kuomintang, Chen Duxiu, former General Secretary of the Chinese Communist Party, and Xu Teli, Mao Zedong's teacher. Their speeches were well received by students and had a significant social impact.

On December 13, 1937, Nanjing fell. 1,067 students of the Changsha Temporary University held a solemn meeting at the temporary university headquarters in Jiucaiyuan. Many students decided to join the army and go to the front. This was the first wave of students from the National Changsha Temporary University to join the army. The Standing Committee of the Temporary University quickly established a National Defense Work Introduction Committee and decided that anyone who participated in national defense would retain their student status. During this period, at least 295 students decided to apply to retain their student status and go to participate in the war.

The provisional university operated normally in Changsha for only one semester. On November 20, it had a total of 1,452 students, including 631 from Tsinghua University, 342 from Peking University, and 147 from Nankai University; there were 148 teachers, including 55 from Peking University, 73 from Tsinghua University, and 20 from Nankai University.

== Transfer ==
In January 1938, Changsha suffered multiple air raids by the Japanese Army. Changsha Provisional University decided to move far away to Kunming, Yunnan. In February, after the end of the first semester, equipment and books were shipped to Kunming in batches. On February 19, the teachers and students held a swearing-in ceremony at the Bible College in Jiucaiyuan, Changsha, and began the relocation process.

On April 2, 1938, the Ministry of Education sent a telegram ordering the National Changsha Temporary University to be renamed the "National Southwest Associated University". From the establishment of Changsha Temporary University in August 1937 to the closure of Southwest Associated University on July 31, 1946, Southwest Associated University existed for a total of 8 years and 11 months. Southwest Associated University preserved important scientific research capabilities during the Anti-Japanese War and cultivated a large number of outstanding students, contributing to the development of China and the world.

== Migration routes ==
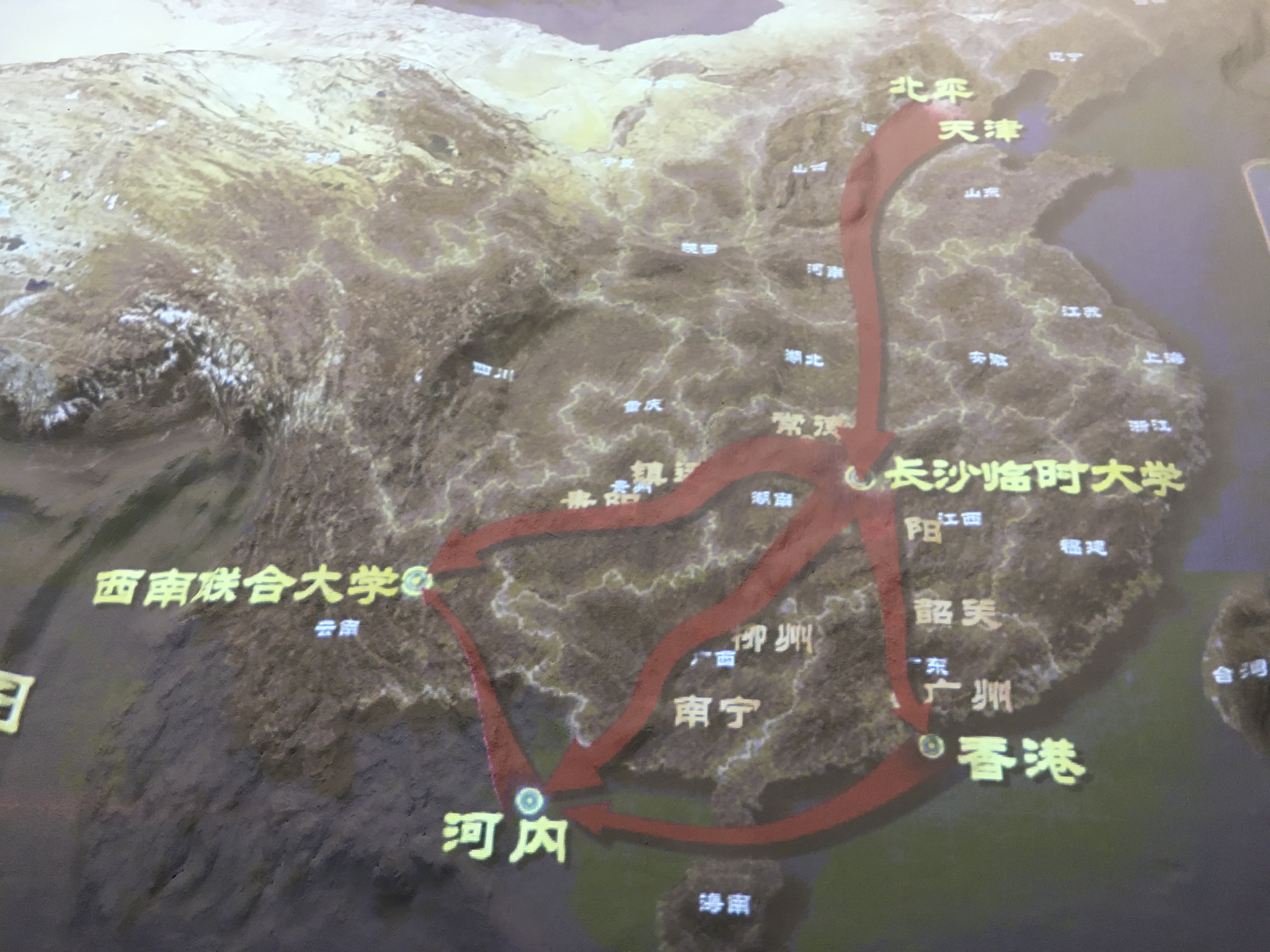
Westward Migration Route Map

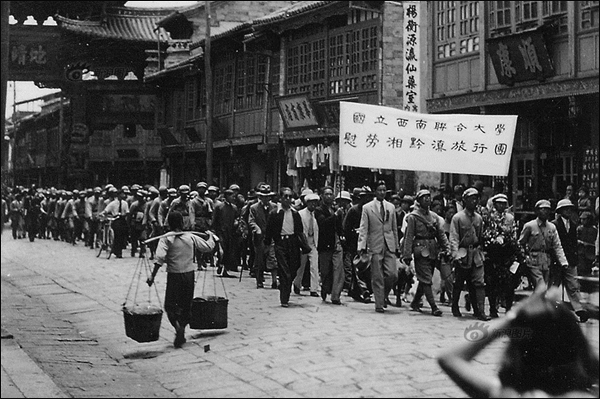
Hunan-Guizhou-Yunnan Tour Group Arrived in Kunming

From mid-February to April 28, 1938, the teachers and students of Changsha Temporary University moved from Changsha to Kunming by three main routes.

=== Hong Kong-Vietnam route ===
It was to take a train from Changsha to Guangzhou and then to Hong Kong, then take a ship to Haiphong, Vietnam, and then take a train into Yunnan. The team members were mostly female students from better-off families. Important professors who took this route included Chen Yinke and others.

=== Guangxi-Vietnam route ===
They traveled by bus from Changsha through Guilin and Liuzhou to Nanning, then through Zhennan Pass to Hanoi, Vietnam, and finally via the Yunnan-Vietnam Railway to Kunming. Males and a few women with better financial resources chose this route.

=== Hunan-Guizhou-Yunnan route ===
This was the most arduous migration route. On February 19, 1938, the teachers and students began their migration, totaling 336 people. The group was led by Lieutenant General Huang Shiyue. Among the group were important professors such as Wen Yiduo, Huang Yusheng, Yuan Fuli, Li Jitong, Zeng Zhaolun, and Wu Zhengyi.The group was equipped with two trucks for carrying their luggage and supplies, along with their own cooks and medical staff.

The teachers and students started from Jiucaiyuan, marched along the Zhongshan Road in Changsha, took a boat along the Xiangjiang River to Changde, then walked through Guzhang County and Huayuan County in western Hunan to Huangguoshu in Guizhou, continued west to Zhanyi in Yunnan, and finally arrived in Kunming. They walked 30 to 40 km. a day, spending the night in temples, monasteries, farmer's shanties or even out in the open. Bandits were numerous in western Hunan, making the journey unsafe. Zhang Zhizhong arranged for the Xiangxi-born writer Shen Congwen to negotiate with various factions there, ultimately refraining from harassing the teachers and students.

On April 28, after an arduous journey, the teachers and students arrived in Kunming. Along the way, we passed through three provincial capitals, 27 counties, and hundreds of villages and towns. It took 68 days and a total distance of 3,248 miles. In addition to taking boats and cars, they walked 2,548 miles. General Huang Shiyue handed over more than 300 teachers and students to Peking University President Jiang Menglin, and no one in the entire "travel group" was injured or killed. The teachers and students treated the migration as a teaching assignment, actively promoting anti-Japanese and national salvation efforts while also diligently learning and practicing.

== Post-event commemoration and former sites ==
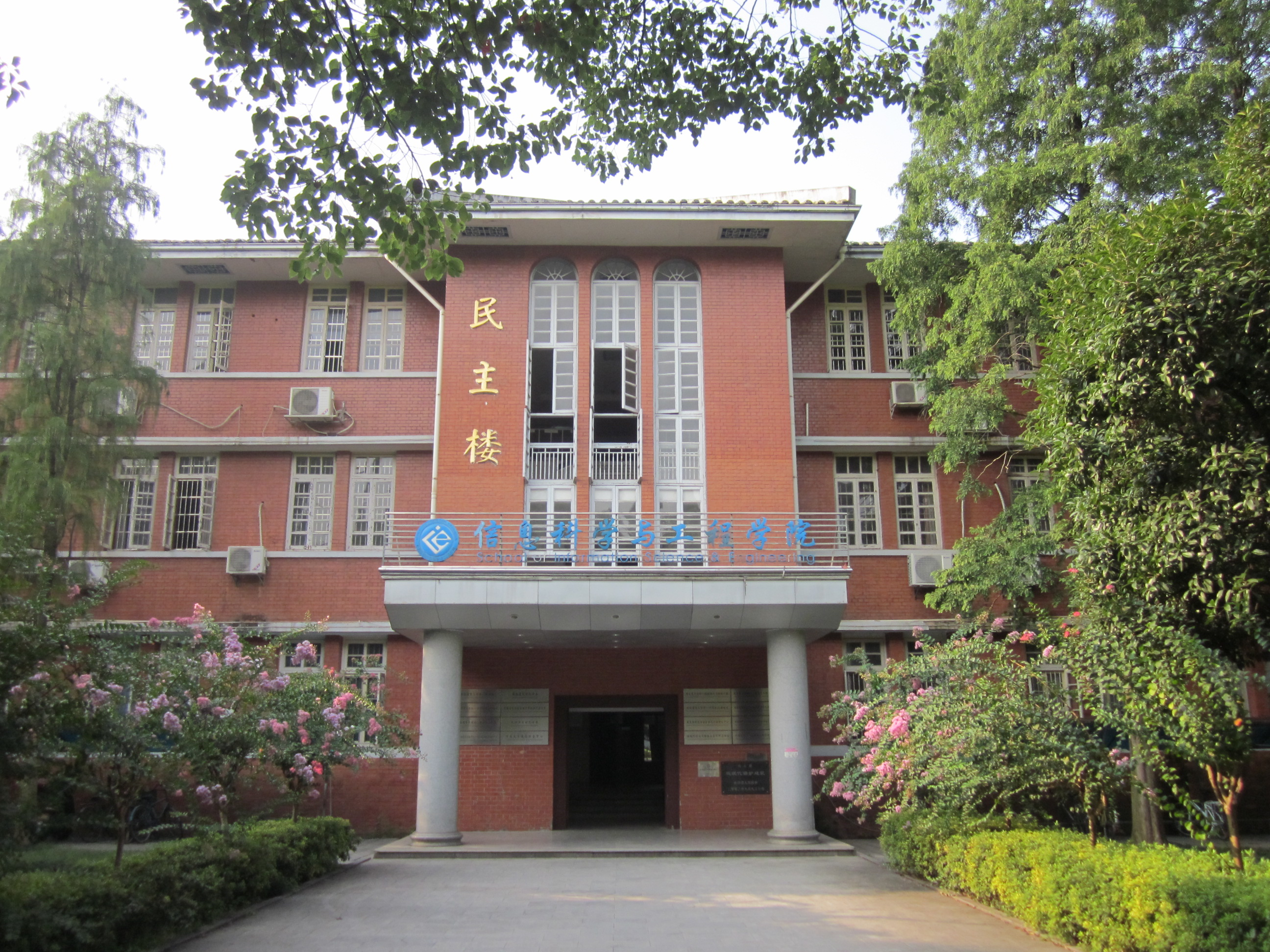
Democracy Building

"November 1", the official opening date of the National Changsha Temporary University, was designated as the anniversary of the National Southwest Associated University. On each anniversary, the three universities would hold celebrations. On the 50th anniversary, Nankai University erected the "National Southwest Associated University Monument".

The former site of the teaching building of Changsha Temporary University was the third office building on the west side of the Hunan Provincial Government in Jiucaiyuan, Changsha. It was originally the teaching building of the Hunan Bible School. The School of Science of the Temporary University rented the building of Xiangya Medical College, and the Department of Electrical Engineering and the Department of Mechanical Engineering held classes at Hunan University. Other buildings that have been preserved to this day include the round pavilion. The former site of the School of Science and Technology, Yuelu Academy, is well preserved. In 1935, Tsinghua University built the Democracy Building and the Peace Building in Zuojialong (now the site of Central South University), which are still well preserved. There is a boundary marker with the words "Tsinghua" engraved on the front and the boundary marker number "131" on the back.

== See also ==
- National Southwest Associated University
- Tsinghua University
- Peking University
- Nankai University
