= James Robert Slagle =

American computer scientist (1934–2023)

James Robert Slagle (March 1, 1934 – December 3, 2023) was an American computer scientist notable for his many achievements in Artificial Intelligence. Since 1984 he has been the Distinguished Professor of Computer Science at the University of Minnesota, Minneapolis, with former appointments at Johns Hopkins University, the National Institutes of Health (Bethesda, Maryland), the Naval Research Laboratory, Lawrence Livermore Radiation Laboratory, University of California, Berkeley, and the Massachusetts Institute of Technology.

In 1961 in his dissertation at the Massachusetts Institute of Technology with Marvin Minsky, Slagle developed the first expert system, SAINT (Symbolic Automatic INTegrator), which is a heuristic program that solves symbolic integration problems in freshman calculus. Remarkably, among other recognitions, President Dwight D. Eisenhower awarded him $500 for his outstanding work as a blind student.

Slagle died in Bethesda, Maryland on December 3, 2023, at the age of 89.

== 1959 ==
- James Robert Slagle (1959). Formal integration on a digital computer. 14th national meeting of the Association for Computing Machinery

== 1960s ==
- James Robert Slagle (1961). A Heuristic Program that Solves Symbolic Integration Problems in Freshman Calculus, Symbolic Automatic Integrator (Saint). pdf
- James Robert Slagle (1963). A Heuristic Program that Solves Symbolic Integration Problems in Freshman Calculus. Journal of the ACM, Vol. 10, No. 4
- James Robert Slagle (1963). Game Trees, M & N Minimaxing, and the M & N alpha-beta procedure. Artificial Intelligence Group Report 3, UCRL-4671, University of California
- James Robert Slagle (1964). An Efficient Algorithm for Finding Certain Minimum-Cost Procedures for Making Binary Decisions. Journal of the ACM, Vol. 11, No. 3
- James Robert Slagle (1964). On an algorithm for minimum-cost procedures. Communications of the ACM, Vol. 7, No. 11
- James Robert Slagle (1965). A multipurpose Theorem Proving Heuristic Program that learns. IFIP Congress 65, Vol. 2
- James Robert Slagle (1965). Experiments with a deductive question-answering program. Communications of the ACM, Vol. 8, No. 12
- James Robert Slagle (1967). Automatic Theorem Proving With Renamable and Semantic Resolution. Journal of the ACM, Vol. 14, No. 4
- James Robert Slagle, Philip Bursky (1968). Experiments With a Multipurpose, Theorem-Proving Heuristic Program. Journal of the ACM, Vol. 15, No. 1:
- James Robert Slagle, John K. Dixon (1969). Experiments With Some Programs That Search Game Trees. Journal of the ACM, Vol. 16, No. 2, pdf, pdf
- James Robert Slagle, Chin-Liang Chang, Richard C. T. Lee (1969). Completeness Theorems for Semantic Resolution In Consequence-Finding. IJCAI-69, pdf

== 1970s ==
- James Robert Slagle, Chin-Liang Chang, Richard C. T. Lee (1970). A New Algorithm for Generating Prime Implicants. IEEE Transactions on Computers, Vol. 19, No. 4
- James Robert Slagle, John K. Dixon (1970). Experiments with the M & N Tree-Searching Program. Communications of the ACM, Vol. 13, No. 3
- James Robert Slagle (1971). Artificial Intelligence: The Heuristic Programming Approach. McGraw-Hill, New York. amazon
- James Robert Slagle, Carl D. Farell (1971). Experiments in automatic learning for a multipurpose hueristic program. Communications of the ACM, Vol. 14, No. 2
- James Robert Slagle, Richard C. T. Lee (1971). Application of game tree searching techniques to sequential pattern recognition. Communications of the ACM, Vol. 14, No. 2
- Chin-Liang Chang, James Robert Slagle (1979). Using Rewriting Rules for Connection Graphs to Prove Theorems. Artificial Intelligence

== 1980s ==
- James Robert Slagle, John K. Dixon (1980). Finding a good figure that approximately passes through given points. Pattern Recognition, 1980
- John K. Dixon, Herbert A. Johnson, James Robert Slagle (1980). The Prospect of an Under Water Naval Robot. Naval Engineers Journal, Vol. 92, No. 1
- John K. Dixon, Susan A. Bouchard, William G. Kennedy, James Robert Slagle (1981). MARK I Robot. IJCAI'1981, pdf
- James Robert Slagle, John K. Dixon (1984). Freedom descriptions: A way to find figures that approximate given points. Pattern Recognition, 1984
- Henry Hamburger, James Robert Slagle (1986). Heterogeneous discrete expenditure for diminishing returns. Naval Research Logistics Quarterly, Vol. 33, No. 2
- Erach A. Irani, John P. Matts, John M. Long, James Robert Slagle, POSCH group (1989). Using Artificial Neural Nets for Statistical Discovery: Observations after Using Backpropogation, Expert Systems, and Multiple-Linear Regression on Clinical Trial Data. University of Minnesota, Minneapolis, MN 55455, USA, Complex Systems 3, pdf

== 1990s ==
- Erach A. Irani, James Robert Slagle, John M. Long, John P. Matts (1990). Formulating an approach to develop a system for the temporal analysis of clinical trial data: The POSCH AI project. Annals of Mathematics and Artificial Intelligence, Volume 2, Numbers 1-4
- James Robert Slagle, Zbigniew Wieckowski a.k.a. Bishak (1994). Ideas for Intelligent User Interface Design.

== 2000s ==
- Dean F. Hougen, Maria Gini, James Robert Slagle (2000). An Integrated Connectionist Approach to Reinforcement Learning for Robotic Control. ICML '00 Proceedings of the Seventeenth International Conference on Machine Learning
- Pamela McCorduck (2004). Machines Who Think: A Personal Inquiry into the History and Prospects of Artificial Intelligence. A. K. Peters (25th anniversary edition)
