= Liu Chao-han =

Taiwanese physicist and educator

- 劉兆漢
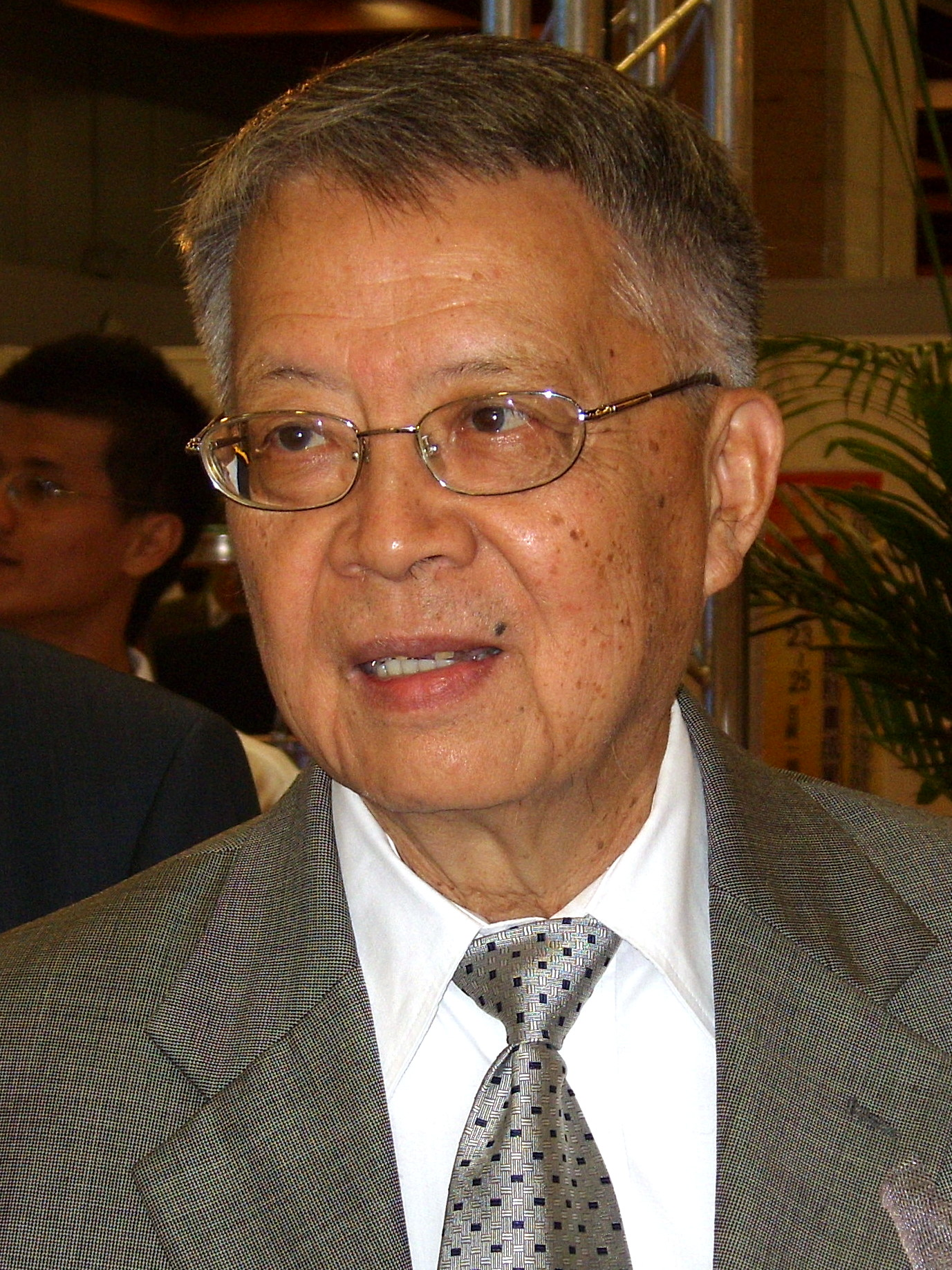
- Liu Chao-han in 2007

President of National Central University
- In office June 1990 – February 2003
- Preceded by: Yu Chuantao
- Succeeded by: Liu Yusheng

Personal details
- Born: 3 January 1939 (age 87) Liuzhou, Guangxi, Republic of China
- Spouse: Mong Tsuei Chu
- Children: 2
- Parent(s): Liu Guoyun; Zhong Wanfang
- Education: National Taiwan University (BS); Brown University (PhD)
- Scientific career
- Fields: Electrical engineering
- Workplaces: Academia Sinica
- Thesis: Reflection of electromagnetic waves from inhomogeneous plasma (1965)
- Doctoral advisor: Lewis B. Wetzel

Liu Chao-han (simplified Chinese: 刘兆汉; traditional Chinese: 劉兆漢; pinyin: Liú Zhàohàn; born 3 January 1939) is a Taiwanese radio engineer/scientist and an international leader in solar terrestrial physics and remote sensing research. He served as Vice President of the Academia Sinica from 2006 to 2011 after serving as President of National Central University for 12 years and as Chancellor of the University System of Taiwan for 4 years. He is a Fellow of the Institute of Electrical and Electronics Engineers, an Academician of the Academia Sinica and a member of the National Academy of Engineering.

== Early life and education ==
Liu was born in Liuzhou, Guangxi, China on January 3, 1939, to Liu Guoyun (Chinese: 劉國運), a general in the Republic of China Armed Forces, and Zhong Wanfang (Chinese: 鍾畹芳). He has five brothers, Liu Chao-Ning (Chinese: 劉兆寧), Liu Chao-Hua (Chinese: 劉兆華), Liu Chao-Li (Chinese: 劉兆藜), Liu Chao-shiuan, and Liu Chao-Kai (Chinese: 劉兆凱).

Liu earned a Bachelor of Science (B.S.) from National Taiwan University in 1960. He then studied engineering in the United States at Brown University, where he earned his Ph.D. in 1965 under physicist Lewis B. Wetzel.

== Career ==
He started his academic career at the University of Illinois at Urbana-Champaign in 1965 where he taught Electrical Engineering for 25 years. He was promoted to full professor in 1974 and became professor emeritus in 1993. From 1981 to 1999, he played leadership roles in the Scientific Committee on Solar Terrestrial Physics (SCOSTEP) of the International Council of Scientific Unions (ICSU), first as Scientific Secretary, and later as the President.

He is one of the founding leaders of Taiwan's Space Program. Shortly after returning to Taiwan in 1990 and based on his earlier research, he proposed and guided the implementation of the Constellation Observation System for Meteorology Ionosphere & Climate, FORMOSAT III/COSMIC, in collaboration with University Corporation for Atmospheric Research (UCAR) and the Jet Propulsion Laboratory (JPL) in the United States. From 2006 to 2020, the data collected by this system enabled the drastic improvement in the daily weather forecast. Almost all major weather centers around the world were using the data from FORMOSAT-III/COSMIC for their forecasting operations.

In related work, Liu, in the 1980s together with his students, innovated a versatile and inexpensive technology known as "Computerized Ionosphere Tomography (CIT)" which was adopted for the remote sensing of the structure and dynamics of the ionospheres worldwide. Liu also established a VHF Radar system at National Central University to investigate the atmospheric waves and turbulence.

Since the mid-1990's, he led a group of scientists with different disciplinary backgrounds to carry out global change and sustainability research in Taiwan and Southeast Asia, establishing Taiwan as a regional leader in this field internationally.

During his presidency at the National Central University (1990-2002), he helped transform the university to become one of the top research universities in Taiwan. In 2003, he became the founding Chancellor of the University System of Taiwan which has become a new model of collaboration among universities in the country.

== Recognition ==
Liu is an Academican of the Academia Sinica (1998); an elected Member of the Academy of Sciences for the Developing World (TWAS); and an International Member of the National Academy of Engineering (2012).

He was awarded the Special Achievement Award from IEEE-APS (1968); elected a Fellow of the Institute of Electrical and Electronics Engineers (1981); the Brown Engineering Award Medal (1997); the Distinguished Alumni Award of National Taiwan University (2008) and the Horace Mann Medal (2011-2012).

In 2019, National Central University named the No. 207603 asteroid discovered by the Lulin Observatory as "Liuchaohan" in his honor.

== Personal life ==
Liu married Mong Tsuei Chu (Chinese: 孟粹珠). They have a daughter, Alice C.Y. Liu, and a son, Robert C.B. Liu.

Educational offices
Preceded by Yu Chuantao (余傳韜)	President of National Central University; 1990–2003	Succeeded by Liu Quansheng (劉全生)
