= P. Steven Sangren =

Paul Steven Sangren (Chinese: 桑高仁, born April 2, 1946) is a socio-cultural anthropologist of China and Taiwan, and is a leading expert in the study of Chinese religion. He is Hu Shih Distinguished Professor Emeritus of Chinese Studies and Anthropology at Cornell University. His research interests include socio-cultural anthropology, religion and ritual, gender, psychoanalysis, practice, China and Taiwan.

== Early life ==
Sangren was born on April 2, 1946, in Kalamazoo, Michigan. He earned his B.A. from Woodrow Wilson School, Princeton University in 1968. After Princeton, he joined the Navy and attended the U.S. Naval Officer Candidate School at Newport, Rhode Island. Subsequently, Sangren was commissioned as a LTJG and served in the Underwater Demolition Team Eleven from 1969 to 1972. In 1972, Sangren headed for Stanford University to pursue his Ph.D. in anthropology under the supervision of G. William Skinner. He conducted fieldwork on the Mazu's cult in Taiwan between 1974 and 1977. Sangren received his Ph.D. in January 1980.

== Academic career ==
After completing his Ph.D. in 1980, Sangren became an assistant professor of anthropology at Cornell University. He was promoted to associate professor in 1986 and to Professor in 1992. Sangren was the associate director of Cornell's East Asia Program between 1988 and 1989, and chair of Cornell's Anthropology department between 1997 and 2000. Sangren was named the Hu Shih Distinguished Professor of China Studies in 2017.

== Publications ==
Books

2017 Filial Obsessions: Chinese Patriliny and Its Discontents. Palgrave Macmillan.

2000 Chinese Sociologics: An Anthropological Account of Alienation and Social Reproduction. London: Bloomsbury Academic.

1997 Myth, Gender, and Subjectivity. Hsin Chu Bank Endowed Lecture Series on Thought and Culture. The Program for Research of Intellectual-Cultural History, College of Humanities and Social Sciences, National Tsing Hua University, Hsin-chu, Taiwan: R.O.C.

1987 History and Magical Power in a Chinese Community. Stanford, CA: Stanford University Press.

Academic Articles

2013 The Chinese family as instituted fantasy: or, rescuing kinship imaginaries from the ‘symbolic'. Journal of the Royal Anthropological Institute 19(2):279-299.

2012 Fate, Agency, and the Economy of Desire in Chinese Ritual and Society. Social Analysis 56(2):117-135.

2010 Lessons for General Social Theory in the Legacy of G. William Skinner from the Perspectives of Gregory Bateson and Terence Turner. Taiwan Journal of Anthropology 8(1):47-64.

2009 'Masculine Domination': Desire and Chinese Patriliny. Critique of Anthropology 29(3):255-278.

2007 Anthropology of Anthropology? Further Reflections on Reflexivity. Anthropology Today 23(4):13-16.

2006 Introduction to Turner Special Issue. Critique of Anthropology 26(1):5-13.

2006 ‘Fraught with Implications’, or Turner's Back-burner. Critique of Anthropology 26(1):121-130.

2004 Psychoanalysis and Its Resistances in Michel Foucault's The History of Sexuality: Lessons for Anthropology. Ethos 32(1):110-122.

2001 China: Sociocultural Aspects. International Encyclopedia of the Social & Behavioral Sciences. N. K. Smelser and P. B. Baltes, eds. 3:1:1733-1738. Elsevier Ltd.

Chapters

2009 Chinese Ghosts: Reconciling Psychoanalytic, Structuralist, and Marxian Perspectives. In Rethinking Ghosts in World Religions. Poo, Mu-chou, ed. pp 299–310. Leiden, Netherlands: Brill.

2005 Fate and Transcendence in the Rhetoric of Myth and Ritual. In The Magnitude of Ming: Command, Allotment, and Fate in Chinese Culture. Christopher Lupke, ed. pp. 225–244. Honolulu, Hawaii: University of Hawaii Press.

2003 Separations, Autonomy, and Recognition in the Production of Gender Differences: Reflections from Consideration of Myths and Laments. In Living with Separation in China: Anthropological Accounts. Charles Stafford, ed. pp. 53–84. London: RoutledgeCurzon.
