= Shen Chun-shan =

Taiwanese physicist (1932–2018)

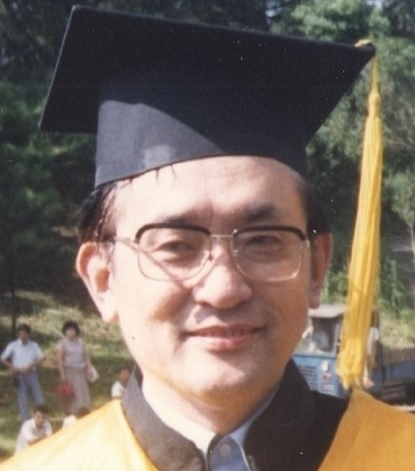
- Dr. Chun-Shan Shen in Tsing Hua campus, June 1987
- Born: 29 August 1932; Nanking, China
- Died: 12 September 2018 (aged 86); Mackay Memorial Hospital, Hsinchu, Taiwan
- Education: National Taiwan University (BS); University of Maryland, College Park (PhD)
- Employer: National Tsing Hua University

Chinese name
- Chinese: 沈君山
- Hanyu Pinyin: Shěn Jūnshān
- Wade–Giles: Shen^{3} Chün^{1}-shan^{1}
- Hokkien POJ: Sím Kun-san

Shen Chun-shan (29 August 1932 – 12 September 2018) was a Taiwanese physicist who served as president of National Tsing Hua University from 1994 to 1997. He was known as one of the "four princes of Taiwan" along with Chen Li-an, Fredrick Chien, and Lien Chan, all of whose fathers attained prominence in politics prior to their sons' successes.

== Early life and education ==
Shen was born in Nanjing; his paternal family roots are in Yuyao, Zhejiang. His father Shen Tsung-han was an agricultural expert. Shen's parents were both highly educated and had studied in the United States; his maternal grandfather also went to France as an exchange student. Shen followed his father to Taiwan a few years later in 1949. Shen's father rose to further political prominence in Taiwan, eventually becoming the chairman of the Council of Agriculture.

Shen graduated from National Taiwan University's physics department in 1955. In 1957, he left Taiwan for the United States, to enroll in a doctoral program in physics from the University of Maryland, from which he graduated in 1961. His dissertation was titled, "Dispersion relation for the electron impact width and shift of an isolated line".

== Career ==
Shen went on teach at Princeton University and Purdue University as well as taking up a position at NASA.

=== Return to Taiwan ===
Shen returned to Taiwan in 1973 to take up a post as the head of National Tsing Hua University's sciences faculty, at a salary only one-eighth that which he received in the United States, earning him praise as a "model of patriotism" for his actions. While maintaining his teaching position, he also served as the head of various semi-official think tanks until 1984.

Shen formally returned to politics in 1988 with his naming as Minister without Portfolio in the Executive Yuan, an appointment which drew surprise at the time because he was not then a member of the Kuomintang. He later served as a member of the Central Election Commission, a member of the Council of the Academia Sinica, and most prominently with the National Unification Council, as a member of which he made three visits to Zhongnanhai to meet with People's Republic of China leaders. During these meetings, Shen who supported unification, pointed out to Communist Party general secretary Jiang Zemin the need to respect people on both sides of the Taiwan Strait.

Shen took up his post as the president of National Tsing Hua University in 1993; he retired from that position and from academic life in 1997.

=== Other activities ===
Outside of his academic and political work, Shen enjoyed playing Go and contract bridge. He was a member of the Republic of China team that finished second in the 1969 Bermuda Bowl world teams bridge championship, a particularly notable success given that he and teammate Frank Huang had never previously played as partners. He was ranked as a 6th-dan go player. In 1978, he got Harvey Feldman, then Director of the United States Department of State's Office of Republic of China Affairs, to reveal over a game of Go the timetable for the Joint Communiqué on the Establishment of Diplomatic Relations which would end formal relations between Washington and Taipei. Novelist Jin Yong introduced Shen to world Go champion and People's Republic of China citizen Nie Weiping in 1984 in Hong Kong; the two would go on to become good friends through their mutual interest in both Go and bridge, though they did not have many opportunities to meet. In 1991, they were able to integrate their bridge play into cross-straits diplomacy, entering the 1991 Far East Championships in Guangzhou as partners. 9th-dan professional Go player Cho U also credited Shen with teaching him the game as a child; the two first played when Cho was seven.

Shen started the first overseas chapter of the University of Maryland's alumni association, and was a member of the first group elected to their Alumni Hall of Fame when it was established in 1995.

== Illness and death ==
Shen's health deteriorated further after his retirement; he suffered his first stroke in June 1999. In September 2005, a year and a half after the 2004 publication of the first portion of his memoirs, he suffered his second stroke. However, even after his second stroke, he continued writing; his series of biographies of five Go masters Go Seigen, Minoru Kitani, Rin Kaiho, Cho Hunhyun, and Nie Weiping was published in June 2006. On 6 July 2007, he suffered his third stroke, involving intracranial hemorrhage; he was hospitalised at Hsinchu's Mackay Memorial Hospital.

After surgery, his condition stabilised, but he was left in a coma. Later in the year, he was transferred to Wanfang Hospital. Doctors there assessed his condition as roughly nine points on the Glasgow Coma Scale, meaning that his brain was still basically in good condition, and there remained a possibility that he might regain awareness. In early 2008, he showed some response to voices, and his condition was reportedly continuing to improve. However, from 2012 until his death, he remained comatose.

Shen had many famous visitors while in his coma. In October 2009, Nie Weiping travelled to Taiwan to see Shen, in what he described as a "final visit". Chi Cheng also came to sing to Shen every so often, not knowing whether he could hear her or not; she and her former Tsing Hua professor visited Shen in January 2010 while in Hsinchu. Ma Ying-jeou paid a visit in February 2011, and recited poetry for Shen, to which Shen reportedly showed some response.

Shen was sent to Mackay Memorial Hospital in Hsinchu on 5 September 2018, with a fever and a swollen belly where he went for colonoscopy screening. The doctors found a twisted and necrotic section in Shen's intestine, the statement said, CNA reports. He died on 12 September from a ruptured intestine, aged 86.

== Minor planet ==
In May 2009, the International Astronomical Union announced that they had formally accepted the suggestion to name a minor planet discovered in April 2006 after Shen, making its official designation 202605 Shenchunshan.

== Publications ==
- 《浮生後記》 [Memoirs of a Floating Life] (in Chinese), Bookzone, March 2004, ISBN 986-417-152-6
- 《浮生再記》 [Memoirs of a Floating Life 2] (in Chinese), Bookzone, September 2005, ISBN 957-444-257-8
- 《浮生三記》 [Memoirs of a Floating Life 3] (in Chinese), Bookzone, September 2005, ISBN 957-444-255-1
- The series 《沈君山說棋王故事》 (Shen Chun-shan Tells the Stories of Kings of Go):
  1. 《吳清源》 [Go Seigen] (in Chinese), Boss, June 2006, ISBN 957-588-493-0
  2. 《木谷實》 [Kitani Minoru] (in Chinese), Boss, June 2006, ISBN 957-588-497-3
  3. 《林海峰》 [Rin Kaiho] (in Chinese), Boss, June 2006, ISBN 957-588-494-9
  4. 《曹薰鉉》 [Cho Hunhyun] (in Chinese), Boss, June 2006, ISBN 957-588-495-7
  5. 《聶衛平》 [Nie Weiping] (in Chinese), Boss, June 2006, ISBN 957-588-496-5

Academic offices
Preceded by R. C. T. Lee	President of National Tsing Hua University; 1994–1997	Succeeded by Chen Hsin-hsiung
