= Hsia Chu-joe =

Taiwanese activist and architect

Hsia Chu-joe 夏鑄九
- Born: 1947 (age 78–79); Nanjing, China
- Education: Feng Chia University (BS); Yale University (MArch); Harvard University (MArch); University of California, Berkeley (PhD)
- Occupation: Architect
- Spouse: Yu Shangqing (m. 2019)
- Scientific career
- Fields: Architecture
- Thesis: An epistemological critique of contemporary aesthetic theories on architecture: Towards a social theory on the cultural form of space (1987)
- Doctoral advisor: Sara Ishikawa

Hsia Chu-joe (traditional Chinese: 夏鑄九; simplified Chinese: 夏铸九; pinyin: Xià Zhùjiǔ; born 1947) is a Taiwanese activist, architect, and academic specializing in urban design.

== Early life and education ==
Hsia was born in Nanjing, Republic of China in 1947. His father Hsia Hsiao-hua founded the Taiwan Daily. Hsia Chu-joe has two younger siblings, brother Hsia Yu-joe, and sister Hsia Lin-ching.

Hsia graduated from Feng Chia College of Engineering and Business in 1971 with a bachelor's degree in architectural engineering. He then completed graduate studies in the United States, earning a Master of Architecture (M.Arch.) from Yale University in 1975 and a second M.Arch. degree from Harvard University in 1977.

Hsia began teaching at what became National Taiwan University's Graduate Institute of Building and Planning after completing his second master's degree. In 1987, Hsia earned his Ph.D. in architecture from the University of California, Berkeley. His doctoral dissertation was titled, "An epistemological critique of contemporary aesthetic theories on architecture: towards a social theory on the cultural form of space".

== Career ==
Between 1997 and 2012, Hsia served as chief editor of the academic journal Cities and Design. In 2013, Hsia was elected a distinguished fellow of the International Forum on Urbanism. Between 2013 and 2016, Hsia was Yixing Chair Professor of Nanjing University. From 2014 to 2016, Hsia was president of the Asian Planning Schools Association. He later taught at Southeast University as Tongjuan Chair Professor within the School of Architecture.

In 2004, Hsia served as the inaugural convener of the architectural group at the National Arts Awards. In 2010, Hsia helped evaluate bids for the Pop Music Center at Kaohsiung Harbor. In 2015, Hsia was elected chair of the jury that selected the winning bid for the Taiwan Taoyuan International Airport Terminal 3 Area International Design Competition. That year, Hsia concurrently served on the Taipei City Government's Cultural Heritage Evaluation Committee. Hsia was invited to judge the entrants for the first Taiwan Light Environment Award presented by the Coretronic Culture and Arts Foundation in 2018.

Hsia is also an activist, and identifies with the political left. Hsu Hsin-liang considered Hsia as a potential vice presidential candidate in his 2000 presidential campaign, before he chose Josephine Chu as his running mate. Hsia is a founding member of the Coalition for Equal Opportunity, established in 2004. Hsia spoke at the 2014 Taipei International Book Exhibition in support of independent bookstores. He pushed for the Losheng Sanatorium to be preserved without the evictions of its residents. He has been critical of Taiwan's "twisted" development, stating in 2000, "Taiwan is seriously ill. It's because of the dominant ideology's focus on economic development over the past 30 years." In 2012, Hsia described Taiwan's attempts at cultural preservation as materialistic, due to influence by the Western world. He is a proponent of involving people in the process of reconstruction and cultural preservation.

== Personal life ==
Hsia's first marriage was to Wang Mei (王槑), with whom he had a son. He later married Chen Ming-fang (陳明芳). In February 2019, Hsia married Yu Shangqing (于上清), who is 40 years his junior, in Nanjing. Yu, a Chinese computer engineer with a Ph.D. degree, had helped Hsia process electronic information.
