= Mao Kao-wen =

Taiwanese chemist, politician, and diplomat (1936–2019)

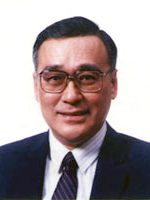
Mao Kao-wen

Mao Kao-wen (Chinese: 毛高文; pinyin: Máo Gāowén; 9 February 1936 Fenghua, Ningbo – 28 October 2019 Taipei) was a Taiwanese chemist, politician, and diplomat. He served as the president of National Tsinghua University from 1981 to 1987. He also was the Minister of Education of the Republic of China from June 1987 to February 1993.

Mao died on 28 October 2019 at the Taipei Veterans General Hospital, aged 83.

Government offices
Preceded by Lee Huan	ROC Minister of Education; 1987–1993	Succeeded by Guo Weifan
Academic offices
Preceded by Chang Ming-che	President of National Tsing Hua University; 1981–1987	Succeeded by Liu Chao-shiuan
Non-profit organization positions
Preceded by Li Yih-yuan	Chairman of the Chiang Ching-kuo Foundation; 2010–2019	Succeeded by Fredrick Chien
