= Chinese plum =

Chinese plum is a common name for several plants and may refer to:

- Prunus mume
- Prunus salicina, native to China
- Loquat, Eriobotrya japonica
