= National Southwestern Associated University =

Public university in Kunming, Yunnan, China

- 國立西南聯合大學
- Other name: Lianda (聯大)
- Motto: 剛毅堅卓
- Type: National university
- Active: April 2, 1938–May 4, 1946
- Parent institution: Peking University; Tsinghua University; Nankai University
- Location: Kunming 1938–1946, Yunnan Province, China; Changsha 1937–1938, Hunan Province, Chin; 25°03′33″N 102°41′42″E
- Campus: Urban

The National Southwestern Associated University was a national public university in Kunming, Yunnan, China, from 1938 to 1946. It was formed by the wartime incorporation of National Peking University, National Tsinghua University, and National Nankai University.

When the Second Sino-Japanese War broke out between China and Japan in 1937, Peking University, Tsinghua University and Nankai University merged to form Changsha Temporary University in Changsha and later National Southwestern Associated University in Kunming and Mengzi, in Southwest China's Yunnan Province. After the war, the universities moved back and resumed their operation. What was left behind in Kunming became the National Kunming Normal University which later emerged as the Yunnan Normal University.

== History ==
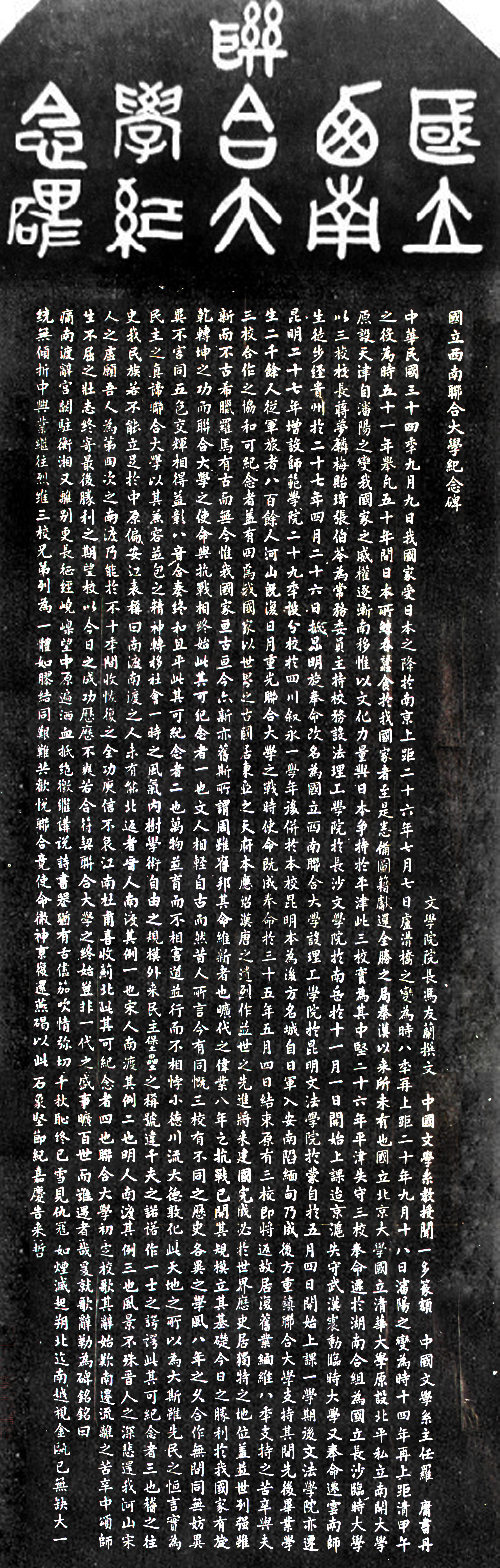
Commemorative stone of the university

By summer 1937, the Imperial Japanese Army had bombed Nankai University to the ground in Tianjin and occupied areas including the campuses of Peking University and Tsinghua University. These three universities retreated to Changsha, the capital city of Hunan province (about 900 miles away from Beijing) to unite. By the middle of December 1937, many students had to leave to fight the Japanese when the city of Nanjing fell to enemy forces.

Japanese forces bombed Changsha in February 1938. The 800 staff faculty and students who were left had to flee and made the 1,000 mile journey to Kunming, capital of Yunnan province in China's remote and mountainous southwest.

In August 1937, the Ministry of Education combined the relocated National Beijing University, National Qinghua University, and Nankai University into National Southwest Associated University (Xi'nan Lianda). The university's mission focused on preserving Chinese culture.

After the Second Sino-Japanese War broke out, university students in North China faced challenges. In 1938, while China's Ministry of Education required all higher education institutions to make "General History of China" a compulsory course for all first-year students, there was no suitable textbook available. With the encouragement of his colleague Chen Mengjia, Ch'ien Mu, then a professor at Lianda, began writing the Outline of National History (國史大綱).

Lianda alumni include the Nobel Prize laureates Yang Chen-Ning and Tsung-Dao Lee.

=== Aftermath ===
Following the war, the majority of the Lianda community had returned to their north China campuses in Beijing and Tianjin.

== See also ==
- National Changsha Provisional University
- List of universities in Yunnan
- History of education in China
- Higher education in China
- Education in the People's Republic of China
- Education in the Republic of China
