= R. C. T. Lee =

Taiwanese computer scientist

- 李家同
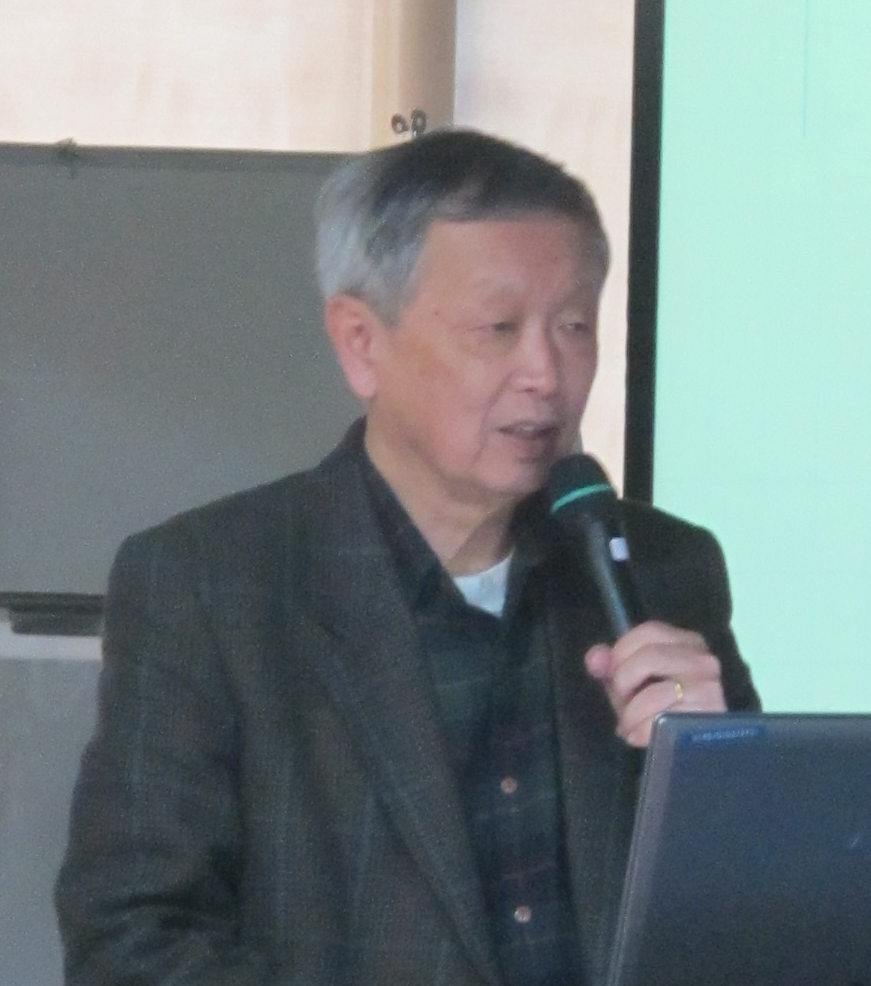
- Born: February 4, 1938 (age 88); Shanghai, China
- Education: National Taiwan University (BS); University of California, Berkeley (MS, PhD)
- Scientific career
- Fields: Electrical engineering, computer science
- Workplaces: National Chi Nan University

Lee Chia-Tung (Chinese: 李家同; born 1938 in Shanghai, China), also known by his English name Richard C. T. Lee, is a Taiwanese electrical engineer.

== Education and career ==
Lee graduated from National Taiwan University with a B.S. in electrical engineering and earned an M.S. and Ph.D. from the University of California, Berkeley, in electrical engineering and computer science. He worked for NCR from 1963 to 1964 after he got his M.S. degree. After getting his Ph.D. degree, he joined National Institutes of Health, Bethesda, Maryland, in 1967 and later worked in Naval Research Laboratory, Washington, D.C., in 1974.

He returned to Taiwan in 1975 and started his teaching career in National Tsing Hua University, Hsinchu, Taiwan. In this university, he had been the chairperson of Department of Computer Science and Department of Electrical Engineering. In 1984, after he became the dean of College of Engineering and in 1988, he was appointed as the provost. In 1994, he was the acting president of National Tsing Hua University. From 1994 to 1999, he was the president of Providence University in Shalu, Taiwan and in 1999, he was the president of National Chi Nan University, Puli, Taiwan. He is now a professor of Chi Nan University under the joint appointment of four departments: the Department of Computer Science, the Department of Information Management, the Department of Communication and the Department of Medical Science.

Lee has published roughly 80 papers, all in prestigious academic journals. He has been editors for ten journals. In 1989, he became an IEEE fellow. He received the Distinguished Research Awards from the National Science Council, Republic of China, five times and the Ministry of Education Engineering Academic Achievement Award in 1989. He is a Micronix Chair Professor. Lee and R.C.Chang coauthored the book “Symbolic Logic and Mechanical Theorem Proving” which was published by Academic Press in 1973. This book was translated into Japanese, Russian and Italian. In 2005, McGraw-Hill published his “Introduction to the Design and Analysis of Algorithms, a Strategic Approach”, which he coauthored with S.S. Tseng, R.C. Chang and Y.T.Tsai. In addition to publishing technical papers, Lee has also been an author of short stories. His four books, “Let the Wall Come Down”, “The Stranger”, “The Curtain Never Falls” and “The Bell Rings Again” have been all popular in Taiwan. “Let the Wall Come Down” has been sold more than 300,000 copies within a short period of seven years. He also published a book advising young people to pay attention to basics, entitled “Let Us Go Back to Basics”. Lee is a professor of both the Computer Science and Information Engineering Department and Information Management Department of National Chi Nan University.

Lee is an IEEE fellow. He co-authored Symbolic Logic and Mechanical Theorem Proving.

== Timeline ==
1. Engineer, National Cash Register Company, U.S.A., 1962–1963.

2. Senior Research Fellow, Occupational Safety and Health Administration, U.S. Department of Labor, October 1967 – June, 1974.

3. Research Fellow, Research Institute of U.S.A. Navy, Aug. 1974 – August 1975.

4. Chairman, Institute of Applied Mathematics, National Tsing Hua University, August 1975 – July 1977.

5. Chairman, Institute of Computer Management, National Tsing Hua University, August 1977 – July 1983.

6. Chairman, Department of Electronic Engineering, National Tsing Hua University, August 1983 – July 1984.

7. Dean, College of Engineering, National Tsing Hua University, August 1984 – July 1988.

8. Provost and acting president, National Tsing Hua University, August 1988 – January 1994.

9. President, Providence University, February 1994 – June 1999.

10. President, National Chi Nan University, July 1999 – November 1999.

11. Professor, Department of Computer Science and Information Engineering, National Chi Nan University, December 1999 – Present.

== Awards ==
1. 1989: IEEE Fellow.

2. Distinguished Research Awards of the National Science Council of the R.O.C., 1989–1993.

3. Academic Engineering Research Award of Ministry of Education of the R.O.C., 1989.

4. Outstanding Research Award of the Hou Jin-Dui Foundation, 1993.

5. 1995 TECO Technology Award of the TECO Technology Foundation, 1995.

6. Distinguished Research Fellow of National Science Council of the R.O.C., Since 1986.

7. Medal of Honor of the Institute of Information and Computing Machinery, 2001.

8. Chair Professor of Macronix International Co. Ltd, Since 2001.

9. Heritage Prize of The Phi Tau Phi Scholastic Honor Society of the R. O. C., 2004.

10. Honorary Doctorate Degree, ed Ph.D., Christian Chung Yuan University, Taiwan, 2005.

11. Second Class Economics Medal of Honor from the Ministry of Economics Affairs, 2005.

== Books written by R. C. T. Lee ==
- "Let the Wall Come Down", by Linkingbooks Press.
- "The Stranger", by Linkingbooks Press.
- "The Curtain Never Falls", by Futurebooks Press.
- "The Bell Rings Again", by Linkingbooks Press.
- "The Basic English Grammar for Chinese ", by Linkingbooks Press.
- "Let Us Go Back to Basics", by Yuan Sun Press.
- Lee, R. C. T., Shen, C. W. and Chang, S. C., 1982, Compilers, in “Handbook of Software Engineering”, (edited by C. R. Vick and C. VOL. Ramamoorthy), Van Nostrand Reinhold, N.Y., pp. 201–233.
- Lee, R. C. T., 1981, Clustering Analysis and its Applications, in “Advances in Information System Science”, (edited by J. T. Tou), Plenum Press, N.Y., pp. 169–287.
- Introduction to the Design and Analysis of Algorithms
- Symbolic Logic and Mechanical Theorem Proving

Academic offices
Preceded by Liu Chao-shiuan	President of National Tsing Hua University; 1993–1994	Succeeded by Shen Chun-shan
