= Guoguang =

Guoguang may refer to:

- Guoguang (Jiangxi), a supermarket chain in China
- Kuokuang Power Plant, a gas-fired power plant in Taiwan
- Kuo-Kuang Motor Transportation, a bus company in Taiwan
- Project National Glory, a planned attempt by the Republic of China (ROC)

== People ==
- David Chong, a lawyer and business owner
- Kwek Kok Kwong (1967–2020), the chief executive officer of NTUC LearningHub
- Mu Guoguang (1931–2012), a Chinese opticist
- Phoon Kok Kwang, a Singaporean civil engineer

== See also ==
- 國光 (disambiguation)
