= Zhang Xiaowen =

Zhang Xiaowen (in pinyin, for Wade–Giles: Chang Hsiao-wen) may refer to:

- Zhang Xiaowen (scientist) (张孝文), Chinese material scientist and educator
- Zhang Xiaowen (chess player) (章晓雯), Chinese chess Woman Grandmaster
- Zhang Xiaowen (footballer) (張小文), Chinese soccer player

== See also ==
- Xiaowen (disambiguation)
- Zhang (disambiguation)
- Xiaowen Zeng (曾晓文), Chinese author
- Chiang Hsiao-wen (蔣孝文), Soviet
