= Wu Mei =

Wu Mei is the pinyin romanization of:

- Wǔ Méi (五梅; Cantonese: Ng Mui), the legendary kung fu nun.
- Wǔ Mèi (武媚), the given name of the Empress Wu.
- Wùměi (物美), Chinese name of the Wumart retail company.
