= Xiaowen =

Xiaowen may refer to:

- King Xiaowen of Qin (reigned 250 BC)
- Emperor Xiaowen of Northern Wei (467–499)
- Emperor Wen of Han (202 BC–157 BC)
- Jiang Xiaowen
- Ye Xiaowen (born 1950), Chinese politician who held various top posts relating to state regulation of religion from 1995 to 2009
- Xiaowen Zeng, Chinese author living in Toronto, Canada
- Zhou Xiaowen (born 1954), Chinese filmmaker
- Xiao Wen Ju (born 1989), Chinese fashion model

== See also ==
- Zhang Xiaowen (disambiguation)
