= Rao Zihe =

Chinese biophysicist (born 1950)

Rao Zihe (Chinese: 饶子和, born September 1950) is a Chinese biophysicist and former president of Nankai University. He is an academician of the Chinese Academy of Sciences and of The World Academy of Sciences.

== Biography ==
Rao was born in September 1950 in Nanjing, Jiangsu, and graduated from University of Science and Technology of China in 1977. He received his master's degree from Graduate School of Chinese Academy of Sciences in 1982, and PhD in biophysics from University of Melbourne in 1989. He subsequently worked as a postdoctoral researcher in David Stuart laboratory in Oxford University. In 1997, he returned to China and established the Structural Biology Laboratory in Tsinghua University. He became the director of Institute of Biophysics, Chinese Academy of Sciences in 2003, and the president of Nankai University in 2006.

Rao published the structure of a calcium binding human epidermal growth factor-like protein, the first crystal structure in the EGF family, in 1995. During the SARS outbreak, Rao's laboratory solved the first crystal structure of a SARS coronavirus protein, the SARS-CoV Main Protease.

Rao was elected a member of the Chinese Academy of Sciences in 2003, and a member of the Third World Academy of Sciences in 2004. Rao was also the president of Biophysics Society of China from 2006 to 2017.
