= Zhang Wenzhong =

Chinese businessman and scholar (born 1962)

- 张文中
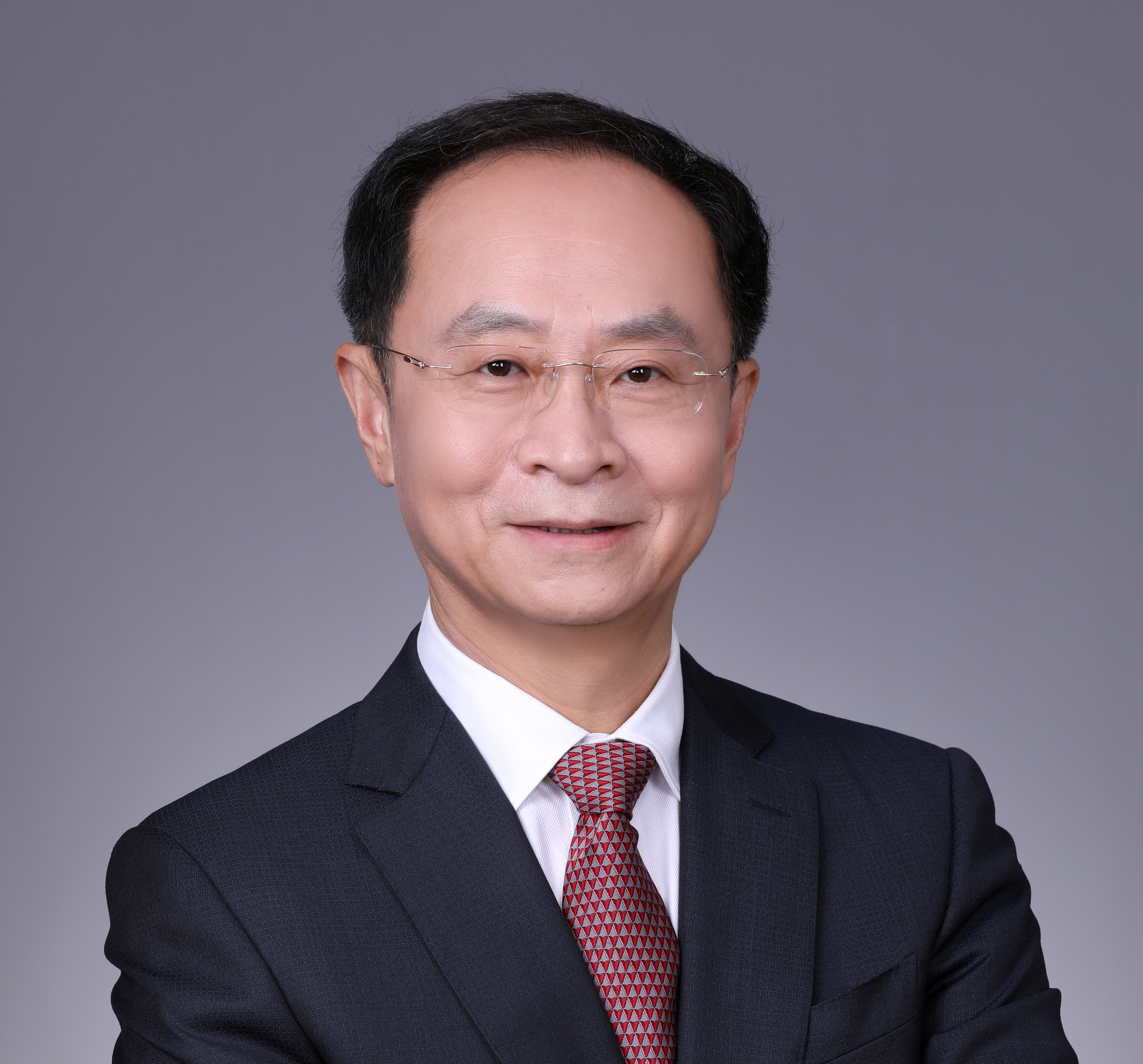
- Born: 1 July 1962 (age 63); Qingdao, Shandong
- Education: Chinese Academy of Sciences; Nankai University
- Known for: Founder of Wumart

Zhang Wenzhong
- Traditional Chinese: 張文中
- Simplified Chinese: 张文中
Transcriptions
Standard Mandarin
- Hanyu Pinyin: Zhāng Wénzhōng

Zhang Wenzhong (Chinese: 张文中; born 1 July 1962), also known as Daniel Zhang, is a Chinese scholar and businessman who is the founder of Wumart, and the chairman of the board at Dmall.

Zhang is also a life member of the Council of the Nankai University and a distinguished professor there. He previously did postdoctoral engineering researches at Stanford University.

== Early life and education ==
Zhang was born on July 1, 1962 in Jimo County (now Jimo District, Qingdao City). He earned a bachelor's degree of science in mathematics and master's degree in management from Nankai University. He graduated with a doctorate degree from the Institute of Systems Science of the Chinese Academy of Sciences. After that, he completed a postdoctoral fellowship at Stanford University School of Engineering.

== Career ==
In 1994, Zhang opened the first supermarket in Beijing under the name of Wumart Stores. It was listed on the Hong Kong Stock Exchange in 2003 and privatized in 2016.

Prior to founding Wumart, Zhang worked at the Development Research Center of the State Council of China, where he was engaged in macroeconomic research.

== Wrongful conviction ==
In 2006, Zhang was arrested based on unjust accusations. In 2008, the Hengshui Intermediate People's Court of Hebei province sentenced him to 18 years in prison on charges of misappropriation, bribery and fraud, and changed the verdict to 12 years for the final ruling in 2009. A total of RMB 52.1 million in fines was also ordered, which was a violation of personal and enterprise property rights.

While in prison, he refused to succumb to injustice and spent most of his time reading and researching. During that time he patented four of his own inventions, receiving one top prize and two first class scientific and technological progress awards at a provincial and ministerial level. He was granted early release.

On December 28, 2017, the Supreme People's Court announced a retrial for Zhang's case, followed by the work reports of the Supreme People's Court and Supreme People's Procuratorate delivered at the plenary session of 13th National People's Congress (NPC) in March 2018, that ruled his case as a wrongful conviction that is to be corrected to fully implement the property rights protection.

On May 31, 2018, his case was turned over by the Supreme Court of China. In its statement, the Supreme People's Court - after a final retrial - made the ruling that the original sentence was based on insufficient evidence and the laws applied were improper, quashing a guilty verdict for which he received an 18-year jail term ten years ago.

=== Timeline of Zhang's case ===
- Nov 12, 2006: Zhang Wenzhong investigated for graft by government authorities. Zhang later resigned from Wumei.
- Dec 25, 2007: Prosecutors in Hengshui, Hebei province, formally charged Zhang with fraud, embezzlement and bribery.
- Oct 9, 2008: The Hengshui Intermediate People's Court sentenced Zhang to 18 years in prison and impose a fine of 500,000 yuan ($78,038). Zhang appealed.
- March 30, 2009: The Hebei High People's Court made a final ruling on the appeal. Zhang sentenced to 12 years in prison for the three crimes, still with a fine of 500,000 yuan.
- Feb 6, 2013: Zhang was released from prison. Zhang twice received commutations.
- December 2015: The court in Hebei rejected Zhang's appeal.
- October 2016: Zhang appealed to the Supreme People's Court.
- Dec 27, 2017: The Supreme People's Court agreed to retry Zhang's case.
- Feb 12, 2018 The top court hears the case publicly.
- May 31: Zhang's is cleared about 10 years after being pronounced guilty by the first court.

== Address at the annual summit of China Entrepreneur Forum (CEF) ==
On February 28, he addressed the annual summit of China Entrepreneur Forum with the title Time Tries Devotion, Hearts Warm the World. His address won popular support nationwide. Part of the address was quoted in the media. "Although justice arrives late, shall it never be absent. Belated justice is still extremely precious." "I do not regret for maintaining my integrity, not compromising with my dignity and not breaching my own morality baseline." "Love shines in the world, Justice cherished in hearts, Kinship and friendship deep as ocean." "Spring blooms in heart, Life enlightens with sunshine".
