= Jingkelong =

Chinese supermarket chain

Beijing Jingkelong Supermarket Chain Company Limited
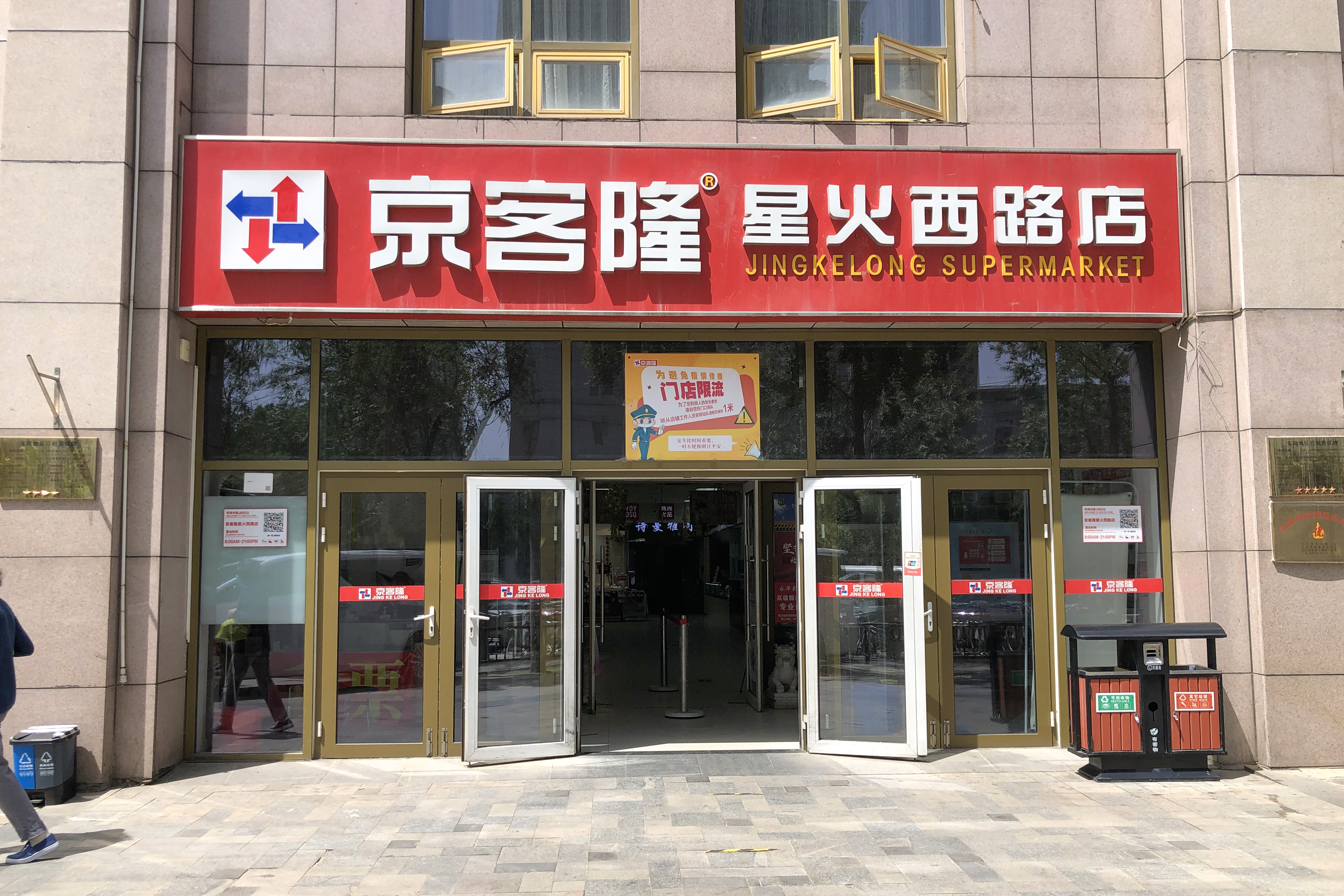
- Traditional Chinese: 北京京客隆商業集團股份有限公司
- Simplified Chinese: 北京京客隆商业集团股份有限公司
Transcriptions
Standard Mandarin
- Hanyu Pinyin: Běijīng Jīngkèlóng Shāngyè Jítuán Gǔfènyǒuxiàngōngsī

Beijing Jingkelong Supermarket Chain Company Limited or Jingkelong (JKL; Chinese: 京客隆; pinyin: Jīngkèlóng, SEHK: 814) is a Chinese supermarket chain headquartered in Chaoyang District, Beijing.

As of 2015, it operates 280 retail outlets; including hypermarkets, supermarkets, convenience stores, and shopping centers; in Beijing and in Langfang, Hebei. The chain operates retail centers in 16 districts and counties in Beijing and Langfang.

== History ==
Beijing Guandongdian Shangsha (北京关东店商厦) was established in 1994, and the first chain store, Jingkelong Jingsong Supermarket (京客隆劲松商城), opened in 1995. In 2002, Beijing Jingkelong Supermarket Chain Company Limited (北京京客隆超市连锁有限公司) was established, renaming itself to Beijing Jingkelong Supermarket Chain Group Company Limited (北京京客隆超市连锁集团有限公司) the same year. In 2004, the company renamed itself to Beijing Jingkelong Company Limited (北京京客隆商业集团股份有限公司) after reorganizing its assets.

In 2006 it made its second IPO attempt. Its first day of trading on the HKSE was September 25, 2006, and its shares went up 22% that day.

After its listing, it acquired eight stores from the Fulande retail chain. In 2007 it paid 50 million yuan to purchase an 11% stake in Shoulian and became 27th largest retailer in China.

== See also ==
- Wumart, one of Jingkelong's competitors
