= Li Jinyuan (businessman) =

Chinese businessman (born 1958)

- Born: Chinese: 李金元; 1958 (age 67–68); Cangzhou, Hebei
- Education: Nankai University
- Occupations: Founder, Chairman and CEO, Tiens Group
- Board member of: Tiens Group

Li Jinyuan (Chinese: 李金元; born 1958) is a Chinese businessman, investor, and philanthropist. He is the founder, chief executive, and chairman of Tiens Group, a direct seller of healthcare products. He was featured on Forbes' 2011 list of the world's billionaires as the 24th richest person in China at that time.

== Early life and education ==
Li Jinyuan was born in Cangzhou, Hebei Province, in 1958. He dropped out of school at the age of 14 and worked in an oilfield for two years before starting in business on his own account. He has an MBA from Nankai University.

== Career ==
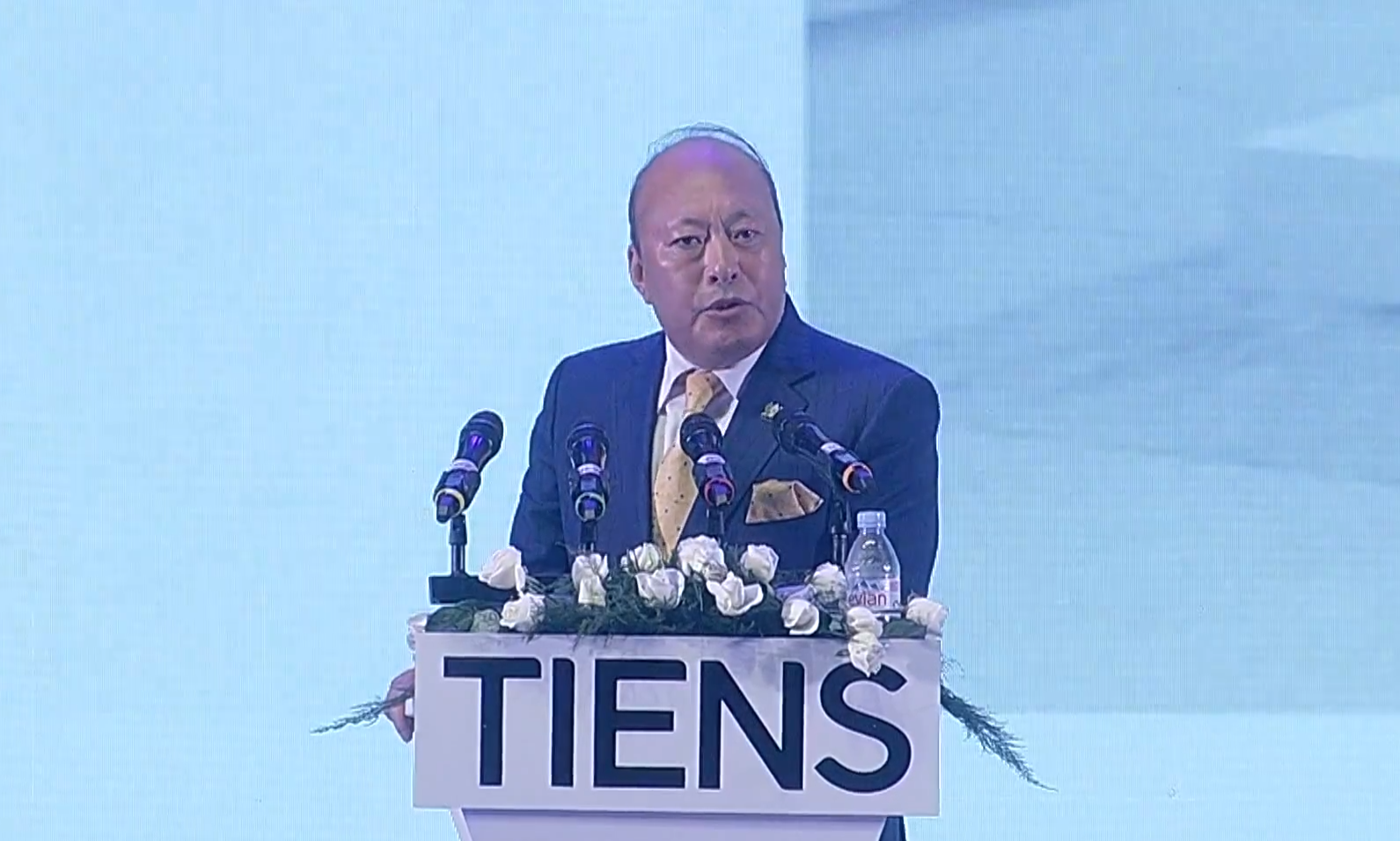
Li Jinyuan during a product launch in India 2018

Li founded Tiens Group, a direct seller of healthcare products, in Tianjin in 1995. It was reported in 2015 that the company had 12,000 employees. He is now chairman and chief executive.

In 2011, Forbes magazine estimated his wealth at $1.2B US, making him the 24th richest person in China at that time.

He received press attention in 2015 when he took 6,400 of his employees on holiday to France at a cost of £24m. Li was pictured greeting his employees at the opening parade standing in a United States Army jeep. The event required the booking of 140 hotels in Paris, and 7,600 tickets on France's high-speed TGV trains to transport his staff to the French coast where over 4,000 rooms were required in hotels in Monaco and Cannes. The visit was described by the International Business Times as an "expensive gesture" that demonstrated the "growing economic power of China".

== Philanthropy ==
According to Forbes, Li has created a Tiens Beijing International Charitable Foundation with an endowment of approximately $100 million and also provided $100 million to start a private school in Tianjin known as the Tianshi College which in 2011 enrolled over 3,000 students.

The Economic Times reported in 2016 that Li had "contributed generously to flood and tsunami-relief efforts and the fight against the SARS virus".
