= Nankai University =

Public university in Tianjin, China

Coordinates: 39°06′04″N 117°09′53″E

- 南开大学
- Motto: 允公允能，日新月异
- Motto in English: Dedication to Public Interests, Acquisition of All-round Capability, Aspiration for Progress with Each Passing Day
- Type: National, Public
- Established: 1919; 107 years ago
- President: Chen Yulu
- Faculty: 2,286
- Undergraduates: 17,339
- Postgraduates: 17,467
- Location: Tianjin, China
- Campus: Balitai, Jinnan, TEDA
- Website: nankai.edu.cn

Nankai University
- Simplified Chinese: 南开大学
- Traditional Chinese: 南開大學
Transcriptions
Standard Mandarin
- Hanyu Pinyin: Nánkāi Dàxué
- Wade–Giles: Nan2-k'ai1 Ta4-hsüeh2

Nankai University is a public research university in Tianjin, China. It is affiliated with the Ministry of Education of China. The university is part of Project 211, Project 985, and the Double First-Class Construction.

Nankai University was established in 1919 as the private Nankai School by Yan Xiu and Zhang Boling. During the Second Sino-Japanese War from 1937 to 1945, Nankai University, Peking University and Tsinghua University merged and formed the National Changsha Provisional University, which later moved to Kunming and was renamed the National Southwestern Associated University (西南联大). On December 25, 2000, the State Ministry of Education signed an agreement with Tianjin Municipal Government to jointly establish and develop Nankai University.

Nankai's alumni and faculty include the first Premier of the People's Republic of China Zhou Enlai, mathematician Shiing-Shen Chern and Nobel laureates Chen Ning Yang and Tsung-Dao Lee. Philosophy professor P.C. Chang was vice-chair of the UN committee that drafted the Universal Declaration of Human Rights.

== History ==
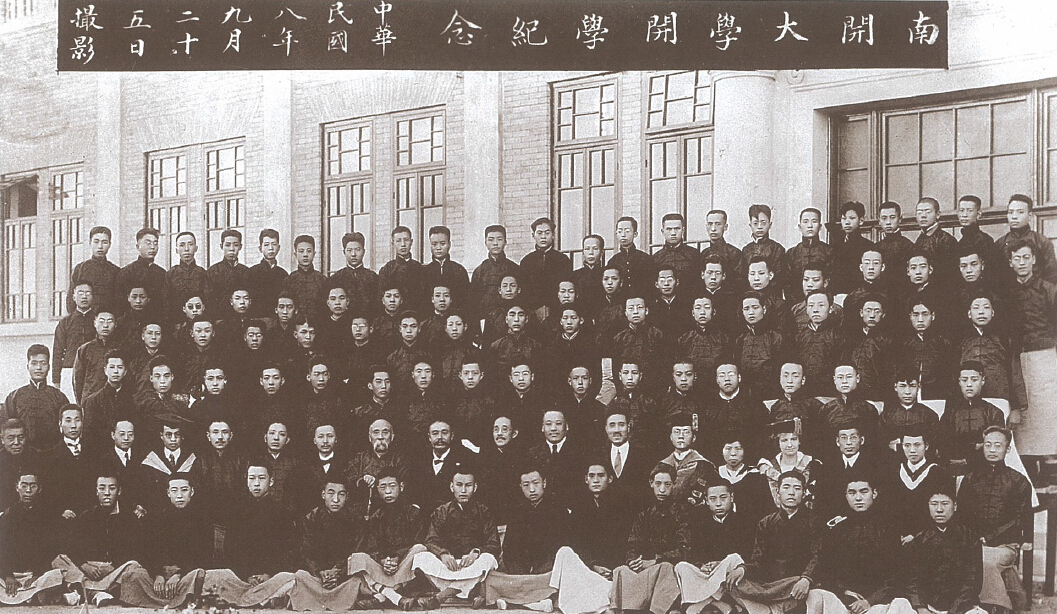
Students of Nankai University in 1919

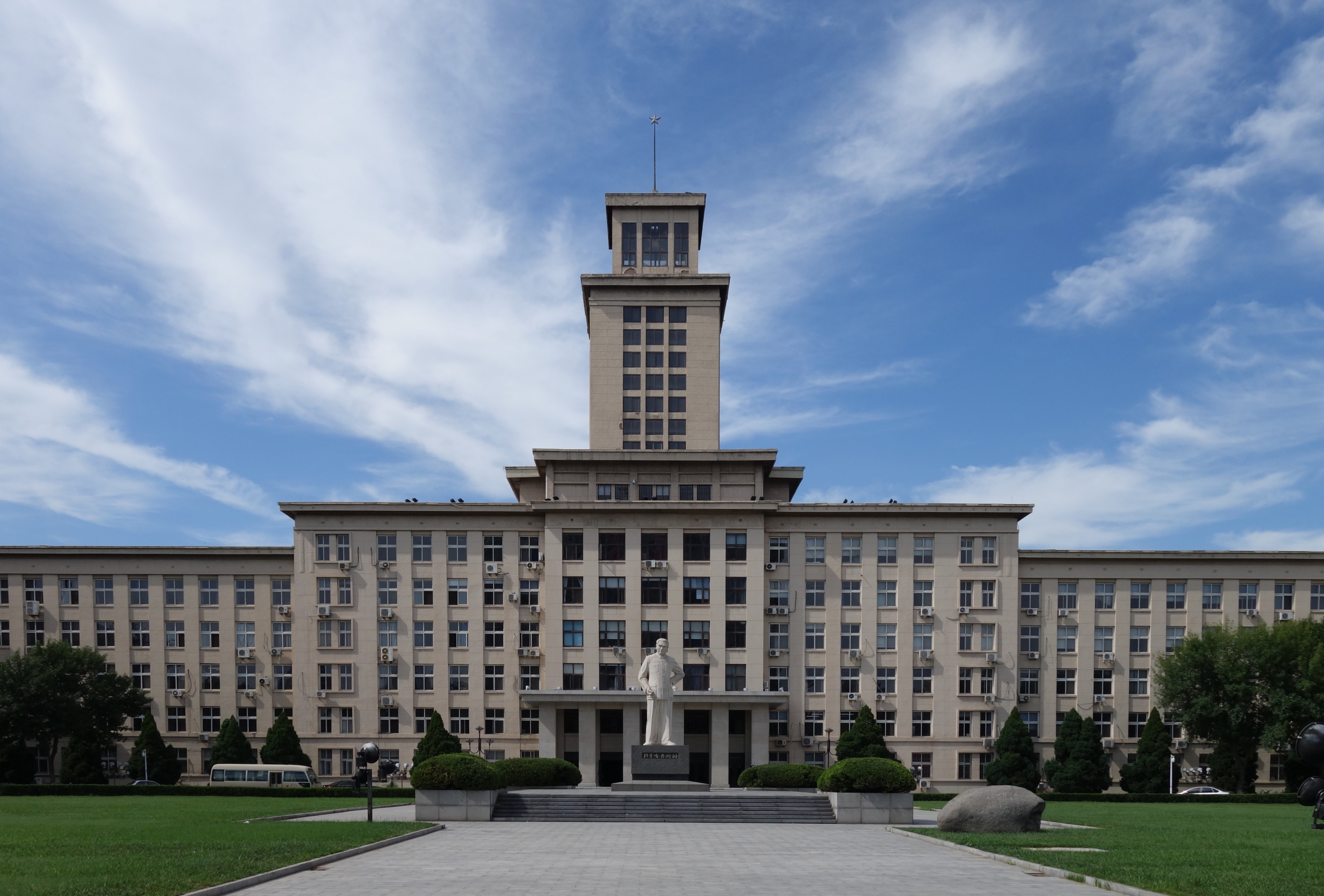
Main Building of Nankai University

=== 1919–1937 ===
The university was founded as a private institution in 1919. Nankai's scale was relatively small at its inception partly because it received no funding from the government but instead was funded by foreign charitable funds and local entrepreneurs, with only 3 departments (liberal arts, science, and business) and 96 students. It was noted particularly for its courses which were taught in English using foreign curricula and textbooks.

The well-known Nankai Institute of Economics was established in 1927 and soon became one of the most prominent in China being the first non-foreign entity to calculate a Chinese Consumer Price Index.

By 1937, Nankai had expanded into a university of 3 colleges, 13 departments, and 2 research institutes, with 429 students and 110 faculty and staff members.

It was once nicknamed "The North Star of Higher Learning".

=== 1937–1949 ===
In July 1937, during the Sino-Japanese War, Nankai campus was severely damaged by Japanese bombings. About two-thirds of Nankai's school buildings including its library were destroyed by the Japanese Imperial Army. A number of the school's artifacts, including the university bell, were looted and remain in Japanese museums till this day.

In August 1937, still during the Sino-Japanese War, Nankai University, Peking University and Tsinghua University united to form the National Changsha Provisional University, which later moved to Kunming and was renamed the National Southwestern Associated University. On April 2, it was renamed "National Southwestern Associated University. In 1946, after the war, Nankai returned to Tianjin and was reformed into a national university by the government. At that time, Nankai had four schools (Liberal Arts, Science, Political Science and Economics, and Engineering) and 16 departments.

=== 1949–1966 ===
After the establishment of the People's Republic of China, Nankai was readjusted and became a comprehensive university with emphasis on the arts and sciences, with 14 departments and 3 professional specialties in total.

=== 1966–1976 ===
From 1966 to 1976 the School's normal life was out of order due to the Cultural Revolution. In 1976 a catastrophic earthquake broke out in Tangshan, bordering Tianjin, causing damage of varying degrees to the School's buildings.

=== 1976–present ===
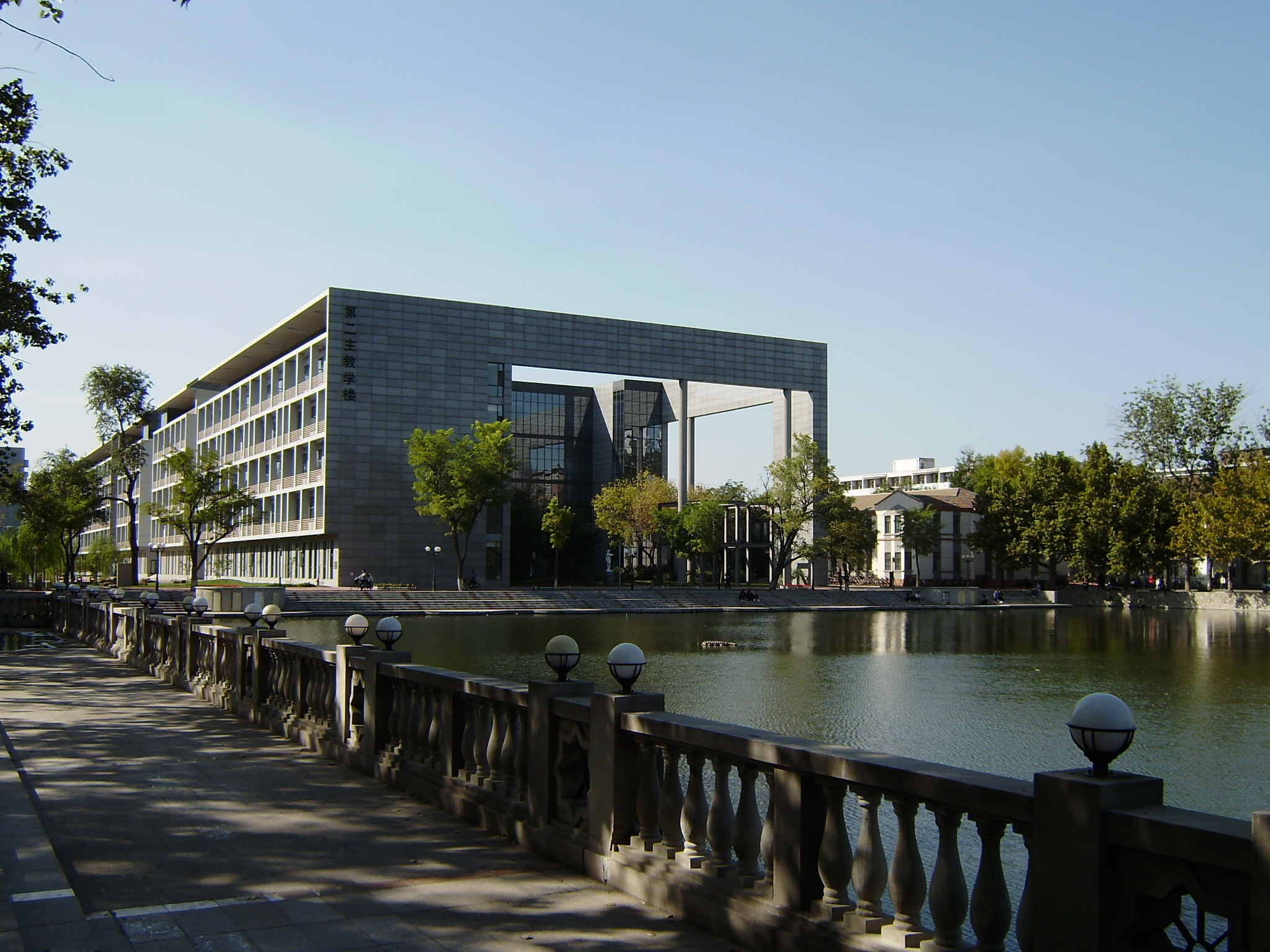
Second Main Building of Nankai University

In February 1978, the State Council decided to resume and set up national key colleges, Nankai University is identified as the first national key college.

After 1980, Nankai added a number of new specialties and institutes. In arts, applied specialties on financing were set up and the School of Economics was reopened in 1983, while in Sciences, interdisciplinary, marginal and high and new technological specialties were added.

"Nankai University has also been a destination for Indian students pursuing higher education in China, with many benefiting from international scholarship programs such as the Swami Vivekananda Scholarship, which promotes cultural and educational exchange between India and China.[34]"

Nankai was among the first universities in China to open its doors for students from America in the 1980s. In 1989, the university was ordered by the Tianjin public security bureau to send two Americans back home, following rising political tensions over pro-democracy demonstrations.

By the late 1980s, Nankai University had grown to be a comprehensive university embracing Humanities, Natural Sciences, Applied Sciences, Life Sciences, Managements and Art.

In 1994, Tianjin Foreign Trade College was merged to Nankai university. In 1999, under the combined efforts of Nankai and TEDA, TEDA College was set up. In 2000, the State Ministry of Education signed an agreement with Tianjin Municipal Government on jointly establishing and developing Nankai University. Experimental cooperation between Nankai University and Tianjin University was initiated on the principle of independent school-running and close cooperation. In 2002, under the cooperative efforts of Nankai, Government of Shenzhen and UC Berkeley, the Financial Engineering College was established in Shenzhen.

In May 2006, Nankai's president Rao Zihe tendered 15 of the 21 university's college dean positions, restaffing key positions in an effort to further improve the university's educational programs.

In February 2015, following Chinese media reports and statements from inside the Chinese Communist Party that universities would have to "be cleansed of liberal Western textbooks and other ideological heresies", Nankai's president Gong Ke publicly stated: "Recently I've read people on the Internet saying that the ranks of academics must be cleansed, purified and rectified. I can't agree with this. This was the mentality of 1957 or 1966." and "We cannot re-enact this history of "leftist" errors against intellectuals."

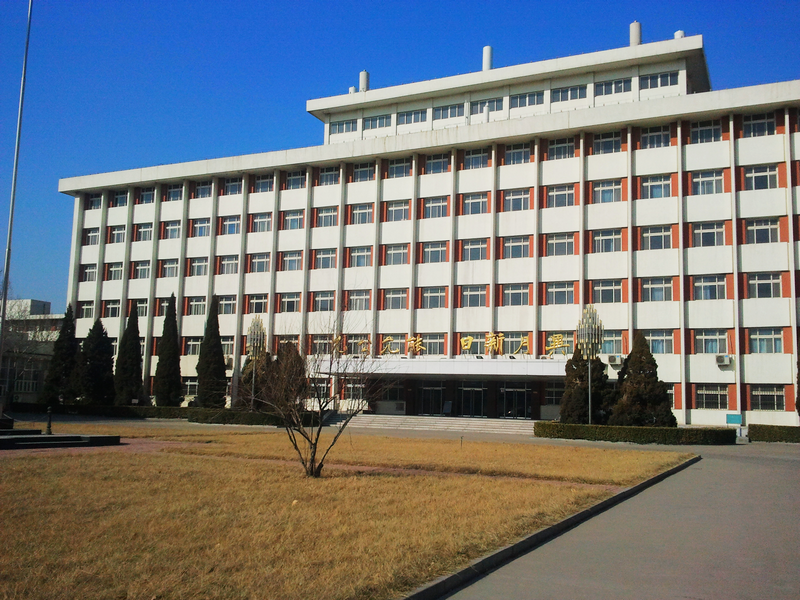
Nankai University Yingshuidao Campus

Nankai University TEDA college

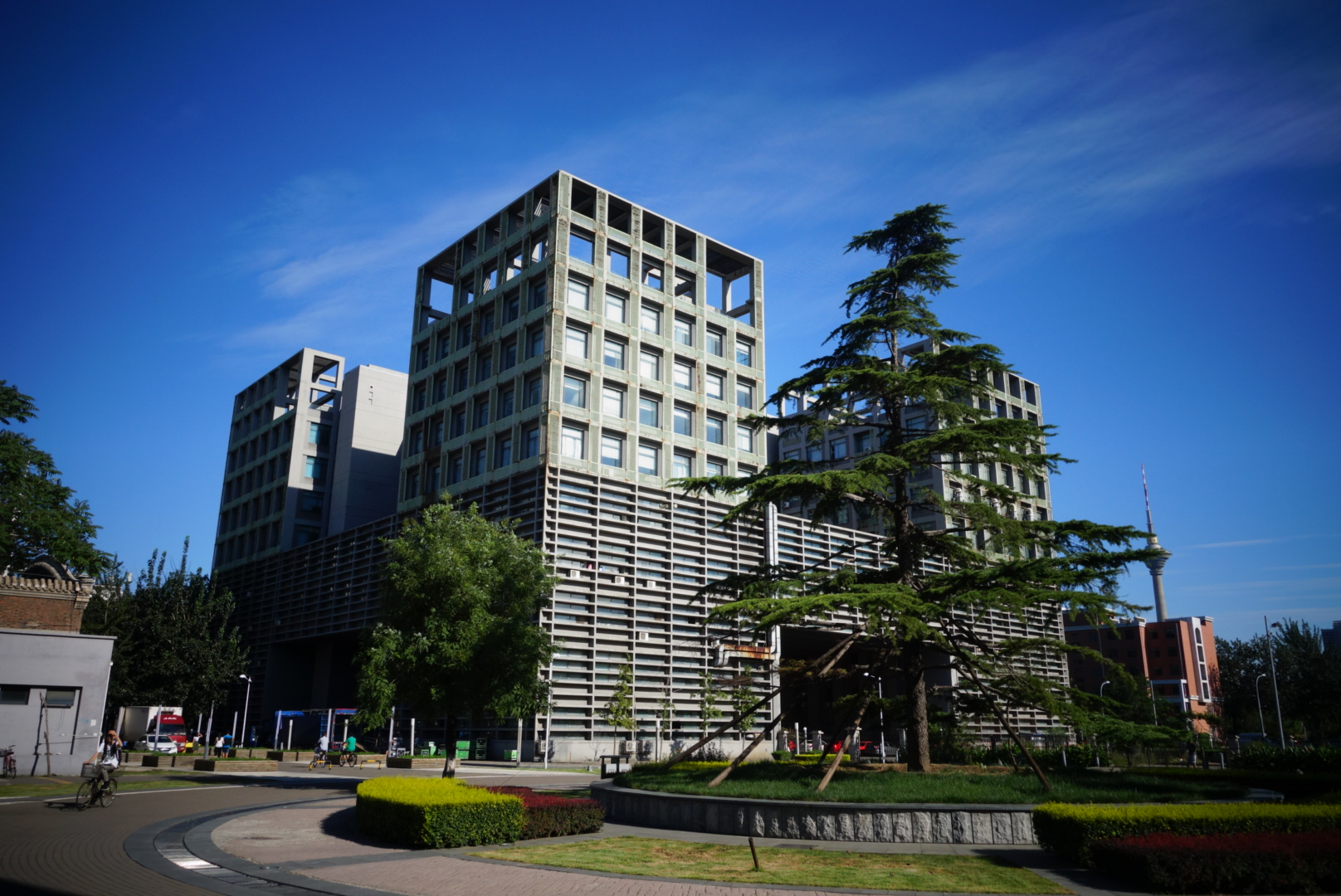
Joint Research Building of Tianjin University and Nankai University

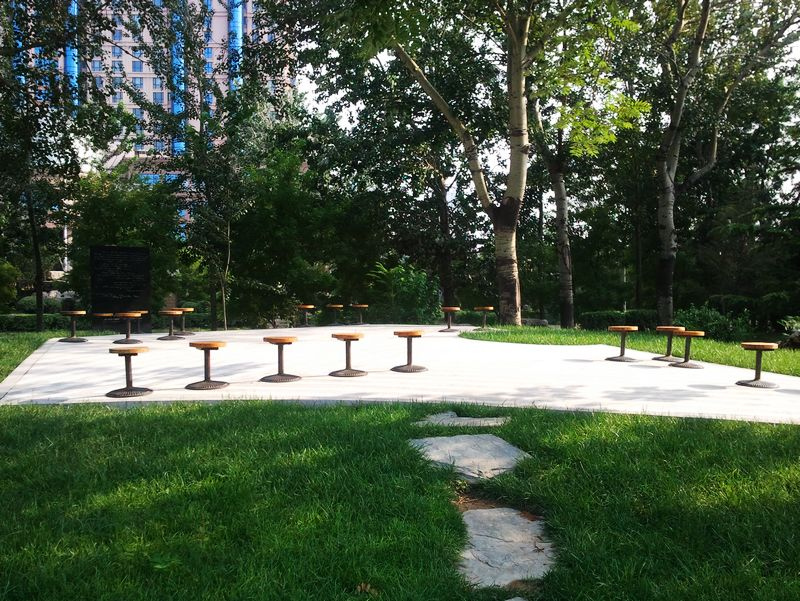
Cemetery of Shiing-shen Chern

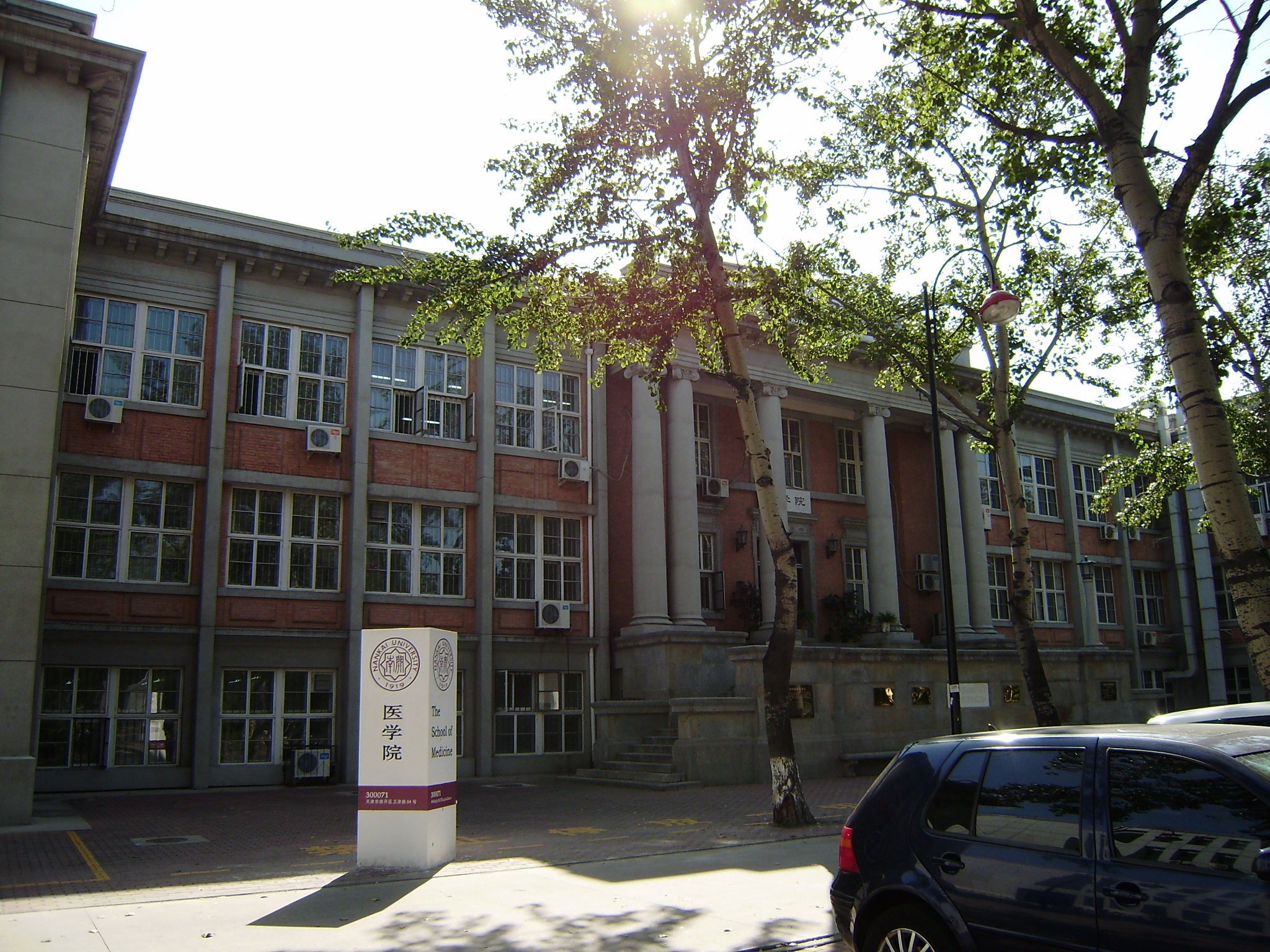
Siyuan building

== Campus ==
Nankai university encompasses three campuses. Balitai, Jinnan and TEDA. The total local campus area is 456.1 and the building area 136.8 hectare.

=== Balitai campus ===
Balitai was Nankai's first campus. established in 1919 and is located at Balitai in the Nankai district of Taijin. The campus hosts 10 colleges, namely the Business School, School of Economics, School of Literature, College of Chemistry, School of Mathematical Sciences, Institute of Physics, College of Foreign Languages, College of Life Sciences and Institute of Japan Studies.

=== Jinnan campus ===
Jinnan campus is the latest campus of Nankai university. It was opened in September 2015 and is located in the jinnan Area. The campus hosts 14 colleges, the Zhou Enlai School of Government, College of Tourism and Service Management, School of Medicine, College of Pharmacy, Law School, College of Chinese Language and Culture, Faculty of Philosophy, College of History, College of Computer and Control Engineering, College of Electronic Information and Optical Engineering, School of Material Science and Engineering, School of Finance and College of Software.

=== TEDA campus ===
TEDA campus is also located in the Binhai New Area and hosts the TEDA Institute of Biological Sciences and Biotechnology and the TEDA Institute of Applied Physics.

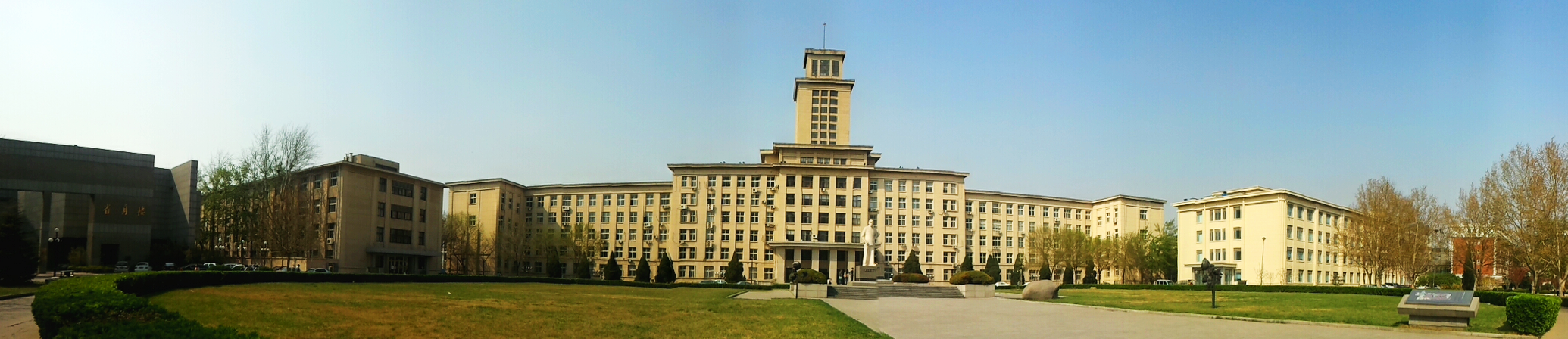
Main Building of Nankai University

== Academics ==
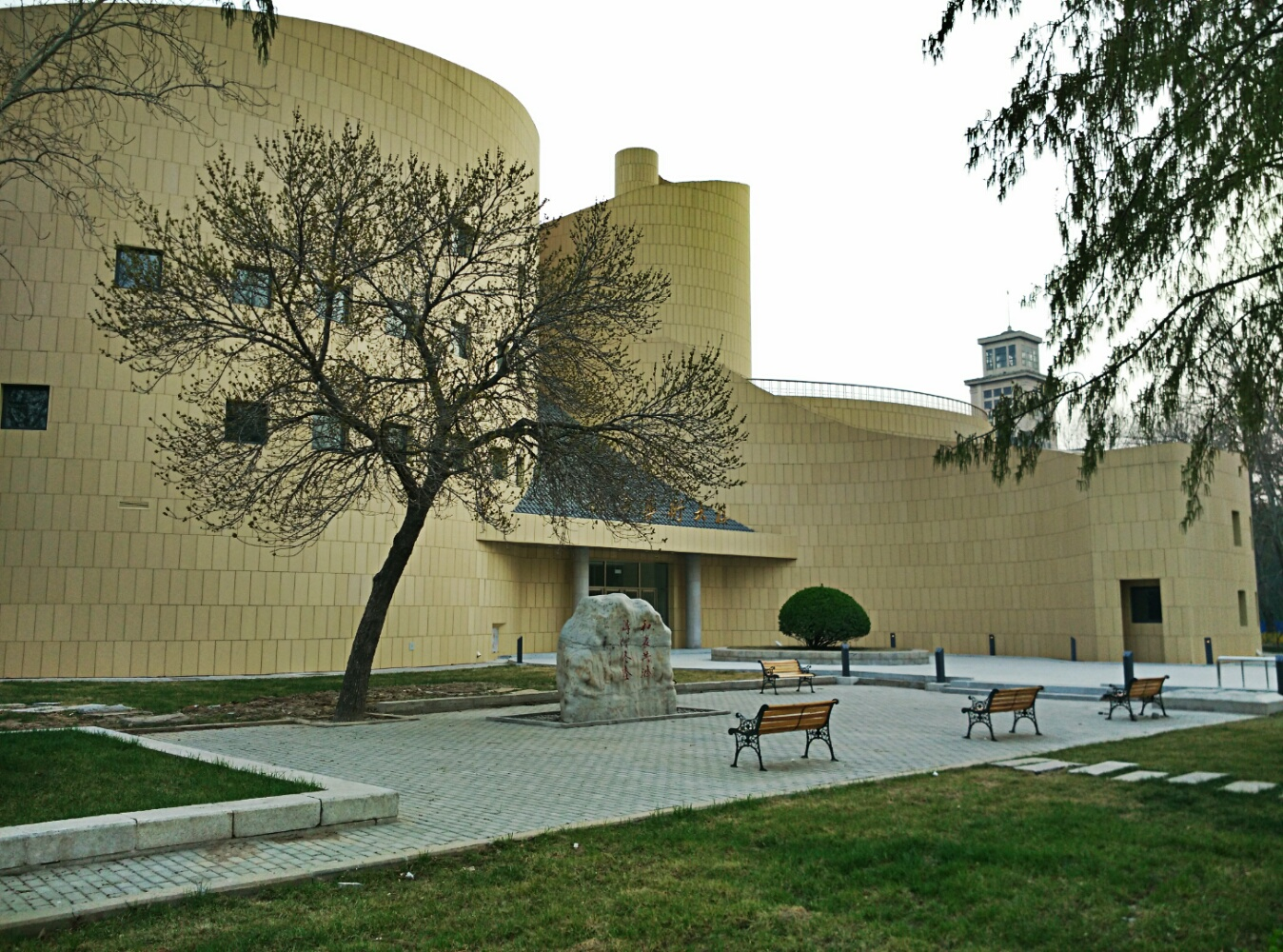
The Eastern Arts Building

Nankai is a multidisciplinary university under the jurisdiction of the Ministry of Education.

=== Teaching and learning ===
The university has academic programs that cover the humanities, natural sciences, technology, life sciences, medical sciences and the arts, with an equal balance between the sciences and the liberal arts.

Nankai's academic programs operate on a semester calendar, with two terms. The first beginning in early September and ending in early January and the second beginning in early February and ending in early July. Subsequently, winter break usually ranges from early January to early February and summer break from early July to early September.

Nankai, in 2013, had 22 colleges and schools, and offered 79 bachelor's degree programs, 231 master's degree programs, and 172 PhD programs. The total enrollment stood at approximately 12,000 undergraduate students and 11,000 graduate students. Of the total student population, 10% were international students from different countries around the world.

In 2018 the university offered a total of 80 undergraduate programs, 231 Master and 172 PhD programs and 28 post doctoral research stations. The total count of full-time students was 24,525. Academic staff consisted of 1,986 full-time teaching personnel, with 214 professors and 805 associate professors.

Nankai offers different scholarships, among them the Chinese Government Scholarship for international students, the CSC Scholarship for American Students, the Tianjin Government Scholarship, the Confucius Institute Scholarship and the Nankai University Scholarship.

Nankai also offers several scholarship programs to support international exchanges and hosts different international student exchange programs. Nankai's broad international programs are organized through the International Office. The university has established cooperations with more than 300 international universities and academic institutions, including programs like an Elementary School Chinese Program with schools in the US, which was launched in 2009. In 2010 the US-China exchange program Study International was launched, with the plan to send 100,000 American students to china in a four-year time frame. The first students were sent to Nankai university in the fall of 2010.

In 2012 Nankai was invited to become the 35th member of The Global University Leaders Forum (GULF), a global community of high-ranking universities, including renowned members like Yale University, Harvard University and the University of Oxford.

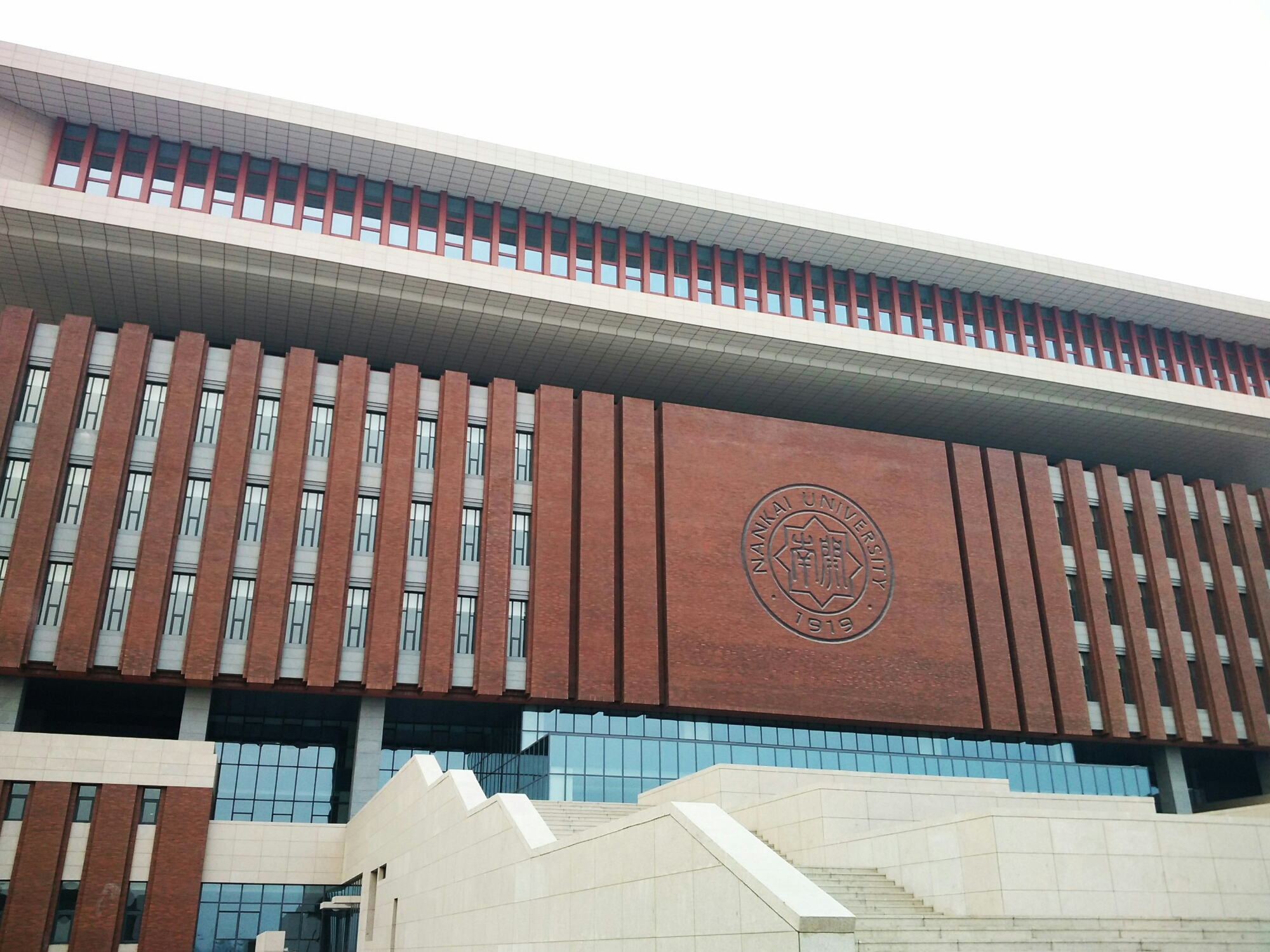
Nankai University Library (Central Library)

=== Research ===
The university has established broad international exchanges and collaborative relationships with more than 200 universities and academic institutions. Nobel Laureates Chen Ning Yang, Tsung-Dao Lee, Samuel Chao Chung Ting, Robert A. Mundell, and Reinhard Selten as well as former President of Korea Kim Dae Jung and former US Secretary of State Henry Kissinger were all conferred Honorary Professorships by Nankai University.

In November 2016, Robert F. Engle, who won the 2003 Nobel Prize in economics, became an honorary professor at Nankai.

Many other world-known scholars and entrepreneurs have been invited as Visiting Professors at Nankai University. Dr. Heng-Kang Sang returned from the United States to found the College of Economic and Social Development in 1987. Nankai University, a hotspot for talented mathematicians known both at home and abroad, has become one of the most famous centers for mathematics worldwide.

Nankai established nine Confucius Institutes around the world.

Scientists from Nankai have been involved in different scientific breakthroughs and important advancements.

== Rankings and reputation ==
University rankings
BCUR National	Domestic	23
Wu Shulian National	Domestic	25
CUAA National	Alumni	11
QS National	General	21
THE National	General	14–19
QS Asia (Asia version)	General	98
THE Asia (Asia version)	General	58
ARWU World	Research	101–150
QS World	General	=355
THE World	General	201–250
USNWR World	General	=166

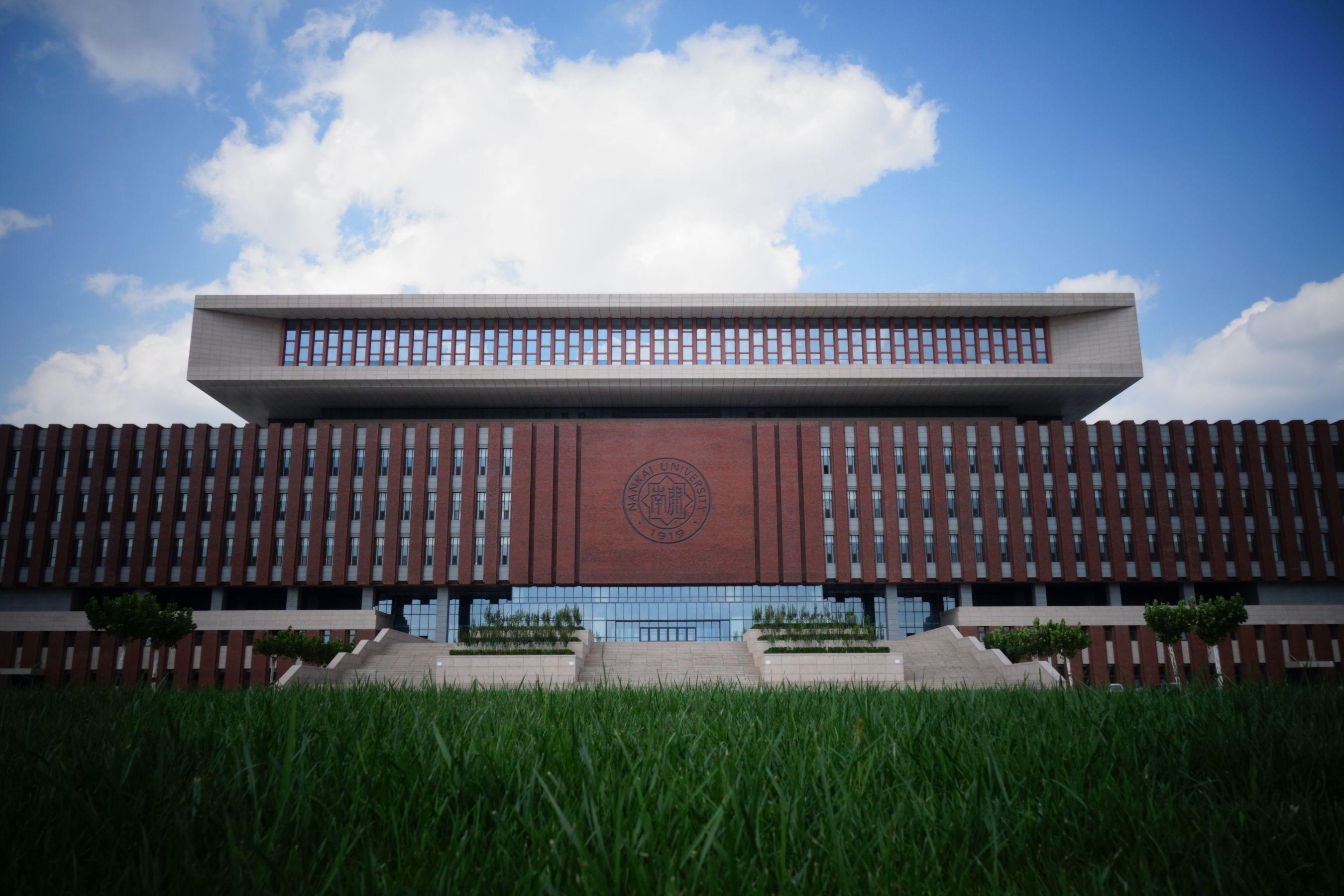
Nankai University Library (Central Library)

Nankai University is ranked among the top 10 universities in China, with exceptions in 2017 and 2018. In the ranking of top 50 universities in China published by Renmin University of China in June 2011, it was ranked 10th. In the Netbig ranking of 2011 it was ranked 10th as well. In the QS World University Rankings of 2013 it was ranked 62nd among Asian universities, and 11th in China. In the Chinese first-class university ranking of 2012 by Wu Shulian of China Management Academy, it was placed 8th. In the CWTS Leiden Ranking 2013, it was ranked 53rd among world universities, and 1st in China.

In the Nature Index Global 2025, it was ranked 16th among world universities, and 12th in China.

=== Department rankings ===
The university is also highly regarded for its top quality undergraduate programs. Nankai's mathematics, chemistry, history, business and economics programs are among the best in China.

Chern, Shiing-Shen established the world's largest mathematics institute (in terms of office area) in Nankai University.

== Student life ==
=== Student body ===
In 2018 Nankai enrolled 24,525 full-time students, with 13,067 undergraduate, 8,162 postgraduate and 3,296 PhD students. Of them 1,902 were international students.

== Colleges and schools ==
- Chern Institute of Mathematics
- College of Artificial Intelligence
- College of Chemistry
- College of Chinese Language and Culture
- College of Computer Sciences
- College of Cyber Sciences
- College of Economic and Social Development
- College of Electronic Information and Optical Engineering
- College of Environmental Science and Engineering
- College of Foreign Languages
- College of Life Sciences
- College of Pharmacy
- College of Philosophy
- College of Software
- College of Tourism and Service Management
- Faculty of History
- Institute of Finance and Development
- Institute of Japan Studies
- Nankai Business School
- School of Economics
- School of Finance
- School of International Education
- School of Journalism and Communication
- School of Law
- School of Literature
- School of Marxism
- School of Materials Science and Engineering
- School of Mathematical Sciences
- School of Medicine
- School of Physics
- School of Statistics and Data Science
- TEDA College
- TEDA Institute of Applied Physics Archived January 31, 2016, at the Wayback Machine
- TEDA Biotechnology School
- Zhou Enlai School of Government

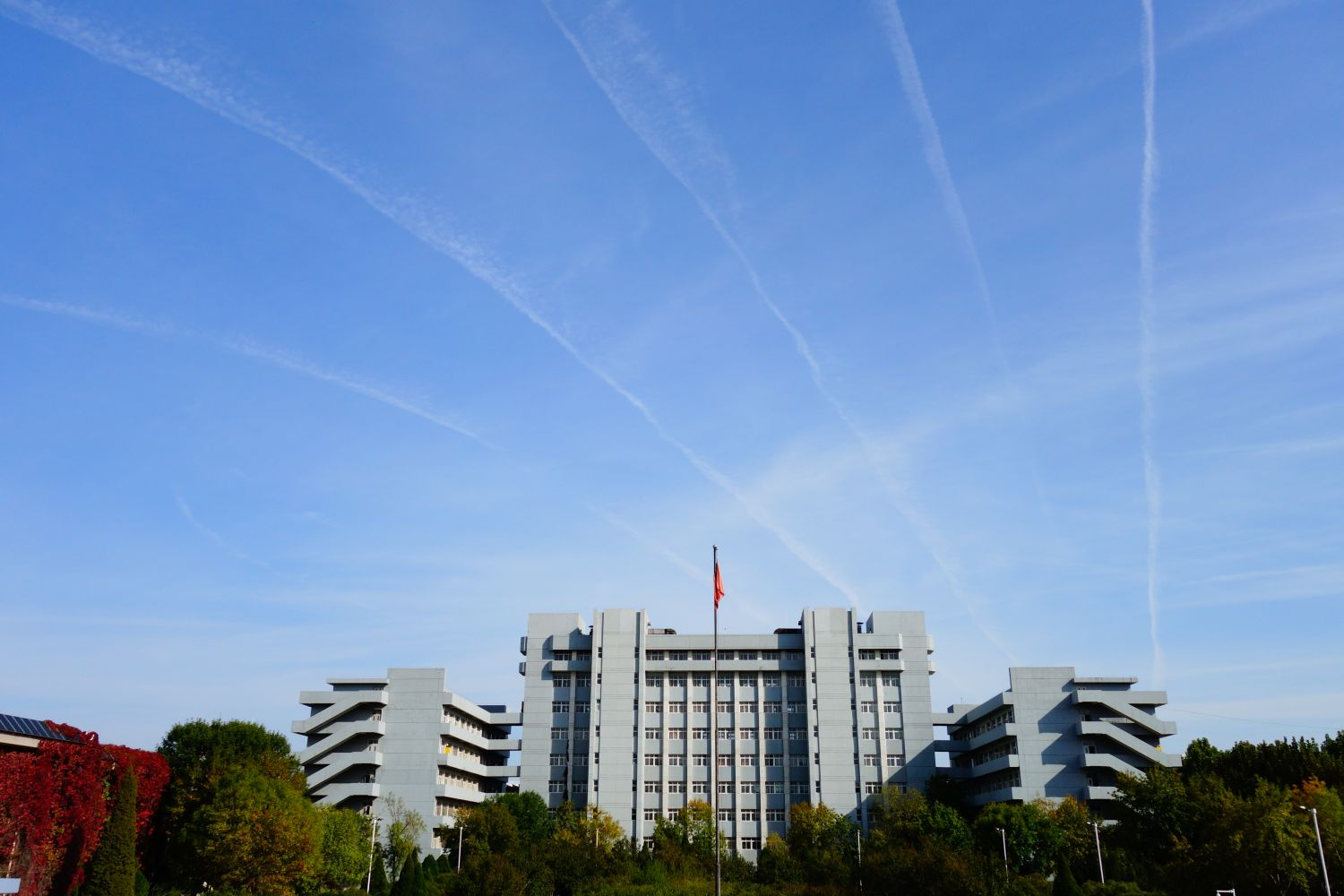
College of Chemistry

TEDA College

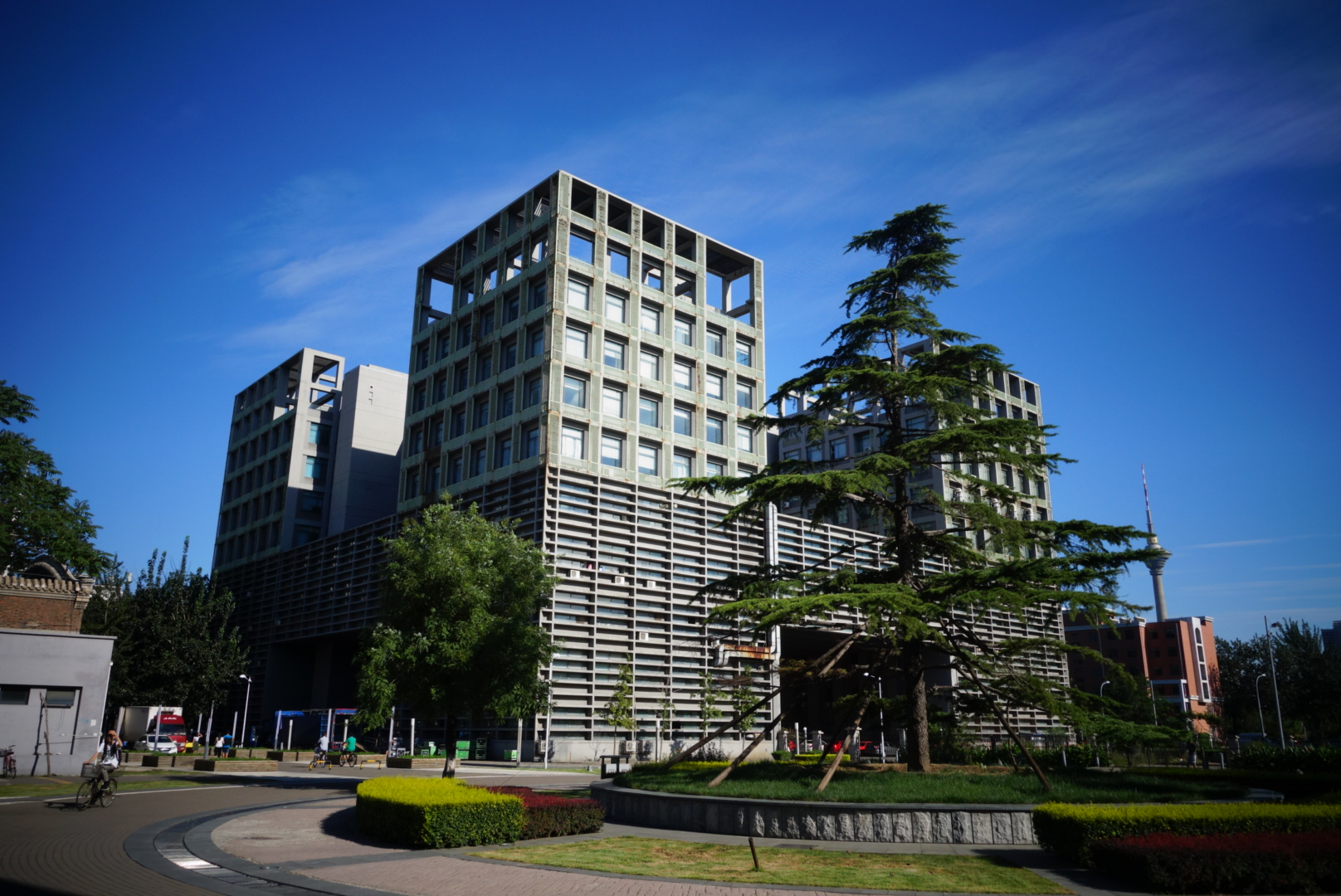
School of Medicine

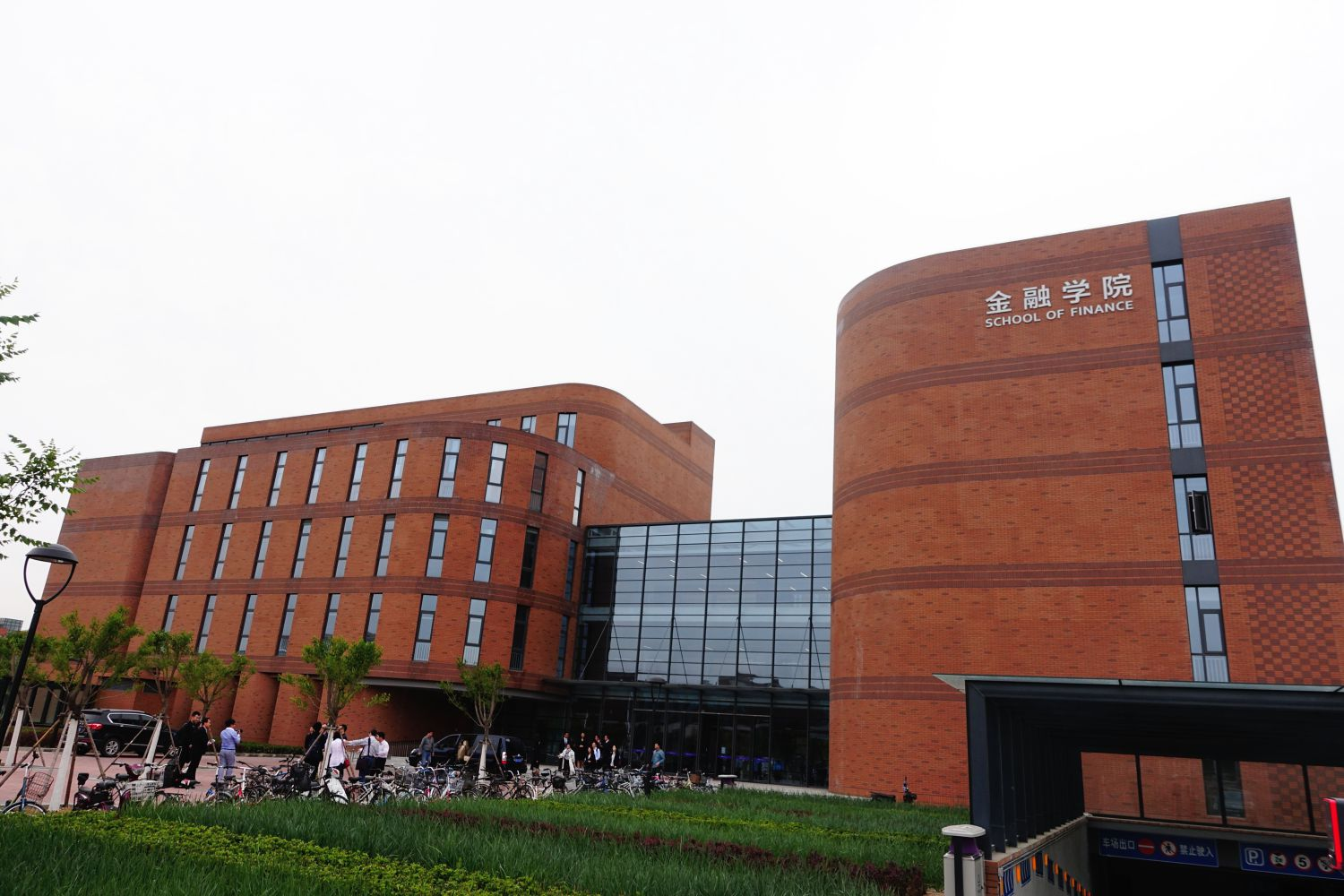
School of Finance

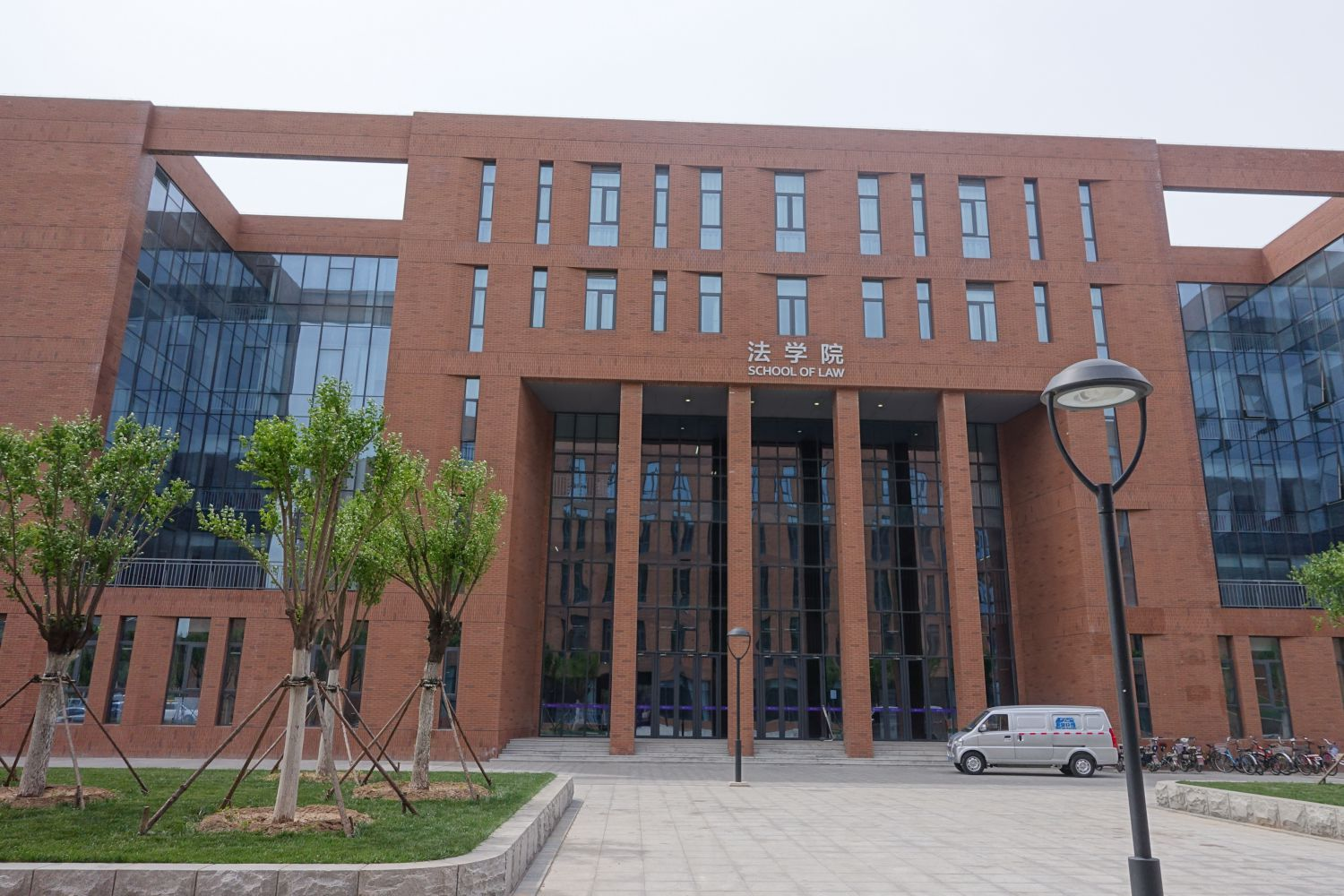
School of Law

== People ==
=== Presidents ===
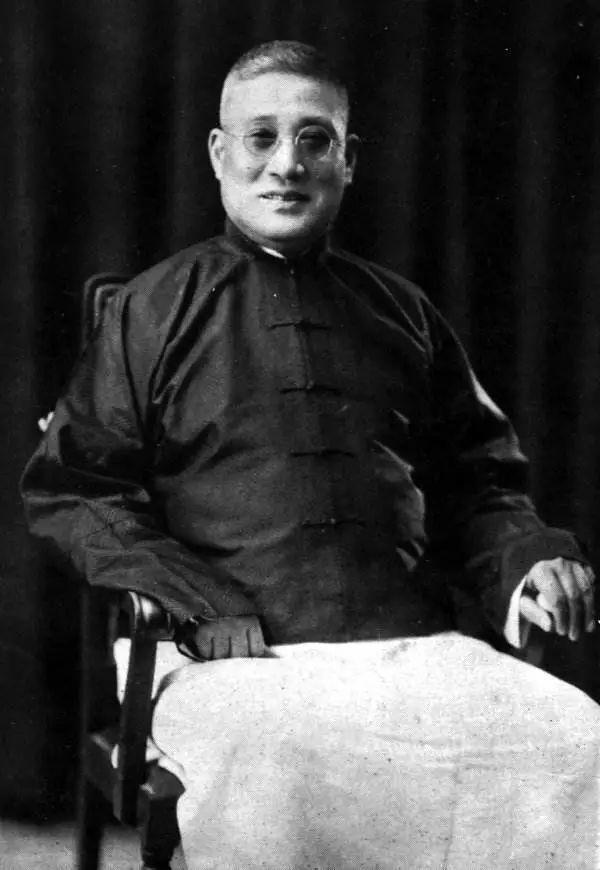
The universities first president Zhang Boling

- Zhang Boling: 1919–48
- He Lian: 1948–57 (acting)
- Yang Shixian: 1957–1969
- vacant due to the Cultural Revolution: 1969–1978
- Zang Boping (臧伯平): 1978
- Yang Shixian (second term): 1979–1981
- Teng Weizao: 1981–1986
- Mu Guoguang: 1986–1995
- Hou Zixin (侯自新): 1995–2006
- Rao Zihe: 2006–2011
- Gong Ke: 2011–2018
- Cao Xuetao: 2018–2022
- Chen Yulu: 2022–

=== Notable alumni ===
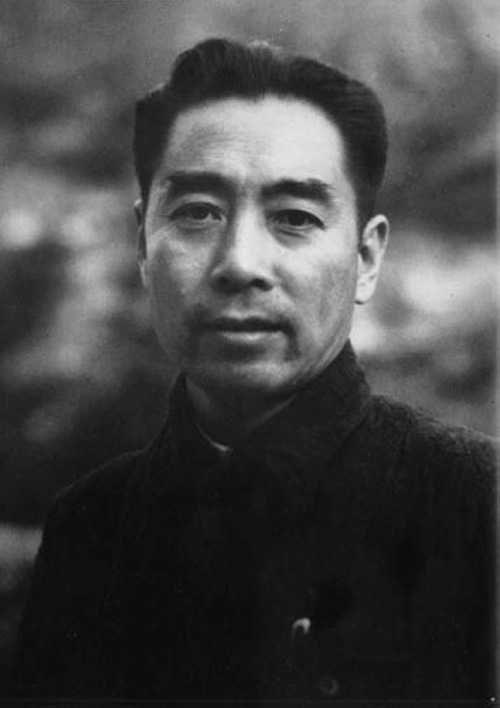
Zhou Enlai, first Premier of the People's Republic of China and student of the first ever class at Nankai in 1919

Notable alumni of Nankai university include

- Wang Anshun, politician and former mayor of Beijing
- Jerome Chen, Chinese-Canadian historian and fellow of the Royal Society of Canada
- Shiing-Shen Chern, mathematician
- Chow Chung-cheng, Chinese artist and author
- Zhou Enlai, politician and first Premier of the People's Republic of China
- Tsung-Dao Lee, Chinese-American physicist and winner of the Nobel Prize in Physics in 1957 (together with Chen-Ning Yang)
- Ray Huang, philosopher and historian
- Li Jinhua, diplomat and the first female spokesperson of the Ministry of Foreign Affairs of China
- Li Jinyuan, businessman and billionaire
- David X. Li, statistician
- Guo Shuqing, politician, banker and formerly served as the Governor and Deputy Party Secretary of Shandong, chairman of the China Securities Regulatory Commission (CSRC)
- Wu Ta-You, atomic and nuclear theoretical physicist who worked in the United States, Canada, mainland China and Taiwan and has been dubbed the "Father of Chinese Physics"
- Zhang Wenzhong, businessman and scholar
- Liu Xinyuan, molecular biologist
- Ren Xuefeng, politician and business executive who served as the Communist Party Secretary of Guangzhou and the Deputy Communist Party Secretary of Guangdong
- Cao Yu, playwright
- Chen-Ning Yang, physicist and winner of the Nobel Prize in Physics in 1957 (together with Tsung-Dao Lee)
- Dou Yupei, politician and former Vice Minister of Civil Affairs
- Xiaowen Zeng, Chinese-Canadian author
- Zhang Yiming, businessman, founder and former CEO of ByteDance

A more extensive list of Nankai alumni can be found here.

== See also ==
- Tsin Ku University
