= Dou Yupei =

Chinese politician

- 窦玉沛

Vice Minister of Civil Affairs
- In office January 2006 – November 2016
- Premier: Wen Jiabao; Li Keqiang

Personal details
- Born: September 1957 (age 69) Tianjin, China
- Party: Chinese Communist Party
- Education: Nankai University

Dou Yupei (Chinese: 窦玉沛; pinyin: Dòu Yùpèi; born September 1957) is a former Chinese politician, and Vice Minister of Civil Affairs. He was dismissed from his position in January 2017 for an investigation by the Central Commission for Discipline Inspection.

== Early life and education ==
Dou Yupei was born in Tianjin. He joined the Chinese Communist Party in 1982 and graduated from Nankai University.

== Career ==
In 1990, Dou served as the director of Resettlement Office of the Ministry of Civil Affairs, and was appointed as the director of the Department of Social Affairs in 1996.

In 2003 he became the director of the Office of Ministry of Civil Affairs, and was promoted to the Vice Minister from 2006 to 2016.

In 2009, he was appointed as the Vice President of the Red Cross Society of China until 2015.

== Investigation ==
On January 9, 2017, Dou Yupei was investigated by the Central Commission for Discipline Inspection, according to the news conference statement.

On February 8, 2017, Dou was given a serious warning and ordered to retire early.

Political offices
Preceded by Li Xueju	Minister of Civil Affairs of China; June 2010 – November 2016	Succeeded by Huang Shuxian
