= Tiens Group =

Chinese multinational conglomerate

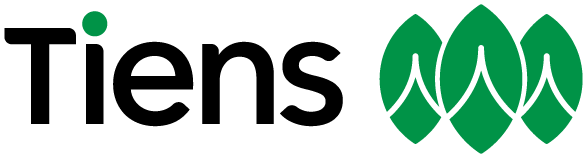
- Company type: Private
- Industry: Multi-level marketing company
- Founded: 1995; 31 years ago
- Founder: Li Jinyuan
- Headquarters: Tianjin, China
- Key people: Li Jinyuan (Chairman) and (CEO)
- Products: Dietary supplements
- Subsidiaries: Tianjin Tianshi Biological Development Co., Ltd. Tiens Yihai Co. Ltd.
- Website: www.tiens.com

Tiens Group (/ˈtiːɛns/, from Chinese: 天狮; pinyin: Tiānshī; lit. 'heavenly lion') is a Chinese multinational conglomerate and direct selling company headquartered in Tianjin, China. It has 126 branches in 111 countries around the world. The head of the company is Li Jinyuan, a Chinese businessman, investor, and philanthropist.

The main products are dietary supplements and massagers. Sales of goods occur through a network marketing system, distribution networks of the office-warehouse system, as well as through online stores. The company has been certified according to Good manufacturing practice requirements in China, and possesses a set of certificates and permissions in other countries.

== History ==
Tiens Group was founded in 1995 by Li Jinyuan. Tiens entered the international market in 1997. The company's initial product offerings included traditional Chinese medicinal products, calcium tablets, and instant coffee. In 2008, they reported having 12 million MLM distributors worldwide, including more than 40,000 in Germany, and 40 million customers, mostly in Russia, with approximately 60,000 in Germany. In 2014, they reported having 200,000 distributors in Uganda. The company also has market partners in Indonesia, Hungary and Kazakhstan.

The base company's products are dietary supplements and massagers. The company's production facilities are located in the Tianjin New Technology Industrial Park. Sales of goods occur through a network marketing system, distribution networks of the office-warehouse system, as well as through online stores.

The group is represented by the following companies: Tiens Biotech Group, Inc. (USA, Delaware); Tianjin Tianshi Group Co., LTD (PRC); Tianshi International Holdings Group Ltd. (British Virgin Islands); Tianjin Tianshi Biological Engineering Co. Ltd (PRC); Tianjin Tianshi Pharmaceuticals Co., Ltd (PRC); Tianjin Tianshi Life Resources Co., Ltd (PRC); Tianjin Tianshi Biological Development Co., Ltd (PRC); Tiens Yihai Co., Ltd (PRC).

The corporation's headquarters is located in the Henderson Center in Beijing. The main production areas, measuring more than 0.26 km^{2}, are located in the Wuqin New Technology Introduction Zone of Tianjin city. The company also operates a manufacturing facility in Vietnam.

The company has established long-term partnerships with such worldwide companies as L'Oreal, Pfizer Pharmaceuticals and Shiseido.

To promote its products, the company establish contracts with mass sports athletes from different countries, whom it calls "ambassadors". Over 50 sportsmen are involved. Among them are Uzbekistani gymnast Oksana Chusovitina, Russian athletes Alexandra Trusova and Varvara Subbotina.

In Russia, Tiens Group has been engaged in direct sales since 2010. As of the beginning of 2023, Russia-based OOO "Tianshi" has 8 of its own divisions in Moscow, Yekaterinburg, Irkutsk, Krasnodar, Kazan, Novosibirsk, St. Petersburg, Ufa, as well as about 80 partner offices in different regions. According to a company representative, about 10 thousand independent distributors are involved in direct sales of the company's products in Russia, and the number of regular customers is about 120 thousand. The company cooperates with several Russian industries. In 2022, the company announced that it would invest $500 thousand in the search and development of local production facilities in Russia.

== Charities and actions ==
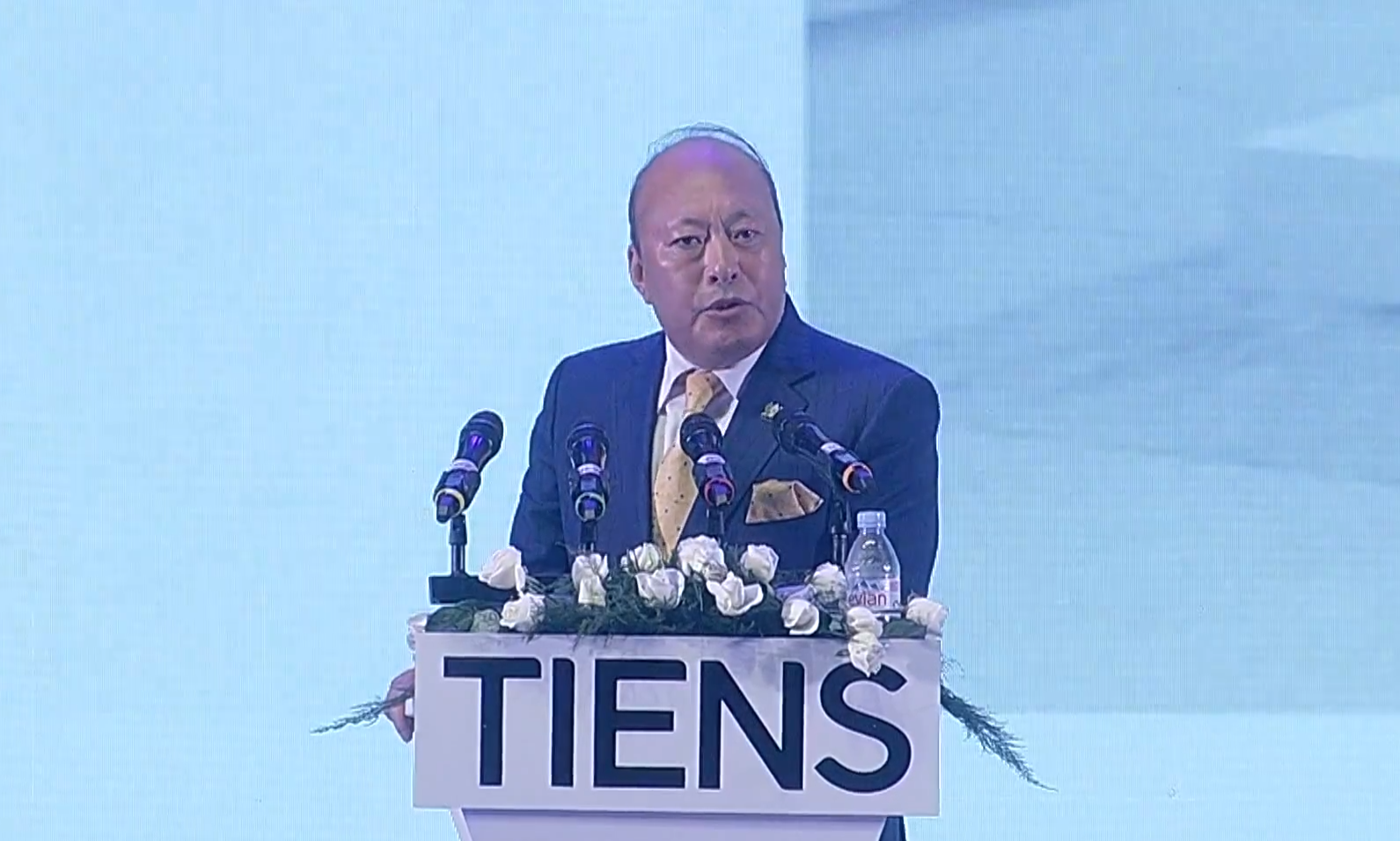
Company's head Li Jinyuan during a product launch in India 2018

The founder and chairman of the board of the company, Li Jinyuan, according to Forbes, is an active philanthropist who donates money to social projects. He founded the Tiens Meijing International Charitable Foundation, into which Li Jinyuan invested about 100 million of US dollars. He also committed $100 million to establish Tianshi College in China (in 1999), a state-approved educational foundation in Tianjin city with a capacity of 3,400 students. In 2016, The Economic Times newspaper indicated that Li Jinyuan allocates large sums to help victims of tsunamis and earthquakes, as well as to combat the SARS virus.

Company employees also massively participate in charity initiatives. E. g. in 2023 Tiens workers in 36 countries collected over $200,000 to help to those suffered from 2023 Turkey–Syria earthquakes.

In May 2015, the company sent 6,400 employees on a four-day tour of France. While in Nice, they set a Guinness World Record for the longest "human-made phrase".

== Controversies ==
=== United States ===
In September 2016, the FDA issued an advisory letter warning them that their claim of treating or preventing "asthma, cancer, rheumatism, diabetes, cardiovascular diseases, myocardial infarction, stroke, sexually transmitted diseases (e.g., herpes), cerebral embolism, and dementia" violates the Federal Food, Drug, and Cosmetic Act. As of December 2022, the FDA still lists Tiens products among "Products Illegally Marketed for Serious Diseases". These include TIENS Super Calcium with Lecithin, TIENS Selenium Supplement, TIENS Natto Ginkgo, TIENS Cell Rejuvenation Yi Kang, TIENS Cordyceps, and TIENS Wei Kang Vitality.

=== Uganda ===
According to an article in The Guardian, in Uganda, the company's "food supplements" are being touted as cures for everything from cancer and HIV to hernias, tumors, and appendicitis. The report claims that the company is a pyramid Scheme, where most of the money is generated from joining fees of new recruits.
