= Jerome Ch'en =

Chinese-Canadian historian (1919–2019)

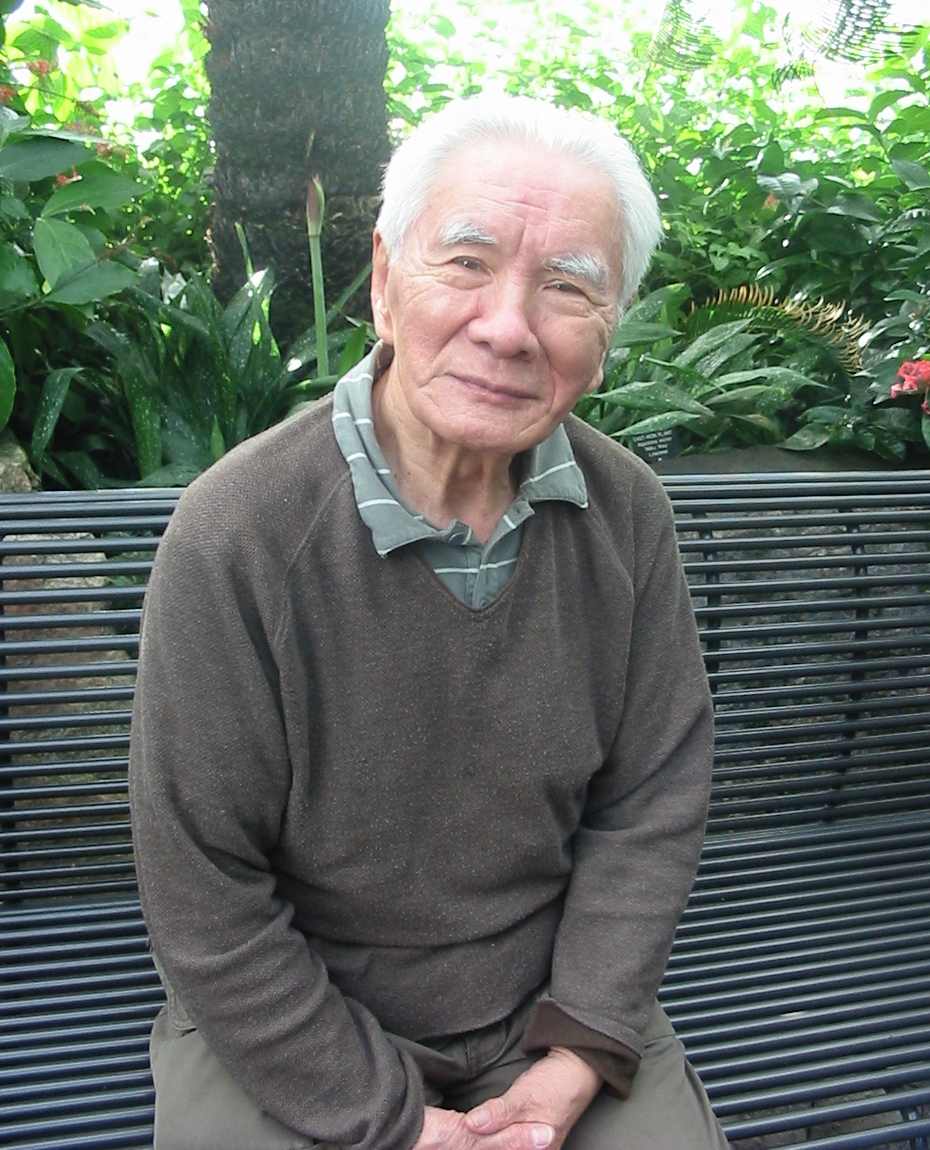
- Jerome Chen in 2003
- Traditional Chinese: 陳志讓
- Simplified Chinese: 陈志让
Transcriptions
Standard Mandarin
- Hanyu Pinyin: Chén Zhìràng
- Wade–Giles: Ch'en Chih-jang

Jerome Chih-jang Ch'en FRSC (Chinese: 陳志讓; pinyin: Chén Zhìràng; October 2, 1919 – June 17, 2019) was a Chinese-Canadian historian.

== Early life and education ==
Ch'en was born as Ch'en Chih-jang in Chengdu, Sichuan, Republic of China in October 1919. He was educated at Tianjin Nankai University, National Southwestern Associated University in Kunming during the Second Sino-Japanese War and at the London School of Economics (LSE), which he attended funded by a Boxer Indemnity Scholarship and where he studied under Friedrich Hayek.

== Academic career ==
In the 1950s, Ch'en worked for the Chinese Service of the BBC. Before emigrating to Canada he was a Reader in history at the University of Leeds for a number of years. He was Professor of Chinese History at York University in Toronto, Canada from 1971 to 1987. He was the director of the University of Toronto/York University Joint Centre of Asia Pacific Studies (JCAPS) from 1983 to 1985.

== Honours ==
Ch'en was made a Fellow of the Royal Society of Canada in 1981. In 1984, he was named Distinguished Research Professor at York.

== Death ==
Ch'en died in St. Catharines, Ontario, Canada in June 2019 at the age of 99.

== Selected publications ==
- Yuan Shih-ka̕i, 1859-1916: Brutus Assumes the Purple (George Allen & Unwin, 1961).
- The Highlanders of Central China: a History 1895 – 1937
- Mao and the Chinese Revolution
- The Military-Gentry coalition—the Warlords Period in Modern Chinese History
- China and the West: Society and Culture 1815 – 1937 (Hutchinson, 1979)

Ch'en also edited:

- Great Lives Observed: Mao

Some of his works have been translated into Chinese or Japanese.
