= 國光 =

國光 or 国光, meaning 'light of country', may refer to:

- Guoguang, Chinese transliteration
- Kunimitsu, Japanese given name
