= David Chong =

David Chong Kok Kong (simplified Chinese: 张国光; traditional Chinese: 張國光; pinyin: Zhāng Guó Guāng) is a lawyer and business owner. Chong is the founder and president of the Portcullis Group, which provides wealth advisory services. He is the executive chairman of Fusang – the Asian Family Office, owned by his family.

== Law career ==
Chong is a director of David Chong Law Corporation, Singapore. Chong is a qualified barrister in the United Kingdom. He is also an advocate and solicitor, Singapore; Malaysia and Brunei; barrister and solicitor in British Virgin Islands, Australia; solicitor in New South Wales and Queensland, Australia.

== Wealth advisory career ==
Chong is the founder of Portcullis Group services. In 2013, Chong's Portcullis TrustNet firm came under the spotlight as the International Consortium of Investigative Journalists (ICIJ) identified the company as a wealth management firm that uses that offshore loopholes for wealthy individuals to evade tax. The allegations surfaced as an independent contractor leaked its clients' data to the ICIJ.

David Chong also owns Lintel Securities and the Fusang Group of companies.

== Other appointments ==
Chong is the President of the Singapore Trustees Association (STA). He served as the Founding President of Society of Trust & Estate Practitioners (STEP) Singapore Branch, and was the Founding President of the Singapore Fund Administrators Association (SFAA). He also sits on the Investment Committee of the Singapore Academy of Law.

He is a fellow of Harris Manchester College, Oxford, where he sits on the Board of Regents. Chong is Vice Chair of the United World College of South-East Asia Foundation, and sits on the Board of NUS High School of Math and Science. In appreciation for his dedicated service to education, the Singapore Ministry of Education presented Chong with a Service to Education Award in 2013.

He also founded Oyster Security Pte Ltd whose primary role is to safeguard the Portcullis group of companies against technology risks and threats.
