= Phoon Kok Kwang =

Singaporean civil engineer

Phoon Kok Kwang (Chinese: 方國光; pinyin: Fāng Guóguāng) is a Singaporean civil engineer and the current president of Singapore University of Technology and Design. Phoon was formerlly the senior Vice Provost (Academic Affairs) at National University of Singapore and was the founding editor-in-chief of the Taylor & Francis journal Georisk. He is also a Fellow of the American Society of Civil Engineers. He was also previously the Kwang-Hua Professor at Tongji University.

In 2017, Phoon received the Humboldt Prize.
