= Kunimitsu =

Kunimitsu is a masculine Japanese given name. Notable people with the name include:

- Kunimitsu Itō (伊藤 国光, born 1955), Japanese long-distance runner
- Kunimitsu Takahashi (高橋 国光, born 1940), Japanese Grand Prix motorcycle road racer and racing driver
- Shintōgo Kunimitsu (新藤五 国光), a Japanese swordsmith during the Einin, Shōwa and Enkyō periods
- Kunimitsu Sekiguchi (関口 訓充, born 1985), Japanese football player

== Fictional Characters ==
- Kunimitsu (Tekken) (州光), a playable character in the Tekken fighting games
- Kunimitsu Tezuka (手塚 国光), a character in The Prince of Tennis series
