= Mu Guoguang =

Opticist and educator

- 母国光
- Born: 1931; Jinxi, Liaoning, China
- Died: 2012 (aged 80–81); Tianjin, China
- Resting place: Tianjin, China
- Education: Nankai University
- Scientific career
- Fields: Optics
- Workplaces: Nankai University

Mu Guoguang (母國光, 1931–2012) was a Chinese opticist and former president of Nankai University.

== Education ==
He graduated from Department of Physics of Nankai University in 1952, and from then became a faculty member of the same university.

== Career ==
From 1985 to 1995 he served as the president of Nankai University. In 1991 he was elected as a member of Chinese Academy of Sciences. His research focused on white-light optical processing, optical pattern recognition, color film archive storage, false color coding and optical neural networks.
