= Wumart =

Chinese retail company

Wumart Stores, Inc.
- Traditional Chinese: 北京物美商業集團股份有限公司
- Simplified Chinese: 北京物美商业集团股份有限公司
Transcriptions
Standard Mandarin
- Hanyu Pinyin: Běijīng Wù Měi Shāngyè Jítuán Gǔfènyǒuxiàngōngsī

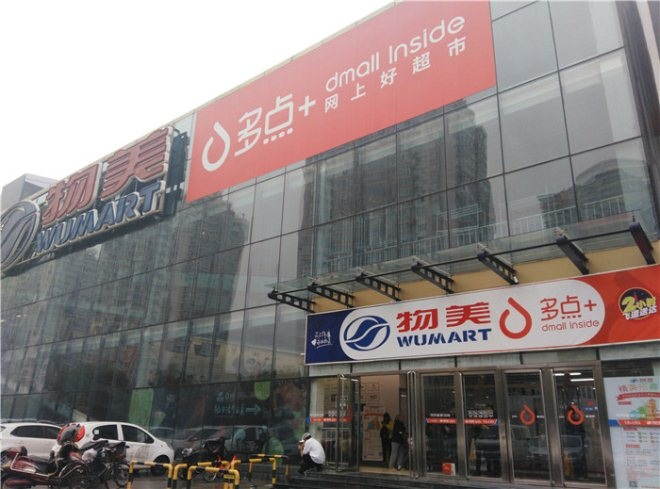
Wumart (Dmall+) Lian Xiang Qiao Store in Beijing

Wumart Stores, Inc. doing business as Wumart, (Chinese: 物美; pinyin: Wùměi; Chinese for "good product") is a Chinese retail company with its headquarters in Haidian District, Beijing.

Wumart was founded in 1994 by Zhang Wenzhong, Wumart Group is one of the earliest and biggest retailers in China and the largest supermarket chain in Beijing-Tianjin-Hebei area. With more than 1,000 Wumart stores in North, East and Northwest China, Wumart has scored revenue of more than 50 billion yuan ($7.8 billion), opened 103 stores in 2017, and continued to march into northeastern and southern regions. Wumart's business formats consist of retail, Internet and IOT technology, logistics and supply chain. The Group has developed location-based ecommerce in Beijing, Hangzhou, Yinchuan, Wuhan and other major cities.

== Corporate affairs ==
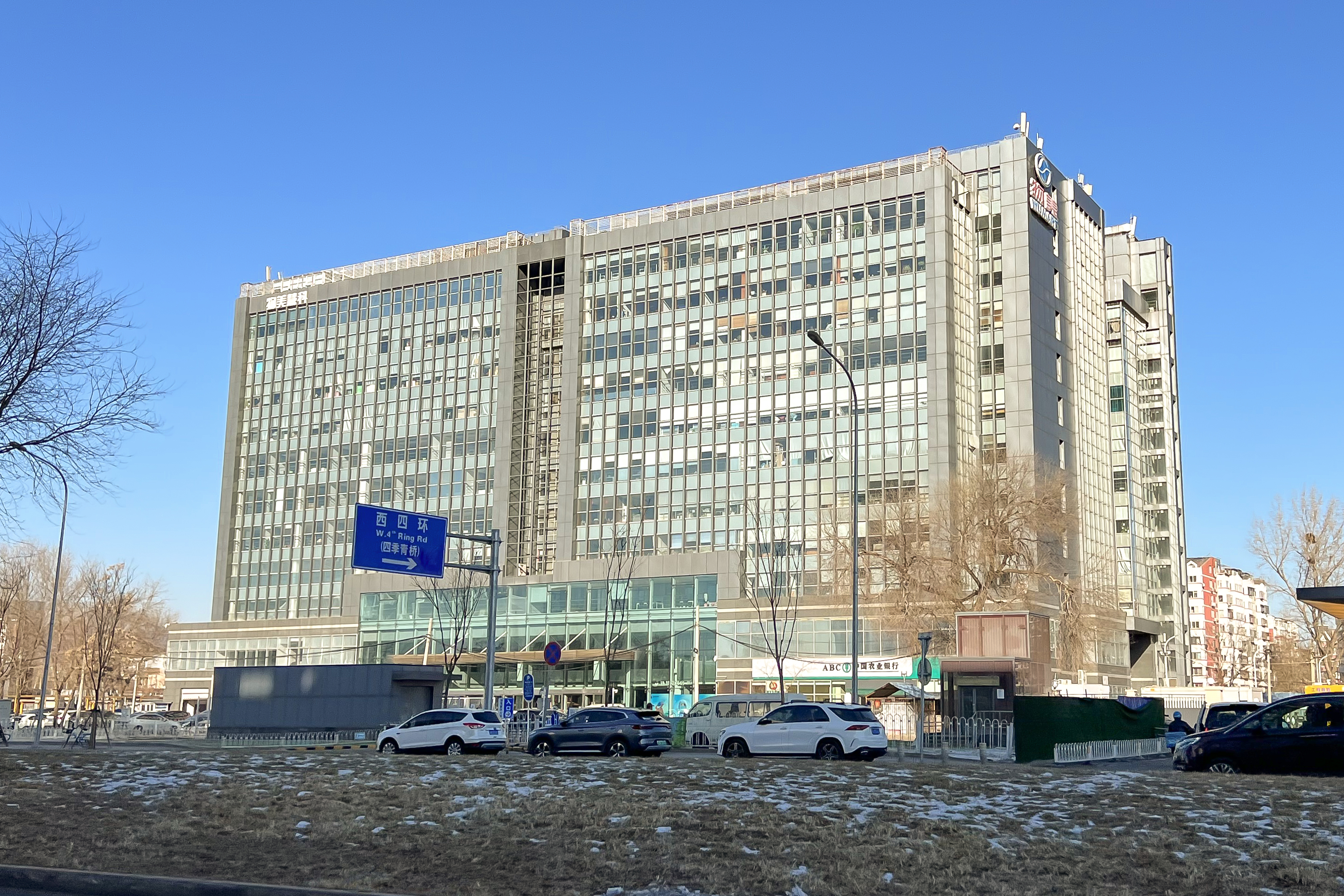
Headquarters of Wumart

The company has its headquarters in the Wumart Commercial Building (S: 物美商业大厦, T: 物美商業大廈, P: Wù Měi Shāngyè Dàshà) in Haidian District, Beijing and its registered office in the Badachu HighTech Park District in Shijingshan District, Beijing. Previously its headquarters were on the 10th floor of the Yuquan Building (S:玉泉大厦, T:玉泉大廈, P: Yùquán Dàshà) in Shijingshan District, Beijing.

Wumart bought 80% stake of Metro China--the subsidiary of Metro AG in China in 2020.

== See also ==
- Metro China
- Jingkelong
- Yonghui Supermarket
- DMALL
