= Xiaowen Zeng =

Chinese-Canadian author

- 曾晓文
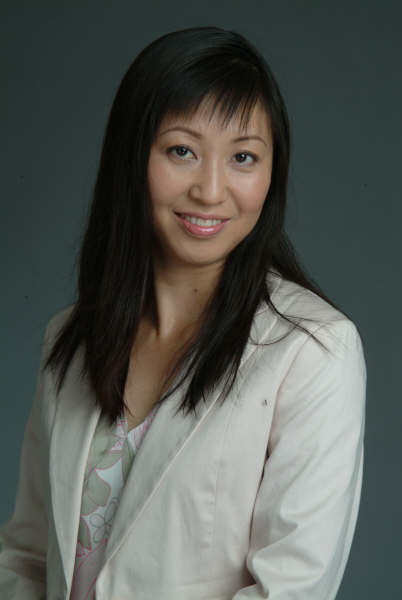
- Xiaowen Zeng.
- Born: Jiamusi, Heilongjiang, China
- Citizenship: Canada
- Education: Nankai University; Syracuse University
- Occupations: Writer screenwriter translator
- Writing career
- Language: Chinese, English
- Period: 1991–present
- Genres: Novel, novella, short story, screenplay, prose
- Notable work: Shattered Dreams in Texas

Chinese name
- Traditional Chinese: 曾曉文
- Simplified Chinese: 曾晓文
Transcriptions
Standard Mandarin
- Hanyu Pinyin: Zēng Xiǎowén

Xiaowen Zeng (Chinese: 曾晓文; pinyin: Zēng Xiǎowén) is a Chinese-Canadian author living in Toronto, Canada.

== Biography ==
Xiaowen Zeng was born in Jiamusi in the Heilongjiang of China. She received a Master of Arts in World Literature from Nankai University. Between 1994 and 2003, she lived in the United States, where she obtained a Master of Science in Telecommunications & Network Management from Syracuse University. In 2003, she immigrated to Canada.

Xiaowen's career in the IT field spanned from 1993 to 2019, during which she held positions such as System Analyst, IT Manager, and Senior Director of IT in Canada, the U.S., and China. In her spare time, she pursued writing, publishing various works of fiction, non-fiction, and screenplays.

Community activities include:

- Vice Chair and Chair of the Chinese Pen Society of Canada from 2004 to 2012
- Co-organized the First Chinese Canadian International Literature Symposium in 2011
- Presented at a number of Oversea Chinese Literature conferences in China
- Interviewed by CCTV (China) in 2006 and 2014; by OMNI Television in 2010, 2014 and 2018; by Fairchild TV in 2009 and 2018; and by a number of TV/radio stations, journals and newspaper in China, Canada and the US
- Presentations of readings and lectures at Toronto Public Library, at schools including Harvard University, the University of Toronto, York University, Western University in Canada, and Jinan University, Zhejiang University, People's University, Nankai University, and Tianjin Normal University in China etc.

== Selected works ==
=== Published works in Chinese ===
==== Novel ====
- The China Chip (《中国芯传奇》) 2019, Co-Author (合著)
- The Immigrant Years (《移民岁月》) 2013
- The Night Is Still Young (《夜还年轻》) 2009
- Shattered Dreams in Texas (also published as The Daytime Floating Journey) (《梦断德克萨斯》或《白日飘行》) 2005

==== Collection of novellas and short stories ====
- The Giant Boy in the Pink Shirt (《穿粉红衬衫的巨人男孩》) 2024
- A Double Petaled Woman (《重瓣女人花》) 2017
- Too Tired to Love (《爱不动了》) 2016
- The Kilt and Clover (《苏格兰短裙和三叶草》) 2012

==== Collection of non-fiction ====
- The Woman Born a Leaf (《属树叶的女子》) 2018
- Carrying the Soul Back Home (《背灵魂回家》) 2017
- Turn Your Back to the Moon (《背对月亮》) 2012

==== TV script ====
- Co-wrote and published a 20-episode TV drama Invented in China (《中国创造》) in 2011. It was made into a 30-episode series re-titled Let Go of Your Hand and aired in 2014 in China. (《错放你的手》)

==== Translation ====
- Anne of Green Gables 2018

==== Movie script ====
- Langqin Island (《浪琴岛》) 2013

=== Published works in English ===
- A translated version of Carrying the Soul Back Home has been published on the Ricepaper.ca website and was included in the Ricepaper 2017 print anthology Currents. It also was long listed for PRISM magazine’s 2015 Creative Non-Fiction Contest.
- First original English short story Return to Gander was published in an anthology of short stories by Chinese authors entitled The Strangers in 2016
- Two short stories, The Kilt and Clover and The Smell, were published in an anthology of translated works by Canadian Chinese Writers entitled Toward the North in 2018

== Selected Awards ==
- CBC Nonfiction Prize longlist for "Wildflower of the Labour Camp" in 2022.
- Overseas Chinese Writing Award for A Double Petaled Woman (《重瓣女人花》in 2019
- The Great Bay Area Cyber Literature Award for The China Chip in 2019
- LinGuo Best Creativity Award for TV script in 2019
- Overseas Chinese Writing Award for The Woman Born a Leaf (《属树叶的女子》in 2018
- Top 10 novellas of 2017 as ranked by the China Fiction Association, for Gold Dust (《金尘》)
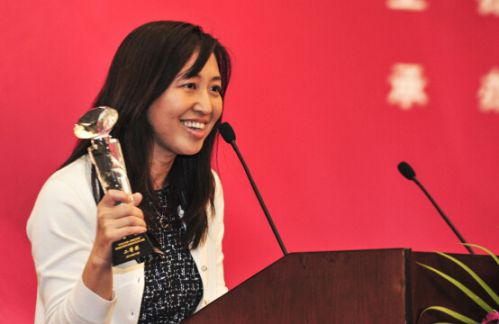
  Xiaowen receiving the top prize in the First Global Chinese Prose Competition, 2014
- Top prize in the First Global Chinese Prose Competition, 2014, for Carrying the Soul Back Home (《背灵魂回家》)
- The Chinese Writers Erdos Literature Award (2011)
- Zhongshan Overseas Literature Award (2011)
- 2011 Best TV Script Award sponsored by the Beijing Municipal Bureau of Radio, Film and television
- Top 10 short stories of 2009 as ranked by the China Fiction Association, for The Kilt and Clover (《苏格兰短裙和三叶草》)
- United Daily News Literature Prize, 2004
- Central Daily News literature Prize, 1996
