= List of members of the Chinese Academy of Engineering =

This is a list of the members (academicians) of the Chinese Academy of Engineering (CAE). CAE academician is the highest academic title officially recognized by the Chinese government in engineering and technological sciences.

As of February 2025, the academy has 1014 living members, divided into nine academic divisions:

- Mechanical and Vehicle Engineering: 135 members
- Information and Electronic Engineering: 148 members
- Chemical, Metallurgical and Materials Engineering: 118 members
- Energy and Mining Engineering: 133 members
- Civil and Hydraulic Engineering and Architecture: 109 members
- Light Industry and Environmental Engineering: 75 members
- Agriculture: 91 members
- Medicine and Health: 134 members
- Engineering Management: 71 members

There are 348 deceased members as of February 2025. Additionally, there are 124 living foreign members and 22 deceased ones.

== Eligibility and election process ==
As of 2019, official rules of the Chinese Academy of Engineering stipulate that elections are held every two years in odd-numbered years. Academicians younger than 80 in the election year have the right to nominate a maximum of three candidates and vote for new academicians. Candidates may be nominated by academicians or academic organizations. Each candidate needs three nominations to qualify, at least two of which must be from academicians in the same division as the candidate. In principle, candidates should be younger than 65, but older candidates may still qualify if they receive six nominations. Government officials holding county-level positions or higher are in principle not eligible. Candidates involved in national defence and security are nominated and elected separately. The number of academicians elected varies each time. In the 2019 election, the quota was set at a maximum of 80.

The Chinese Academy of Engineering began electing foreign members in 1996. The number of foreign members have been kept relatively small, totalling 82 by 2017. As of 2017, 58% of foreign members are American and 33% are of Chinese origin. Well known foreign members include Nobel Prize laureates Barry Marshall and Satoshi Ōmura, Microsoft co-founder Bill Gates, Turing Award winner Raj Reddy, and Pritzker Architecture Prize laureate I. M. Pei.

== Founding members (1994) ==
During preparation for the founding of the Chinese Academy of Engineering, the State Council of China announced the first class of 96 academicians in May 1994:

- Chang Yinfo
- Chen Junliang
- Chen Liwei (1917-2001)
- Ding Dewen
- Ding Henggao
- Duan Zhenji
- Fan Weitang
- Fu Xinian
- Gu Songfen
- Guan De
- Guan Qiao
- Guo Konghui
- He Dequan
- He Jishan
- Hou Xianglin
- Hu Haitao
- Hu Qiheng
- Huang Peiyun
- Huang Xuhua
- Ji Guobiao
- Jiang Xinsong (1931-1997)
- Jin Guofan
- Jin Yilian
- Li Dadong
- Li Deren
- Li Guohao
- Li Hengde
- Li Hongzhi
- Li Tongbao
- Liang Yingchen
- Lin Hua
- Liu Gengling
- Liu Hongliang
- Liu Tianquan
- Liu Xianlin
- Liu Yongtan
- Lu Liangshu
- Lu Yongxiang
- Lu Yuanjiu
- Luo Peilin (1913-2011)
- Ma Fubang
- Min Enze
- Min Guirong
- Ni Guangnan
- Pan Jiazheng
- Peng Shilu
- Qi Yuanjing
- Qian Gaoyun
- Qian Qihu
- Qian Xuesen
- Qian Yi
- Ruan Xueyu
- Shen Zhiyun
- Shi Changxu
- Shi Yuanchun
- Song Jian
- Su Junhong
- Tu Shancheng
- Wang Chengwei
- Wang Daheng
- Wang Demin
- Wang Dianzuo
- Wang Guangyuan
- Wang Mingxiu
- Wang Tao
- Wang Xuan
- Wang Yongzhi
- Wang Yousheng
- Wang Yue
- Wei Yu
- Wen Fubo
- Wu Yousheng
- Wu Zhongwei
- Xie Lili
- Xie Youbai
- Xu Cheng'en
- Xu Gengguang
- Yan Dongsheng
- Yang Qixun
- Yao Fusheng
- Yin Duanyu
- Zhang Guangdou
- Zhang Jijia
- Zhang Jinqiu
- Zhang Wei
- Zhang Zhizhong (1917-2011)
- Zhang Zonghu
- Zhao Renkai
- Zheng Zhemin
- Zhou Ganzhi
- Zhou Jing
- Zhou Lian
- Zhou Zhongyi
- Zhu Gaofeng
- Zhu Guangya
- Zou Jing

== 1995 election ==
216 new members were elected to the Chinese Academy of Engineering in 1995, separated into seven academic divisions:

Mechanical and Vehicle Engineering

- Chen Bingcong
- Chen Xianlin
- Gu Maoxiang
- Guo Chongqing
- He Yousheng
- Huang Wenhu
- Li Ming
- Lin Shangyang
- Lin Zonghu
- Liu Daxiang
- Liu Xingzhou
- Lu Xiaopeng
- Pan Jingfu
- Rao Fangquan
- Sun Jingliang
- Tu Jida
- Tu Mingjing
- Wang Shunting
- Wang Xingzhi
- Xu Binshi
- Yang Shi'e
- Yue Jialing
- Zhang Bingyan
- Zhang Fuze
- Zhang Guitian
- Zhang Litong
- Zhang Qixian
- Zhou Qinzhi
- Zhu Nenghong
- Zhu Yinghao

Information and Electronic Engineering

- Chen Deren
- Chen Jingxiong
- Fan Dianyuan
- Gao Dingsan
- Gong Huixing
- Guo Guirong
- Hou Deyuan
- Huang Shanglian
- Jiang Wenhan
- Li Guojie
- Li Sanli
- Liang Chunguang
- Lin Yongnian
- Lu Jianxun
- Mao Erke
- Shen Changxiang
- Sun Junren
- Sun Youxian
- Sun Yu
- Wang Xiaomo
- Wei Ziqing
- Wu Cheng
- Wu Youshou
- Wu Zukai
- Xu Guozhi
- Xu Juyan
- Xu Yuansen
- Xue Mingqiu
- Ye Minghan
- Ye Shangfu
- Yu Daguang
- Zhang Lüqian
- Zhang Zhonghua
- Zhao Zisen
- Zhou Jiongpan
- Zhuang Songlin

Chemical, Metallurgical and Materials Engineering

- Chen Qingru
- Ding Chuanxian
- Fu Hengzhi
- Gao Congjie
- Guan Xingya
- Hou Fusheng
- Hu Zhuangqi
- Li Dongying
- Li Junxian
- Li Zhengming
- Mao Bingquan
- Qiu Zhuxian
- Shao Xianghua
- Shen Dezhong
- Shi Mingxian
- Tang Mingshu
- Wang Xieqing
- Wang Xuguang
- Wang Zhenxi
- Xu Duanfu
- Xu Kuangdi
- Yin Guomao
- Yu Yongfu
- Yuan Qingtang
- Yuan Weikang
- Zhang Guocheng
- Zhang Shourong
- Zhong Jue
- Zhou Guangyao
- Zhu Yongjun
- Zuo Tieyong

Energy and Mining

- Cen Kefa
- Gu Desheng
- Gu Xinyi
- Han Dexin
- Han Yingduo
- He Duohui
- Hu Side
- Li Qingzhong
- Liang Weiyan
- Liu Guangzhi
- Luo Pingya
- Mao Yongze
- Qi Yingmin
- Qian Minggao
- Qian Shaojun
- Ruan Keqiang
- Tang Dequan
- Tang Zhongli
- Wang Sijing
- Weng Shilie
- Xu Xuchang
- Xue Yusheng
- Yang Yusheng
- Zhai Guangming
- Zheng Jianchao
- Zheng Mianping
- Zhou Bangxin
- Zhou Yongmao
- Zhu Jianshi

Civil and Hydraulic Engineering and Architecture

- Chen Houqun
- Chen Mingzhi
- Chen Xin
- Cui Junzhi
- Feng Shuyu
- Ge Xiurun
- Guan Zhaoye
- Huang Xiling
- Jiang Huancheng
- Jiang Juyuan
- Li Eding
- Li Guibai
- Liu Jianhang
- Liu Jizhou
- Long Yuqiu
- Mo Bozhi
- Ning Jinsheng
- Rong Baisheng
- Sha Qinglin
- Wang Mengshu
- Wu Liangyong
- Xiang Haifan
- Xie Jianheng
- Yan Kai
- Yang Xiumin
- Ye Keming
- Zhou Junliang
- Zhu Bofang

Agriculture, Light Industry and Environmental Engineering

- Fang Zhiyuan
- Fu Tingdong
- Gu Xiasheng
- Guan Huashi
- Guan Junwei
- Huang Yaoxiang
- Li Guangbo
- Li Zechun
- Liu Yun
- Lun Shiyi
- Ma Jianzhang
- Mei Ziqiang
- Ren Jizhou
- Ren Zhenhai
- Shan Lun
- Shen Guofang
- Shen Rongxian
- Shi Yulin
- Bou Shorgan
- Tang Hongxiao
- Tang Xiaoyan
- Wang Maohua
- Xiang Zhonghuai
- Xin Dehui
- Yin Zhen
- Yu Mingfang
- Yuan Longping
- Yuan Yeli
- Zeng Dechao
- Zeng Shimai
- Zhao Fazhen
- Zhou Xiang

Medicine and Health

- Ba Denian
- Cheng Xinnong
- Dong Jianhua
- Gao Shouyi
- Gu Jianren
- Gu Yudong
- He Fengsheng
- Hou Yunde
- Hu Yamei
- Hu Zhibi
- Jiang Shaoji
- Jiang Sichang
- Li Ao
- Li Leishi
- Liu Gengtao
- Liu Yuqing
- Lou Zhicen
- Qin Boyi
- Song Hongzhao
- Tang Zhaoyou
- Wang Zhengguo
- Wang Zhenyi
- Wang Zhongcheng
- Wu Dechang
- Wu Jieping
- Xiao Bilian
- Xiao Peigen
- Xu Wensi
- Zeng Yitao
- Zhou Houyuan

== 1996 election ==
In 1996, 20 new members were elected to the Chinese Academy of Engineering. In addition, seven foreign members were elected for the first time:

Members

- Chen Yazhu
- Cheng Tianmin
- Hong Tao
- Hou Huimin
- Huang Cuifen
- Li Jieshou
- Li Ruilin
- Li Zaiping
- Liu Depei
- Lu Daopei
- Lu Shibi
- Peng Sixun
- Sheng Zhiyong
- Shi Yifan
- Wang Shiwen
- Wu Xianzhong
- Yao Xinsheng
- Zhang Disheng
- Zhong Nanshan
- Zhu Xiaodong

Foreign members

- Norman Borlaug
- Georgiy Byushgens
- Ray Clough
- Tasuku Fuwa
- Michel Halbouty
- Tingye Li
- I. M. Pei

== 1997 election ==
In 1997, 116 new members were elected to the Chinese Academy of Engineering. 5 foreign members were elected the following year.

Mechanical and Vehicle Engineering

- Chen Shilu
- Du Qinghua
- Gao Bolong
- Gu Guobiao
- Guan Jie
- Hu Zhenghuan
- Huang Chongqi
- Li Chunxuan
- Li Helin
- Liang Jincai
- Lin Huabao
- Qian Qingquan
- Shen Wensun
- Wen Junfeng
- Xu Binghan
- Yao Shaofu

Information and Electronic Engineering

- Cai Hegao
- Cai Jiren
- Chen Huowang
- Chen Taiyi
- Gu Guanqun
- Hu Guangzhen
- Li Lemin
- Liang Junwu
- Lin Xiangdi
- Ling Yongshun
- Liu Jie
- Niu Hanben
- Pan Yunhe
- Tong Kai
- Tong Zhipeng
- Wang Renxiang
- Yang Shizhong
- Zhang Guangyi
- Zhao Yijun

Chemical, Metallurgical and Materials Engineering

- Chen Jing
- Cui Kun
- Gu Zhen'an
- Hu Yongkang
- Jin Yong
- Ke Wei
- Lei Tinghan
- Li Longtu
- Liu Boli
- Liu Yexiang
- Lu Zhongwu
- Shen Yinchu
- Wei Kemei
- Xue Qunji
- Yang Qiye

Energy and Mining

- Chen Qingquan
- Chen Yuchuan
- Du Xiangwan
- Hong Boqian
- Hu Jianyi
- Huang Qili
- Jin Qinghuan
- Liu Baochen
- Pan Yuan
- Pan Ziqiang
- Qiao Dengjiang
- Tang Xisheng
- Wang Zhongqi
- Xu Damao
- Zeng Hengyi
- Zhang Yongchuan

Civil and Hydraulic Engineering and Architecture

- Chen Zhaoyuan
- Dong Shilin
- Fang Qinhan
- Liao Zhenpeng
- Lu Yaoru
- Lü Zhitao
- Ma Guoxin
- Qian Zhengying
- She Junnan
- Tan Jingyi
- Wu Zhongru
- Zhang Jie
- Zhang Weizhen
- Zhao Guofan
- Zheng Shouren
- Zhong Xunzheng

Agriculture, Light Industry and Environmental Engineering

- Chen Junyu
- Fan Yunliu
- Huang Zongdao
- Jiang Yiyuan
- Jin Jianming
- Jin Xianglong
- Li Wenhua
- Li Zhenqi
- Lin Haoran
- Sun Jinliang
- Wei Fusheng
- Xu Jianmin
- Yu Songlie
- Zhang Gaoyong
- Zhang Qisheng
- Zhang Ziyi
- Zhu Zunquan

Medicine and Health

- An Jingxian
- Chen Haozhu
- Chi Zhiqiang
- Huang Zhiqiang
- Ruan Changgeng
- Shen Beifen
- Shen Yucun
- Wang Linfang
- Wang Shuhuan
- Wang Yongyan
- Weng Xinzhi
- Yang Shengli
- Yu Weihan
- Zhang Jinzhe
- Zhao Kai
- Zhen Yongsu
- Zhong Shizhen

Foreign members (elected 1998)

- Michael Denis Gale
- V. N. Pochukaev
- Ponisseril Somasundaran
- Simon Sze
- Pierre Tiollais

== 1999 election ==
In 1999, 112 new members were elected to the Chinese Academy of Engineering. 6 foreign members were elected the following year.

Mechanical and Vehicle Engineering

- Ai Xing
- Chen Maozhang
- Chen Yijian
- Cui Guoliang
- Du Shanyi
- Duo Yingxian
- Gao Jinji
- Huang Xianxiang
- Li Zhao
- Liu Baicheng
- Liu Renhuai
- Liu Youmei
- Zeng Guangshang
- Zhong Qunpeng
- Zhou Ji

Information and Electronic Engineering

- Chen Lianghui
- Feng Xisheng
- Gao Jie
- Jiang Jingshan
- Li Deyi
- Li Youping
- Liu Shanghe
- Lu Xicheng
- Pan Junhua
- Sun Jiaguang
- Wei Zhengyao
- Wu Hequan
- Zhang Minggao
- Zhang Xixiang
- Zheng Nanning
- Zhong Shan
- Zhou Liwei

Chemical, Metallurgical and Materials Engineering

- Dai Yongnian
- Cao Xianghong
- Chen Guoliang
- Chen Yunbo
- Huang Boyun
- Li Guanxing
- Li Zhengbang
- Qiu Dingfan
- Shu Xingtian
- Wang Jingkang
- Wang Zeshan
- Wen Lishi
- Wu Sheng
- Wu Weizu
- Zeng Sumin

Energy and Mining

- Fan Mingwu
- Jiang Hongde
- Liu Guangrun
- Ni Weidou
- Pei Rongfu
- Peng Xianjue
- Qiu Aici
- Qiu Zhongjian
- Shen Guorong
- Sun Yufa
- Xian Xuefu
- Xu Shaoxie
- Yu Runcang
- Yu Wenhu
- Zhou Shining

Civil and Hydraulic Engineering and Architecture

- Cao Chusheng (1926-2017)
- Chen Jiyu (1921-2017)
- Dai Fudong
- He Jingtang
- Li Daozeng
- Li Ping
- Liu Jingnan
- Luo Shaoji
- Meng Zhaozhen
- Shen Shizhao
- Shi Zhongheng
- Xie Shileng
- Xu Qianqing (1925-2010)
- Zeng Qingyuan (1925-2016)
- Zheng Jielian
- Zhou Fengjun

Agriculture, Light Industry and Environmental Engineering

- Chen Lianshou
- Dong Yuchen
- Feng Zongwei
- Hou Feng
- Jiang Shicheng
- Liu Dajun
- Liu Shouren
- Song Zhanqian
- Tang Qisheng
- Wang Wenxing
- Wu Mingzhu
- Xiong Yuanzhu
- Xu Xun
- Zhang Fusui
- Zhang Yi
- ~~Zhou Guotai~~
- Zhou Kaida
- Zhu Zhiti

Medicine and Health

- Chen Hongduo
- Chen Jisheng
- Cheng Shujun
- Gao Runlin
- Guo Yinglu
- Ge Baofeng
- Li Shaozhen
- Liu Tonghua
- Sang Guowei
- Shen Jiaxiang
- Shi Xuemin
- Sun Yan
- Wang Weiqi
- Wen Yumei
- Xia Jiahui
- Yu Dequan
- Yu Mengsun

Foreign members (elected 2000)

- Yu-Chi Ho
- Thomas H. Lee
- William Geraint Price
- Bernard Roizman
- Man-Chung Tang
- Chang-Lin Tien

== 2001 election ==
In 2001, 81 new members were elected to the Chinese Academy of Engineering, separated into eight academic divisions (the Division of Engineering Management was added this year). In addition, 7 foreign members were elected.

Mechanical and Vehicle Engineering

- Feng Peide
- Long Lehao
- Ma Weiming
- Pan Jiansheng
- Qi Faren
- Tang Renyuan
- Wang Zherong
- Xu Zhilei
- Yu Benshui
- Zhang Yanzhong
- Zhao Xu

Information and Electronic Engineering

- Ben De
- Chen Zuoning
- Fang Jiaxiong
- Gong Xianyi
- Li Bohu
- He Xingui
- Sun Zhongliang
- Wang Zicai
- Xu Zuyan
- Yao Jun'en
- Zhang Naitong

Chemical, Metallurgical and Materials Engineering

- Cai Hongnian
- Chen Liquan
- Gan Yong
- Jiang Dongliang
- He Jilin
- Ouyang Pingkai
- Yang Jinzong
- Zhang Yaoming

Energy and Mining

- Chen Senyu
- Dorji
- Fan Weicheng
- Fu Yibei
- Gu Jincai
- Han Dakuang
- Qin Yukun
- Shen Zhonghou
- Wang Jun
- Xie Heping
- Zhao Wenjin

Civil and Hydraulic Engineering and Architecture

- Chen Zhikai
- Fan Lichu
- Han Qiwei
- Jiang Yi
- Li Youjia
- Lin Junde
- Ma Hongqi
- Wang Jiayao
- Wang Sanyi
- Wei Dunshan
- Zheng Yingren

Agriculture, Light Industry and Environmental Engineering

- Cai Daoji
- Dai Jingrui
- Gai Junyi
- Guan Chunyun
- Guo Yuyuan
- Lin Peng
- Pan Delu
- Shu Huairui
- Sun Jiulin
- Sun Tieheng
- Xia Dequan
- Yao Mu

Medicine and Health

- Fan Daiming
- Li Chunyan
- Liu Yao
- Qiu Weiliu
- Tang Xican
- Wu Tianyi
- Xie Lixin
- Yu Yongxin
- Zhang Xinshi
- Zhang Yun
- Zheng Shusen
- Zhuang Hui

Engineering Management

- Fu Zhihuan
- Li Jingwen
- Liu Yuanzhang
- Wang Zhongtuo
- Xu Shoubo

Foreign members

- Thomas Bell
- Jacques Caen
- K. S. E. Forsberg
- Thomas Huang
- Adolf W. Lohmann
- Günter Spur
- Ray Wu

== 2003 election ==
In 2003, 58 new members were elected to the Chinese Academy of Engineering, as well as 4 foreign members.

Mechanical and Vehicle Engineering

- Huang Ruisong
- Li Peigen
- Liu Yixin
- Meng Zhizhong
- Qu Liangsheng
- Shi Ping
- Song Wencong
- Wang Yuming
- Xu Yuru

Information and Electronic Engineering

- Chai Tianyou
- Gong Zhiben
- Ma Yuanliang
- Wang Tianran
- Wu Jiangxing
- Ye Shenghua
- Zhou Shouheng

Chemical, Metallurgical and Materials Engineering

- Dong Haishan
- Sang Fengting
- Sun Chuanyao
- Xie Kechang
- Xu Delong
- Zhang Wenhai
- Zhao Liancheng

Energy and Mining

- Lee Chack-fan
- Lei Qingquan
- Sun Caixin
- Sun Chengwei
- Su Yinao
- Ye Qizhen
- Yi Baolian
- Zhang Tiegang

Civil and Hydraulic Engineering and Architecture

- Mao Zhi
- Ou Jinping
- Wang Jingquan
- Wang Ruizhu
- Zhang Chaoran
- Zhang Zaiming
- Zhang Zuxun
- Zhou Fulin
- Zou Deci

Agriculture, Light Industry and Environmental Engineering

- Chen Kefu
- Chen Huanchun
- Chen Zongmao
- Hou Baorong
- Li Peicheng
- Rong Tingzhao
- Samuel Sun
- Xia Xianzhu

Medicine and Health

- Chen Saijuan
- Dai Kerong
- Hao Xishan
- Li Lianda
- Liu Changxiao
- Liu Zhihong
- Xiang Kunsan

Engineering Management

- Lu Youmei
- Wang Liheng
- Wang Yingluo

Foreign members

- Akira Fujishima
- David Ho
- N. P. Lyakishev
- Miomir Vukobratović

== 2005 election ==
In 2005, 50 new members were elected to the Chinese Academy of Engineering, as well as 6 foreign members.

Mechanical and Vehicle Engineering

- Chen Yushu
- Fan Benyao
- Lu Bingheng
- Su Zhezi
- Xu Demin
- Yin Zeyong
- Zhong Zhihua

Information and Electronic Engineering

- Chen Jing
- Dai Hao
- Fang Binxing
- Huang Peikang
- Liu Yunjie

Chemical, Metallurgical and Materials Engineering

- Chen Bingzhen
- Wang Guodong
- Wang Yide
- Wu Yicheng
- Xu Nanping
- Zhao Zhenye

Energy and Mining

- An Jigang
- Chen Niannian
- Kang Yuzhu
- Tong Xiaoguang
- Wen Xueyou
- Yu Yixin
- Yuan Zhiyi
- Zhang Xinwei

Civil and Hydraulic Engineering and Architecture

- Cheng Taining
- Liang Wenhao
- Lin Yuanpei
- Shen Zuyan
- Sun Wei
- Wang Hao
- Xu Qifeng

Agriculture, Light Industry and Environmental Engineering

- Cheng Shunhe
- Ding Yihui
- Hao Jiming
- Lei Jilin
- Liu Xiufan
- Yin Weilun
- Zhu Yingguo

Medicine and Health

- Cao Xuetao
- Chen Junshi
- Fan Shangda
- Li Lanjuan
- Wang Hongyang
- Zhang Boli
- Zhou Honghao

Engineering Management

- Shen Rongjun
- Sun Yongfu
- Wang Jiming

Foreign members

- Alec Broers
- Yuri Gulyayev
- Chain-Tsuan Liu
- Satoshi Ōmura
- Władysław Wlosinski
- William Wulf

== 2007 election ==
In 2007, 32 new members were elected to the Chinese Academy of Engineering, divided into 9 academic divisions (Agriculture was separated from Light Industry and Environmental Engineering). In addition, 3 foreign members were elected.

Mechanical and Vehicle Engineering

- Chen Futian
- Tan Jianrong
- Yang Fengtian
- Zang Kemao
- Zhang Jinlin

Information and Electronic Engineering

- Xu Yangsheng
- Zhang Yaoxue

Chemical, Metallurgical and Materials Engineering

- Jiang Desheng
- Tu Hailing
- Zhang Xingdong

Energy and Mining

- Ding Bonan
- Li Licheng
- Peng Suping

Civil and Hydraulic Engineering and Architecture

- Huang Wei
- Lei Zhidong
- Ma Kejian
- Wang Xiaodong

Light Industry and Environmental Engineering

- Fang Guohong
- Pang Guofang
- Zhang Quanxing

Agriculture

- Deng Xiuxin
- ~~Li Ning~~
- Liu Xingtu
- Yan Long'an
- Yu Zhenwen

Medicine and Health

- Chen Chao-long
- Chen Xiangmei
- Chen Zhinan
- Li Dapeng
- Qiu Guixing
- Yuan Guonan

Engineering Management

- Wang Yupu
- Xu Qingrui

Foreign members

- Odd Magnus Faltinsen
- Norden E. Huang
- Way Kuo

== 2009 election ==
In 2009, 47 new members were elected to the Chinese Academy of Engineering, as well as 6 foreign members.

Mechanical and Vehicle Engineering

- Dong Chunpeng
- Duan Zhengcheng
- Jin Donghan
- Liu Yongcai

Information and Electronic Engineering

- Deng Zhonghan
- Wu Manqing
- Yu Quan

Chemical, Metallurgical and Materials Engineering

- Fu Xianzhi
- Liu Jiongtian
- Weng Yuqing
- Zhang Shengyong
- Zhou Yu
- Zhou Kesong

Energy and Mining

- Ma Yongsheng
- Wan Yuanxi
- Yu Junchong
- Yuan Liang
- Yue Guangxi
- Zhou Shouwei

Civil and Hydraulic Engineering and Architecture

- He Huawu
- Qin Shunquan
- Ren Nanqi
- Yang Yongbin
- Zhang Jianyun
- Zhong Denghua

Light Industry and Environmental Engineering

- Hou Li'an
- ~~Meng Wei~~
- Qu Jiuhui
- Shi Bi
- Sun Baoguo
- Xu Xiangde

Agriculture

- Chen Wenfu
- Li Yu
- Liu Xu
- Luo Xiwen
- Mai Kangsen
- Nan Zhibiao
- Zhang Gaiping

Medicine and Health

- Cheng Jing
- Ding Jian
- Fu Xiaobing
- Liao Wanqing
- Wu Yiling
- Yang Baofeng
- Zhou Liangfu

Engineering Management

- Luan Enjie
- Wang An
- Wang Longde

Foreign members

- Colin Blakemore
- Liang-Shih Fan
- Raj Reddy
- Surendra P. Shah
- Charles M. Vest
- Henry T. Yang

== 2011 election ==
In 2011, 54 new members were elected to the Chinese Academy of Engineering, as well as 6 foreign members.

Mechanical and Vehicle Engineering

- Ding Rongjun
- Gan Xiaohua
- Guo Dongming
- Lin Zhongqin
- Liu Lianyuan
- Tang Changhong
- Yang Shaoqing
- Zhu Yingfu

Information and Electronic Engineering

- Chen Zhijie
- Duan Baoyan
- Gao Wen
- Li Tianchu
- Lü Yueguang
- Wushour Silamu

Chemical, Metallurgical and Materials Engineering

- Chen Xiangbao
- Li Yanrong
- Qian Xuhong
- Qiu Guanzhou
- Tan Tianwei
- Wang Haizhou
- Xu Huibin

Energy and Mining

- Li Xiaohong
- Su Wanhua
- Sun Longde
- Xu Mi
- Zhang Yuzhuo
- Zhao Xiangeng

Civil and Hydraulic Engineering and Architecture

- Cui Kai
- Gong Xiaonan
- Li Jiancheng
- Liu Jiaping
- Miao Changwen
- Wang Chao
- Zhou Xuhong

Light Industry and Environmental Engineering

- Duan Ning
- Qu Jinping
- Wang Rusong
- Xie Jianping

Agriculture

- Chen Jianping
- Kang Shaozhong
- Li Jian
- Wu Kongming
- Yu Shuxun
- Zhu Youyong

Medicine and Health

- Cong Bin
- Lang Jinghe
- Joseph Sung
- Wang Xuehao
- Xu Jianguo
- Yu Jinming
- Zhan Qimin

Engineering Management

- Hu Wenrui
- Zhao Xiaozhe
- Zheng Jingchen

Foreign members

- Edward F. Crawley
- Harvey V. Fineberg
- Hideaki Koizumi
- Barry Marshall
- Frieder Seible
- Jeffrey Wadsworth

== 2013 election ==
In 2013, 51 new members were elected to the Chinese Academy of Engineering, as well as 6 foreign members.

Mechanical and Vehicle Engineering

- Fan Huitao
- Jiang Zhuangde
- Li Jun
- Xu Qinan
- Yang Huayong
- You Zheng
- Zhang Jun

Information and Electronic Engineering

- Ding Wenhua
- Fei Aiguo
- Gui Weihua
- He You
- Yang Xiaoniu
- Zhang Guangjun
- Zhao Qinping

Chemical, Metallurgical and Materials Engineering

- Ding Wenjiang
- Jian Xigao
- Li Yuanyuan
- Li Zhongping

Energy and Mining

- Cai Meifeng
- Chen Yong
- Guo Jianbo
- Li Yang
- Ouyang Xiaoping
- Xia Jiawen
- Zhao Wenzhi

Civil and Hydraulic Engineering and Architecture

- Du Yanliang
- Guo Renzhong
- Hu Chunhong
- Nie Jianguo
- Niu Xinqiang
- Xiao Xuwen

Light Industry and Environmental Engineering

- Liu Wenqing
- Song Junqiang
- Yu Jianyong
- Zhang Si
- Zhu Beiwei

Agriculture

- Chen Xuegeng
- Li Defa
- Yin Yulong
- Zhao Zhendong

Medicine and Health

- Han Demin
- Han Yaling
- Hu Shengshou
- Lin Dongxin
- Wang Chen
- Wang Guangji
- Xia Zhaofan

Engineering Management

- Cao Yaofeng
- Huang Weihe
- Yang Shanlin
- Zhou Jianping

Foreign members

- Robin Batterham
- John C. Crittenden
- Fred C. Lee
- Preben T. Pedersen
- Cun-Yu Wang
- Ching-Ping Wong

== 2015 election ==
In 2015, 70 new members were elected to the Chinese Academy of Engineering, as well as 8 foreign members.

Mechanical and Vehicle Engineering

- Chen Xuedong
- Hou Xiao
- Li Dequn
- Li Kuiwu
- Qiu Zhiming
- Sun Cong
- Tian Hongqi
- Wang Huaming
- Yang Desen

Information and Electronic Engineering

- Chen Chun
- Fan Bangkui
- Jiang Huilin
- Liao Xiangke
- Wang Endong
- Wu Jianping
- Wu Weiren
- Yu Shaohua

Chemical, Metallurgical and Materials Engineering

- Chen Fen'er
- Chen Jianfeng
- Li Wei
- Liu Zhongmin
- Mao Xinping
- Qian Feng
- Wang Yingjun
- Wang Yuzhong
- Xie Jianxin

Energy and Mining

- Deng Yunhua
- Gu Dazhao
- Kang Hongpu
- Li Gensheng
- Li Jiangang
- Liu Jizhen
- Luo An
- Wu Qiang

Civil and Hydraulic Engineering and Architecture

- Chen Zhengqing
- Meng Jianmin
- Peng Yongzhen
- Ren Huiqi
- Tan Shusen
- Wang Fuming
- Wang Jianguo
- Zheng Jianlong

Light Industry and Environmental Engineering

- He Kebin
- Li Jiabiao
- Wu Qingping
- Yang Zhifeng
- Yue Guojun
- Zhang Yuanhang

Agriculture

- Cao Fuliang
- Jin Ningyi
- Li Tianlai
- Shen Jianzhong
- Song Bao'an
- Tang Huajun
- Wan Jianmin
- Zhang Hongcheng
- Zhang Xinyou

Medicine and Health

- Gao Changqing
- Gu Xiaosong
- Huang Luqi
- Li Song
- Ning Guang
- Sun Yinghao
- Zhang Zhiyuan

Engineering Management

- Chai Hongfeng
- Ding Lieyun
- Jin Zhixin
- Ling Wen
- Shao Anlin
- Xiang Qiao

Foreign members

- Ian David Cluckie
- Cato T. Laurencin
- Wenyuan Li
- Herbert A. Mang
- C. Daniel Mote Jr.
- Arogyaswami Paulraj
- Ching-Hon Pui
- Ralph T. Yang

== 2017 election ==
In 2017, 67 new members were elected to the Chinese Academy of Engineering, as well as 18 foreign members.

Mechanical and Vehicle Engineering

- Deng Zongquan
- Feng Yufang
- He Lin
- Huang Qingxue
- Sun Fengchun
- Wang Zhenguo
- Wu Guanghui
- Xia Changliang
- Zhou Zhicheng

Information and Electronic Engineering

- Chen Jie
- Dai Qionghai
- Liu Yongjian
- Liu Zejin
- Lu Jun
- Ning Bin
- Tan Jiubin
- Wang Shafei

Chemical, Metallurgical and Materials Engineering

- Dai Houliang
- Huang Xiaowei
- Nie Zuoren
- Pan Fusheng
- Peng Jinhui
- Wu Feng
- Zhang Lianmeng
- Zheng Yuguo
- Zhou Ji

Energy and Mining

- Deng Jianjun
- Mao Jingwen
- Sun Jinsheng
- Tang Guangfu
- Tang Li
- Wang Guofa
- Wang Shuangming

Civil and Hydraulic Engineering and Architecture

- Chen Xiangsheng
- Deng Mingjiang
- Kong Xianjing
- Li Huajun
- Wu Zhiqiang
- Xie Xianqi
- Yue Qingrui
- Zhang Jianmin

Light Industry and Environmental Engineering

- Chen Jian
- He Hong
- Jiang Xingwei
- Wang Qi
- Wu Fengchang
- Zhu Lizhong

Agriculture

- Bao Zhenmin
- Jiang Jianchun
- Kang Zhensheng
- Wang Hanzhong
- Zhang Fusuo
- Zhang Shougong
- Zhao Chunjiang
- Zou Xuexiao

Medicine and Health

- Dong Jiahong
- Li Zhaoshen
- Ma Ding
- Qiao Jie
- Tian Zhigang
- Wang Rui
- Zhang Yingze

Engineering Management

- Chen Xiaohong
- Fan Guobin
- Liu He
- Lu Chunfang
- Wang Jinnan

Foreign members

- Stephen P. Boyd
- Webster Cavenee
- Ann Dowling
- Menachem Elimelech
- Bill Gates
- Donald Grierson
- Min Gu
- Michael R. Hoffmann
- S. Jack Hu
- Ahsan Kareem
- Nick Lemoine
- Kai Li
- Yiu-Wing Mai
- Nicholas Peppas
- L. Rafael Reif
- Konstantin Solntsev
- Yukio Tamura
- Aibing Yu

== 2019 election ==
In 2019, 75 new members were elected to the Chinese Academy of Engineering, as well as 29 foreign members.

Mechanical and Vehicle Engineering

- Cao Xibin
- Shan Zhongde
- Shao Xinyu
- Xiang Changle
- Xiang Jinwu
- Xiao Longxu
- Xu Qing
- Yan Xinping
- Yang Shuxing
- Zhu Guangsheng

Information and Electronic Engineering

- Luo Xiangang
- Su Donglin
- Sun Ninghui
- Wang Yaonan
- Wei Yiyin
- Wu Hanming
- Yao Fuqiang
- Zhang Ping
- Zheng Weimin

Chemical, Metallurgical and Materials Engineering

- Chai Liyuan
- Dong Shaoming
- Gong Shengkai
- Li Hejun
- Liu Zhengdong
- Peng Shou
- Ren Qilong
- Tu Shandong
- Zhang Pingxiang

Energy and Mining

- Guo Xusheng
- Huang Zhen
- Li Ning
- Lin Jun
- Luo Qi
- Shu Yinbiao
- Wang Yunmin
- Yang Chunhe
- Zhao Zhentang

Civil and Hydraulic Engineering and Architecture

- Chen Jun
- Feng Xiating
- Li Shucai
- Lü Xilin
- Ma Jun
- Xu Jian
- Zhang Xigang
- Zhuang Weimin

Light Industry and Environmental Engineering

- Chen Wei (陈卫)
- Chen Wenxing
- Ren Fazheng
- Ren Hongqiang
- Wang Qiao
- Xu Zuxin
- Zhang Xiaoye

Agriculture

- Hu Peisong
- Li Peiwu
- Liu Shaojun
- Liu Zhonghua
- Yao Bin
- Zhang Jiabao
- Zhang Yong

Medicine and Health

- Chen Wei (陈薇)
- Li Xiaokun
- Liu Liang
- Shang Hong
- Shen Hongbing
- Tian Wei
- Wang Jun
- Wang Junzhi
- Wang Qi
- Zhang Xue

Engineering Management

- Cao Jianguo
- Dong Erdan
- Li Xianyu
- Sun Lili
- Tang Lixin
- Wang Jian

Foreign members

- Hiroshi Amano
- Leif Andersson
- Anjan Bose
- Sébastien Candel
- Yihai Cao
- Brent Euan Clothier
- Jason Cong
- Daniel Couturier
- Glen Daigger
- Felix Dapare Dakora
- Victor Dzau
- Roger Falconer
- James Giovannoni
- Petr Glybochko
- Michael Hood
- Henning Kagermann
- Enrique Lavernia
- Bruce E. Logan
- Mark van Loosdrecht
- John Loughhead
- Torgeir Moan
- Jens Nielsen
- Vladimir Pismenyi
- Yahya Rahmat-Samii
- J. N. Reddy
- Xuemin Shen
- David Weitz
- Philip Withers
- Vigor Yang
