= Qilong =

Qilong may refer to:

== Places in China ==
- Qilong Township, an exclave of Jiangsu province on Shanghai's Chongming Island
- Qilong station (Chongqing Rail Transit), a station on Line 3 of the Chongqing Metro, China
- Qilong station (Chengdu Metro), a station on Line 5 of the Chengdu Metro, China

== People ==
- Ren Qilong (born 1959), Chinese engineer
- Tan Qilong (1913–2003), Chinese politician
- Zhang Qilong (1900–1987), Chinese politician
