= Xu Qing (disambiguation) =

Xu Qing (born 1969) is a Chinese actress.

Xu Qing may also refer to:

- Xu Qing (engineer) (born 1960), Chinese ship designer
- Xu Qing (swimmer) (born 1992), Chinese Paralympic swimmer
- Xu Qing (character), fictional Song dynasty knight-errant

== See also ==
- Xu Qin, Chinese politician
