= Gu Jianren =

Chinese scientist (1932–2022)

- 顾健人
- Born: 13 January 1932; Suzhou, Jiangsu, China
- Died: 27 September 2022 (aged 90); Shanghai, China
- Education: Shanghai Medical College
- Spouse: Fang Lijun
- Scientific career
- Fields: Tumor molecular biology
- Workplaces: Shanghai Cancer Institute, Shanghai Jiao Tong University

Chinese name
- Simplified Chinese: 顾健人
- Traditional Chinese: 顧健人
Transcriptions
Standard Mandarin
- Hanyu Pinyin: Gù Jiànrén

Gu Jianren (Chinese: 顾健人; 13 January 1932 – 27 September 2022) was a Chinese oncologist who was a professor at Shanghai Medical College, and an academician of the Chinese Academy of Engineering.

== Biography ==
Gu was born in Suzhou, Jiangsu, on 13 January 1932, to Gu Weicheng (顾唯诚), a doctor and founder of Suzhou No. 2 People's Hospital. Gu attended Caoqiao Primary School (草桥小学), Jingfan Middle School (景范初级中学), and Suzhou Youyuan High School affiliated with Fudan University (复旦大学附属苏州有原高级中学). In 1948, he was accepted to Shanghai Medical College and worked at Shanghai Cancer Institute after graduation. He was a visiting scholar at Beatson Cancer Institute between 1979 and 1981. In 1985, he founded the National Key Laboratory of Oncogenes and Related Genes and served as director from 1985 to 2002. In 2014, he became honorary director of both Renji Hospital affiliated with the Medical College of Shanghai Jiaotong University and the Shanghai Cancer Research Institute.

On 27 September 2022, he died of an illness in Shanghai, at the age of 90.

== Personal life ==
Gu married Fang Lijun (方利君), who was a classmate at university.

== Publication ==
- 原发性肝癌:挑战与展望 [Primary Liver Cancer: Challenges and Perspectives] (in Chinese). Hangzhou, Zhejiang: Zhejiang University Press. 2012. ISBN 9787308095556.

== Honours and awards ==
- 1995 Member of the Chinese Academy of Engineering (CAE)
- 1997 Science and Technology Progress Award of the Ho Leung Ho Lee Foundation
