= Su Donglin =

Chinese engineer

- Born: March 1960 (age 66); Laiwu District, Jinan, Shandong, China
- Education: Beihang University
- Scientific career
- Fields: Electromagnetic compatibility
- Workplaces: Beihang University

Chinese name
- Traditional Chinese: 蘇東林
- Simplified Chinese: 苏东林
Transcriptions
Standard Mandarin
- Hanyu Pinyin: Sū Dōnglín

Su Donglin (Chinese: 苏东林; born March 1960) is a Chinese engineer specializing in electromagnetic compatibility. She is an academician of the Chinese Academy of Engineering and a professor at Beihang University. She has been hailed as "female electromagnetic detective".

== Biography ==
Su was born in Laiwu District of Jinan, Shandong, in March 1960. She studied and then taught at Beihang University. She was a visiting scholar at the University of California, Los Angeles.

== Honours and awards ==
- 2018 State Technological Invention Award (First Class)
- May 7, 2019 National Labor Medal
- November 22, 2019 Member of the Chinese Academy of Engineering (CAE)
