= Dai Yongnian =

Chinese engineer (1929–2022)

- 戴永年
- Born: 9 February 1929; Kunming, Yunnan, China
- Died: 27 January 2022 (aged 92); Kunming, Yunnan, China
- Education: Yunnan University; Central South University
- Scientific career
- Fields: Metallurgy
- Workplaces: Kunming University of Science and Technology

Dai Yongnian (Chinese: 戴永年; pinyin: Dài Yǒngnián; 9 February 1929 – 27 January 2022) was a Chinese engineer who was a professor at Kunming University of Science and Technology, and an academician of the Chinese Academy of Engineering.

== Biography ==
Dai was born in Kunming, Yunnan, on 9 February 1929, while his ancestral home was in Tonghai County. In 1947, he was admitted to the Department of Mining and Metallurgy, Yunnan University. He joined the Yunnan Democratic Youth League in December 1948, and joined the Chinese Communist Party in August 1949. He had served in the People's Liberation Army since 1949, during the Chinese Civil War. He returned to Yunnan University in 1950 and taught there after graduation. In 1954, he was accepted by Central-South Institute of Mining and Metallurgy (now Central South University), graduating in 1956 with a master's degree in metallurgy. In July 1956, he joined the faculty of Kunming University of Science and Technology, where he was promoted to full professor in February 1986. He died in Kunming on 27 January 2022, at the age of 92.

== Honours and awards ==
- 1999 Member of the Chinese Academy of Engineering (CAE)
