= Zhang Jiabao =

Chinese soil scientist

- Born: September 1957 (age 68–69); Gaoyou, Jiangsu, China
- Education: Nanjing Agricultural University; University of the Philippines
- Scientific career
- Fields: Pedology
- Workplaces: Institute of Soil Science, Chinese Academy of Sciences

Chinese name
- Traditional Chinese: 張佳寶
- Simplified Chinese: 张佳宝
Transcriptions
Standard Mandarin
- Hanyu Pinyin: Zhāng Jiābǎo

Zhang Jiabao (Chinese: 张佳宝; born September 1957) is a Chinese soil scientist who is a researcher at the Institute of Soil Science, Chinese Academy of Sciences. He is also a professor and doctoral supervisor at the University of Chinese Academy of Sciences.

== Biography ==
Zhang was born in Gaoyou, Jiangsu, in September 1957. He attended Nanjing Agricultural University where he received his bachelor's degree in 1982. After completing his master's degree at the Institute of Soil Science, Chinese Academy of Sciences, he attended the University of the Philippines where he obtained his doctor's degree in soil physics in 1990.

== Honours and awards ==
- November 22, 2019 Member of the Chinese Academy of Engineering (CAE)
