= Wang Zhenguo =

Chinese engineer

- 王振国
- Born: 15 June 1960 (age 66); Changde, Hunan, China
- Education: National University of Defense Technology
- Scientific career
- Fields: Aerospace propulsion technology
- Workplaces: National University of Defense Technology

Chinese name
- Simplified Chinese: 王振国
- Traditional Chinese: 王振國
Transcriptions
Standard Mandarin
- Hanyu Pinyin: Wáng Zhènguó

Wang Zhenguo (born 15 June 1960) is a Chinese engineer in the fields of aerospace propulsion technology. He is an academician of the Chinese Academy of Engineering (CAE).

== Biography ==
Wang was born in Changde, Hunan, on 15 June 1960. He attended National University of Defense Technology, graduating in 1993 with a doctor's degree in space technology. On 24 February 2018, he was elected a delegate to the 13th National People's Congress.

On 10 August 2019, he was recruited by Tianjin Polytechnic University, becoming its first dean of Artificial Intelligence College.

== Honours and awards ==
- November 27, 2017 Member of the Chinese Academy of Engineering (CAE)
