= Yu Benshui =

- 于本水
- Born: 1 May 1934; Jiutai County, Jilin, Manchukuo
- Died: 27 August 2025 (aged 91); Beijing, China
- Education: Beijing Foreign Studies University; Moscow Aviation Institute
- Scientific career
- Fields: Aircraft design
- Workplaces: 2nd Department Group of the 2nd Academy of China Aerospace Science and Technology Corporation

Yu Benshui (Chinese: 于本水; pinyin: Yú Běnshuǐ; 1 May 1934 – 27 August 2025) was a Chinese aircraft designer, and an academician of the Chinese Academy of Engineering.

== Biography ==
Yu was born in Jiutai County, Jilin, Manchukuo (now Jiutai District of Changchun, China) on 1 May 1934. He joined the Chinese Communist Party (CCP) in July 1953. After studying Russian at the Beijing Russian Language Institute (now Beijing Foreign Studies University) for one year, he was sent to study at Moscow Aviation Institute on government scholarships.

Yu returned to China in September 1960 and became deputy project leader of the 2nd Department of the 1st Branch of the 5th Academy of the Ministry of National Defense, and in May 1962, he was promoted to project leader of the 2nd Department of the 2nd Branch of the 5th Academy of the Ministry of National Defense. He was deputy director of the 2nd Department of the 2nd Institute of the 7th Ministry of Machinery Industry in May 1965 and subsequently director of the Research Laboratory of the 26th Institute of the 2nd Academy of the 7th Ministry of Machinery Industry in January 1970. In January 1980, he became director of the 2nd Department Group of the 2nd Academy of China Aerospace Science and Technology Corporation, and held that office until January 1980.

On 27 August 2025, Yu died in Beijing, at the age of 91.

== Honours and awards ==
- 1992 State Science and Technology Progress Award (Grand Prize) for xx missile weapon system
- 2001 Member of the Chinese Academy of Engineering (CAE)
- 2003 State Science and Technology Progress Award (Second Class) for xx ship-to-air missile weapon system
