= Sun Fengchun =

Chinese engineer

- 孙逢春
- Born: 6 June 1958 (age 68); Linli County, Hunan, China
- Education: Hunan University; Beijing Institute of Technology
- Scientific career
- Fields: New energy vehicles
- Workplaces: Beijing Institute of Technology; National Engineering Laboratory for Electric Vehicles

Chinese name
- Simplified Chinese: 孙逢春
- Traditional Chinese: 孫逢春
Transcriptions
Standard Mandarin
- Hanyu Pinyin: Sūn Féngchūn

Sun Fengchun (born 6 June 1958) is a Chinese engineer specializing in new energy vehicles, currently serving as a professor at Beijing Institute of Technology and director of National Engineering Laboratory for Electric Vehicles. He is an academician of the Chinese Academy of Engineering (CAE).

== Biography ==
Sun was born in Linli County, Hunan, on 6 June 1958. In 1978, he attended Hunan University, graduating with a bachelor's degree in engineering mechanics. He went on to receive his master's degree and doctor's degree in vehicle engineering from Beijing Institute of Technology in 1984 and 1989, respectively. In August 1987, he pursued advanced studies at Technische Universität Berlin, and returned to China in May 1989. After graduating, he stayed at the university and worked successively as a lecturer (1989–1990), associate professor (1990–1994), professor (1994–present), and vice president (2002–2016).

== Honours and awards ==
- 2004 State Technological Invention Award (Second Class)
- 2008 State Science and Technology Progress Award (Second Class)
- 2009 State Technological Invention Award (Second Class)
- November 27, 2017 2017 Member of the Chinese Academy of Engineering (CAE)
