= Xiang Changle =

Chinese engineer

- 项昌乐

Communist Party Secretary of Dalian University of Technology
- Incumbent
- Assumed office 21 October 2021
- Preceded by: Wang Hansong

Personal details
- Born: April 1963 (age 63) Lu'an, Anhui, China
- Party: Chinese Communist Party
- Education: Beijing Institute of Technology
- Scientific career
- Fields: Vehicle transmission
- Institutions: Beijing Institute of Technology

Chinese name
- Traditional Chinese: 項昌樂
- Simplified Chinese: 项昌乐
Transcriptions
Standard Mandarin
- Hanyu Pinyin: Xiàng Chānglè

Xiang Changle (born April 1963) is a Chinese engineer currently serving as Chinese Communist Party Committee Secretary of Dalian University of Technology, Previously he served as vice-president and executive deputy secretary of Beijing Institute of Technology.

== Biography ==
Xiang was born in Lu'an, Anhui, in April 1963. He earned his bachelor's degree in 1984, a master's degree in 1987, and a doctor's degree in 2001, all from Beijing Institute of Technology. He was a visiting scholar in the United States between 1999 and 2000.

In November 2014 he was promoted to vice-president of Beijing Institute of Technology. In June 2016, he became secretary of China Association for Science and Technology. On November 8, 2019, he was appointed executive deputy secretary of the university. On 21 October 2021, he was appointed Chinese Communist Party Committee Secretary of Dalian University of Technology, taking over from Wang Hansong.

== Honors and awards ==
- November 22, 2019 Member of the Chinese Academy of Engineering (CAE)

Party political offices
Preceded by Wang Hansong	Communist Party Secretary of Dalian University of Technology; 2021–present	Incumbent
