= Yan Xinping =

- Born: July 1959 (age 67); Lianhua County, Jiangxi, China
- Education: Wuhan University of Technology; Xi'an Jiaotong University
- Scientific career
- Fields: Traffic engineering
- Workplaces: Wuhan University of Technology
- Doctoral advisor: Xie Youbai; Yu lie

Chinese name
- Traditional Chinese: 嚴新平
- Simplified Chinese: 严新平
Transcriptions
Standard Mandarin
- Hanyu Pinyin: Yán Xīnpíng

Yan Xinping (Chinese: 严新平; born July 1959) is a Chinese engineer and professor and doctoral supervisor at Wuhan University of Technology.

== Biography ==
Yan was born in July 1959 in Lianhua County, Jiangxi. After the resumption of National College Entrance Examination, he entered Wuhan Water Transport Engineering College (now Wuhan University of Technology), where he graduated in 1982. In 1987 he earned his Master of Science degree at Wuhan Water Transport Engineering College under the direction of Zhou Jingnan (周劲男) and Xiao Hanliang (萧汉梁). In 1997 he received his doctor's degree in Engineering from Xi'an Jiaotong University under the direction of Xie Youbai and Yu lie (虞烈).

After graduating from Wuhan Water Transport Engineering College, he taught at the university between 1982 and 1992. He taught at Wuhan University of Communications Science and Technology (now Wuhan University of Technology) since 1992, what he was promoted to associate professor in November 1992 and to full professor in November 1996. In January 1999 he was promoted to vice-president of the university, and held that office until July 2017. He has been director of National Engineering Research Center for Water Transport Safety (WTS Center) since May 2015 and director of International Scientific and Technological Cooperation Base of Intelligent Shipping and Maritime Safety since November 2016.

== Honours and awards ==
- November 22, 2019 Member of the Chinese Academy of Engineering (CAE)
