= Wu Fengchang =

Chinese engineer

- 吴丰昌
- Born: 23 August 1964 (age 62); Longyou County, Zhejiang, China
- Education: Jilin University
- Scientific career
- Fields: Environmental pollution prevention
- Workplaces: Chinese Research Academy of Environmental Sciences

Chinese name
- Simplified Chinese: 吴丰昌
- Traditional Chinese: 吳豐昌
Transcriptions
Standard Mandarin
- Hanyu Pinyin: Wú Fēngchāng

Wu Fengchang (born 23 August 1964) is a Chinese engineer who is a researcher at the Chinese Research Academy of Environmental Sciences, and an academician of the Chinese Academy of Engineering.

== Biography ==
Wu was born in Longyou County, Zhejiang, on 23 August 1964. He secondary studied at Quzhou No. 2 High School. In 1985, he was accepted to Changchun Institute of Geology (now Jilin University), graduating in 1989 with a bachelor's degree in geochemistry and exploration. He went on to receive his master's degree in 1992 and doctor's degree in 1995 at the Institute of Geochemistry, Chinese Academy of Sciences, all in environmental geochemistry.

He joined the Chinese Communist Party in August 1993. He worked at the Institute of Geochemistry, Chinese Academy of Sciences, since 1995, what he was associate research fellow in 1995 and research fellow in 2001.

In March 1997, he was recruited by McMaster University as a guest associate professor, he remained at the university until May 1999, when he was engaged by the Japan Science and Technology Agency as an overseas special researcher at Nagoya University.

Wu returned to China in 2001 and that same year became a researcher at the State Key Laboratory of Organic Geochemistry, Chinese Academy of Sciences. He was honored as a Distinguished Young Scholar by the National Science Fund for Distinguished Young Scholars in 2005. He was appointed director of the State Key Laboratory of Environmental Protection and Lake Pollution Control in January 2008 and director of the State Key Laboratory of Environmental Benchmark and Risk Assessment in May 2011.

== Honors and awards ==
- 2014 Science and Technology Progress Award of the Ho Leung Ho Lee Foundation
- 2016 National Labor Medal
- 27 November 2017 Member of the Chinese Academy of Engineering (CAE)
