= Xiao Longxu =

Chinese engineer

- Born: June 1962 (age 64); Shouguang, Shandong, China
- Education: Tsinghua University
- Scientific career
- Fields: Control theory and engineering
- Workplaces: Research Institute of People's Liberation Army Rocket Force

Chinese name
- Traditional Chinese: 肖龍旭
- Simplified Chinese: 肖龙旭
Transcriptions
Standard Mandarin
- Hanyu Pinyin: Xiāo Lóngxù

Xiao Longxu (Chinese: 肖龙旭; born June 1962) is a Chinese engineer and professor and chief designer at the Research Institute of People's Liberation Army Rocket Force. He is a member of the Chinese Communist Party.

== Biography ==
Xiao was born in Shouguang, Shandong, in June 1962. He took the National College Entrance Examination after grade ten, and earned the highest marks in his county. In 2001, he was exempted from master's degree studies and directly admitted to Tsinghua University's doctoral program.

== Honors and awards ==
- July 19, 2018 Merit Citation Class III
- November 22, 2019 Member of the Chinese Academy of Engineering (CAE)
