= Zhang Pingxiang =

Chinese engineer

- Born: March 1965 (age 61); Baoji, Shaanxi, China
- Education: Shaanxi Normal University; Northeastern University (China)
- Scientific career
- Fields: Non-ferrous metal
- Workplaces: Northwest Institute of Non-ferrous Metal Research

Chinese name
- Traditional Chinese: 張平祥
- Simplified Chinese: 张平祥
Transcriptions
Standard Mandarin
- Hanyu Pinyin: Zhāng Píngxiáng

Zhang Pingxiang (Chinese: 张平祥; born March 1965) is a Chinese engineer currently serving as president of Northwest Institute of Non-ferrous Metal Research. He has been hailed as "the pioneer of superconducting materials and applications in China".

== Biography ==
Zhang was born in Baoji, Shaanxi, in May 1963. He received his master's degree and doctor's degree from Shaanxi Normal University in 1985 and 1988, respectively. He earned his doctor's degree from Northeastern University (China) in 1996.

== Honours and awards ==
- November 22, 2019 Member of the Chinese Academy of Engineering (CAE)
