= Li Zhaoshen =

Chinese military physician

- 李兆申
- Born: 13 October 1956 (age 69); Ningjin County, Hebei, China
- Education: Naval Medical University
- Scientific career
- Fields: Gastrointestinal disease
- Workplaces: Changhai Hospital Affiliated to Naval Medical University

Li Zhaoshen (Chinese: 李兆申; pinyin: Lǐ Zhàoshēn; born 13 October 1956) is a Chinese military physician who is the director of the Digestive System Department, at Changhai Hospital Affiliated to Naval Medical University, and an academician of the Chinese Academy of Engineering.

== Biography ==
Li was born in Ningjin County, Hebei, on 13 October 1956. In 1980, he graduated from Naval Medical University and earned a master's degree in 1988.

He became the director of the National Clinical Research Center for Digestive Disease in October 2014 and director of the Shanghai Institute of Pancreatic Diseases in January 2015.

On 1 July 2019, news media exposed his academic misconduct such as suspected plagiarism of academic papers.

== Honours and awards ==
- 2010 State Science and Technology Progress Award (Second Class)
- 2013 State Science and Technology Progress Award (Second Class)
- 2018 State Science and Technology Progress Award (Second Class)
- 27 November 2017 Member of the Chinese Academy of Engineering (CAE)
