= Wang Rui (pharmacologist) =

Chinese pharmacologist

- 王锐
- Born: 25 May 1963 (age 63); Lanzhou, Gansu, China
- Education: Lanzhou University
- Scientific career
- Fields: Pharmaceutical chemistry
- Workplaces: Lanzhou University

Chinese name
- Simplified Chinese: 王锐
- Traditional Chinese: 王銳
Transcriptions
Standard Mandarin
- Hanyu Pinyin: Wáng Ruì

Wang Rui (born 25 May 1963) is a Chinese pharmacologist who is a professor, doctoral supervisor and vice president of Lanzhou University, and an academician of the Chinese Academy of Engineering.

== Biography ==
Wang was born in Lanzhou, Gansu, on 25 May 1963. He earned a bachelor's degree in 1982, a master's degree in 1985, and a doctor's degree in 1988, all from Lanzhou University and all in pharmaceutical chemistry. He was a postdoctoral fellow at the University of Kansas.

After graduating in 1985, he stayed at the university and worked successively as a lecturer, professor (1995–present), dean of Life Sciences School (1997–2006), dean of Basic Medicine School (2008–2018), and vice president (2018–present).

He was a member of the 12th National Committee of the Chinese People's Political Consultative Conference and is a member of the 13th Standing Committee of the Chinese People's Political Consultative Conference.

== Honours and awards ==
- 2016 State Technological Invention Award (Second Class)
- 2016 Science and Technology Innovation Award of the Ho Leung Ho Lee Foundation
- 27 November 2017 Member of the Chinese Academy of Engineering (CAE)
