= Yang Shuxing =

Chinese engineer and professor

- Born: November 1962 (age 63); Tangshan, Hebei, China
- Education: Beijing Institute of Technology
- Scientific career
- Fields: Aerocraft
- Workplaces: Beijing Institute of Technology

Chinese name
- Traditional Chinese: 楊樹興
- Simplified Chinese: 杨树兴
Transcriptions
Standard Mandarin
- Hanyu Pinyin: Yáng Shùxīng

Yang Shuxing (Chinese: 杨树兴; born November 1962) is a Chinese engineer and professor at Beijing Institute of Technology. He is the chief engineer of the 203 Research Institute of China Ordnance Industries Group Corporation Limited.

== Biography ==
Yang was born in Tangshan, Hebei, in November 1962. He secondary studied at Tangshan No.1 High School. He earned a bachelor's degree in 1984, a master's degree in 1987, and a doctor's degree in 1991, all from Beijing Institute of Technology. After graduation, he taught at the university, where he was appointed its vice-president in 2002.

== Honours and awards ==
- 2005 State Defense Science and Technology Award (Second Class)
- 2005 State Defense Science and Technology Award (Second Class)
- 2006 State Science and Technology Progress Award (First Class)
- 2007 State Defense Science and Technology Award (First Class)
- January 2019 State Science and Technology Progress Award (First Class)
- November 22, 2019 Member of the Chinese Academy of Engineering (CAE)
