= Qian Minggao =

Chinese mining engineer (1932–2022)

- 钱鸣高
- Born: 11 December 1932; Wuxi County, Jiangsu, China
- Died: 23 September 2022 (aged 89); Beijing, China
- Education: Northeastern University; China University of Mining and Technology
- Scientific career
- Fields: Mining engineering
- Workplaces: China University of Mining and Technology

Chinese name
- Simplified Chinese: 钱鸣高
- Traditional Chinese: 錢鳴高
Transcriptions
Standard Mandarin
- Hanyu Pinyin: Qián Mínggāo

Qian Minggao (Chinese: 钱鸣高; 11 December 1932 – 23 September 2022) was a Chinese scientist who was a professor at the China University of Mining and Technology, and an academician of the Chinese Academy of Engineering.

Qian was one of the main founders of the discipline of mine pressure and strata control in China.

== Biography ==
Qian was born in Wuxi County (now Wuxi), Jiangsu, on 11 December 1932, to a coach driver. In 1954, he graduated from Northeast Institute of Technology (now Northeastern University) majoring in mining engineering before gaining a master's degree in coal mining from Beijing Institute of Mining (now China University of Mining and Technology). After graduation, he stayed and taught there.

In January 1970, Qian became director of Mine Pressure Research Office, Sichuan Institute of Mining, a post he kept until January 1980, when he returned to China University of Mining and Technology as associate professor of the Department of Mining Engineering, and was later promoted to full professor in January 1984 than head of Department of Mining Engineering in January 1987. He joined the Chinese Communist Party (CCP) in January 1983.

On 23 September 2022, he died of an illness in Beijing, at the age of 89.

== Honours and awards ==
- 1989 State Natural Science Award (Third Class) for the activity law of overlying strata in stope
- 1995 Member of the Chinese Academy of Engineering (CAE)
- 1996 State Science and Technology Progress Award (Third Class) for the roof and support quality monitoring system in fully mechanized coal face
- 1998 State Science and Technology Progress Award (Third Class) for the surrounding rock control of coal mines in China
