= Huang Zhen (engineer) =

Chinese engineer (born 1960)

- Born: August 1960 (age 65–66); Ying County, Zhejiang, China
- Education: Shanghai Jiao Tong University
- Scientific career
- Fields: Power mechanical engineering
- Workplaces: Shanghai Jiao Tong University
- Doctoral advisor: Li Bozhong (李渤仲); Zhang Lianfang (张连方)

Chinese name
- Traditional Chinese: 黃震
- Simplified Chinese: 黄震
Transcriptions
Standard Mandarin
- Hanyu Pinyin: Huáng Zhèn

Huang Zhen (Chinese: 黄震; born August 1960) is a Chinese engineer and currently vice-president of Shanghai Jiao Tong University. He is an academician of the Chinese Academy of Engineering (CAE) and serves as vice-president of the China Association for Promoting Democracy.

== Biography ==
Huang was born into a family of intellectuals in the town of Yunlong, Ying County, Zhejiang, in August 1960. After the resumption of National College Entrance Examination, he enrolled at Shanghai Jiao Tong University, where he earned a bachelor's degree in 1982, a master's degree in 1985, and a doctor's degree in 1988. After graduation, he became an instructor at the university. He carried out postdoctoral research at Gunma University in October 1991. He returned to China in March 1993 and continued to teach at Shanghai Jiao Tong University. He served as dean of the School of Power and Energy Engineering from July 1998 to September 2000 and dean of Graduate School from January 2010 to September 2013. He became the university's vice-president in September 2013, and was re-elected in June 2018.

Huang is a member of the China Association for Promoting Democracy. In December 2017 he was elected vice-president of the Central Committee of the China Association for Promoting Democracy. On January 27, 2018, he was elected as vice-chairman of the Shanghai Municipal Committee of the Chinese People's Political Consultative Conference (CPPCC).

== Honours and awards ==
- 2000 "Chang Jiang Scholar" (or " Yangtze River Scholar")
- 2000 National Science Fund for Distinguished Young Scholars
- November 22, 2019 Member of the Chinese Academy of Engineering (CAE)
