= Wang Linfang =

Chinese molecular biologist (1929–2022)

- 王琳芳
- Born: 3 November 1929; Harbin, Heilongjiang, China
- Died: 16 October 2022 (aged 92); Beijing, China
- Education: Harbin Medical University; Peking Union Medical College
- Scientific career
- Fields: Molecular biology
- Workplaces: Institute of Basic Medical Sciences, Chinese Academy of Medical Sciences

Wang Linfang (Chinese: 王琳芳; pinyin: Wáng Línfāng; 3 November 1929 – 16 October 2022) was a Chinese molecular biologist, and an academician of the Chinese Academy of Engineering.

== Biography ==
Wang was born in Harbin, Heilongjiang, on 3 November 1929, while her ancestral home is in Ye County (now Laizhou), Shandong. In 1947, she entered Harbin Medical College (now Harbin Medical University), majoring in the Medical Department. After graduating in 1951, she worked at the college. She joined the Chinese Communist Party (CCP) in March 1954. In 1955, she was admitted to the Department of Biochemistry, Peking Union Medical College, obtaining her master's degree in 1959. In 1960, she was sent to study at Moscow Academy of Sciences on government scholarships. When she returned to China, she worked at the Institute of Experimental Medicine, Chinese Academy of Medical Sciences from January 1962 until January 1978. She joined the Institute of Basic Medical Sciences, Chinese Academy of Medical Sciences in January 1979, becoming director of the Department of Biochemistry and Molecular Biology in 1984 and director of the State Key Laboratory of Medical Molecular Biology in 1992. From 1981 to 1983, she won a postdoctoral scholarship from the Rockefeller Foundation and engaged in reproductive biology research at the Biomedical Research Center of Rockefeller University in New York City.

On 16 October 2022, she died in Beijing, at the age of 92.

== Honours and awards ==
- 1995 State Natural Science Award (Second Class)
- 1997 Member of the Chinese Academy of Engineering (CAE)
