= Zhuang Weimin =

Chinese architect

- Born: October 1962 (age 63); Shanghai, China
- Education: Tsinghua University
- Scientific career
- Fields: Architecture
- Workplaces: School of Architecture, Tsinghua University

Chinese name
- Traditional Chinese: 莊惟敏
- Simplified Chinese: 庄惟敏
Transcriptions
Standard Mandarin
- Hanyu Pinyin: Zhuāng Wéimǐn

Zhuang Weimin (Chinese: 庄惟敏; born October 1962) is a Chinese architect who is a professor and dean of the School of Architecture, Tsinghua University. He is a member of the International Union of Architects (UIA), China Green Building Association (CGBA), APEC Architect Project Monitoring Committee, Architectural Society of China (ASC), and UIA International Professional Practice Commission.

== Biography ==
Zhuang was born in Shanghai, in October 1962. In 1992 he received his doctor of engineering degree from Tsinghua University. After graduation, he taught at the university, where he was promoted to dean of the School of Architecture in 2015.

== Architectural works ==
His architectural works include the National Art Museum of China, the Swimming & Diving Gymnasium for World University Games, the Judo & Taekwondo Gymnasium and Shooting Range Hall for 2008 Beijing Olympic Games, the Century Hall of Tsinghua University, Antarctica Zhongshan Station, and the Tsinghua University Science Park's Science Park Tower.

== Honours and awards ==
- March 2009 "National Engineering Survey and Design Master" by the Ministry of Housing and Urban-Rural Development
- September 27, 2019 the 9th Liang Sicheng Architecture Award
- November 22, 2019 Member of the Chinese Academy of Engineering (CAE)

Educational offices
Preceded by Zhu Wenyi (朱文一)	Dean of the School of Architecture, Tsinghua University; 2015–present	Incumbent
