= Hu Peisong =

Chinese agronomist (born 1964)

- 胡培松
- Born: May 1964 (age 62); Tonglu County, Zhejiang, China
- Education: Zhejiang Agricultural University; Nanjing Agricultural University
- Scientific career
- Fields: Rice
- Workplaces: China National Rice Research Institute

Hu Peisong (Chinese: 胡培松; pinyin: Hú Péisōng; born May 1964) is a Chinese agronomist who is a researcher and the current president of China National Rice Research Institute.

== Biography ==
Hu was born in Tonglu County, Zhejiang, in May 1964. He attended Zhejiang Agricultural University (now Zhejiang University) where he received his bachelor's degree in 1986. After completing his master's degree at the Graduate School of Chinese Academy of Agricultural Sciences(CAAS), he attended Nanjing Agricultural University where he obtained his doctor's degree in 2002. Since 1991, he has been engaged in genetic improvement of rice quality.

== Career ==
He holds multiple key positions, serving as the Director General of CNNRI, Director of the Rice Production Quality Testing Center of the Ministry of Agriculture, Head of the China-IRRI Joint Research Center on Rice Quality and Nutrition, and leading the Rice Quality Genetic Improvement Innovation Team of CNRRI.

He serves as the Editor Board Member of Rice Science, Chinese Journal of Rice Science, and China Rice. Additionally, he holds an advisory role with the International Hybrid Rice Research and Development Consortium. His extensive expertise has led him to contribute as a Technical Cooperation Expert for the Food and Agriculture Organization of the United Nations and the International Atomic Energy Agency. In this capacity, he has conducted training and offered technical support fir numerous projects in various Asian countries.

== Honours and awards ==
- November 22, 2019 Member of the Chinese Academy of Engineering (CAE)
