= Wang Shafei =

Chinese engineer

- 王沙飞
- Born: 30 October 1964 (age 61); Zhangjiakou, Hebei, China
- Education: PLA Electronic Engineering Institute; Beijing Institute of Technology
- Scientific career
- Fields: Communication; Information systems
- Workplaces: PLA Academy of Military Science

Chinese name
- Simplified Chinese: 王沙飞
- Traditional Chinese: 王沙飛
Transcriptions
Standard Mandarin
- Hanyu Pinyin: Wáng Shāfēi

Wang Shafei (born 30 October 1964) is a Chinese engineer at the PLA Academy of Military Science, and an academician of the Chinese Academy of Engineering (CAE).

== Biography ==
Wang was born in Zhangjiakou, Hebei, on 30 October 1964. After graduating from PLA Electronic Engineering Institute in 1981, he stayed at the university and worked as an assistant. After completing his graduate work from the School of Information and Electronics, Beijing Institute of Technology in 1988, he was despatched to a research institute of the People's Liberation Army. He attained the rank of major general (shaojiang) in 2012.

== Honours and awards ==
- 2003 State Science and Technology Progress Award (Second Class)
- 2010 State Science and Technology Progress Award (Second Class)
- 2012 State Science and Technology Progress Award (Second Class)
- 2015 State Science and Technology Progress Award (Second Class)
- 27 November 2017 Member of the Chinese Academy of Engineering (CAE)
