= Huang Xianxiang =

- 黄先祥
- Born: 20 April 1940 (age 86); Rugao County, Jiangsu, China
- Education: Beijing Institute of Technology
- Scientific career
- Fields: Missile launch and application
- Workplaces: Rocket Force University of Engineering

Chinese name
- Simplified Chinese: 黄先祥
- Traditional Chinese: 黃先祥
Transcriptions
Standard Mandarin
- Hanyu Pinyin: Huáng Xiānxiáng

Huang Xianxiang (Chinese: 黄先祥; born 20 April 1940) is a Chinese missile technology expert, a major general (shaojiang) in the People's Liberation Army, and an academician of the Chinese Academy of Engineering.

== Biography ==
Huang was born in the town of Fengli, Rugao County (now Rudong County), Jiangsu, on 20 April 1940, and graduated from the Department of Aircraft Engineering, Beijing Institute of Technology in 1965. He joined the Chinese Communist Party (CCP) in May 1970. In October 1992, he was selected as a representative of the 14th National Congress of the Chinese Communist Party. He was recruited as a professor at the Rocket Force University of Engineering in 1998 and was promoted to doctoral supervisor in 2003. In March 2003, he was chosen as a member of the 10th National Committee of the Chinese People's Political Consultative Conference, and was re-elected in March 2008.

== Honours and awards ==
- 1999 Member of the Chinese Academy of Engineering (CAE)
