= Tang Hongxiao =

Chinese engineer (1931–2022)

- 汤鸿霄
- Born: 4 October 1931; Xushui County, Hebei, China
- Died: 16 December 2022 (aged 91); Beijing, China
- Education: Harbin Institute of Technology
- Scientific career
- Fields: Environmental engineering Environmental water quality
- Workplaces: Research Center for Eco-Environmental Sciences, Chinese Academy of Sciences

Chinese name
- Simplified Chinese: 汤鸿霄
- Traditional Chinese: 湯鴻宵
Transcriptions
Standard Mandarin
- Hanyu Pinyin: Tāng Hóngxiāo

Tang Hongxiao (Chinese: 汤鸿霄; 4 October 1931 – 16 December 2022) was a Chinese engineer who was a professor at the Research Center for Eco-Environmental Sciences, Chinese Academy of Sciences, and an academician of the Chinese Academy of Engineering.

== Biography ==
Tang was born in Xushui County (now Xushui District of Baoding), Hebei, on 4 October 1931. In 1950, he was admitted to Harbin Institute of Technology. He studied at the Department of Geology at the beginning, but switched to the Department of Mining (later reshuffled as Department of Civil Engineering) half a year later. After graduating in 1958, he stayed and taught there.

Tang moved to the Institute of Environmental Chemistry, Chinese Academy of Sciences as an associate research fellow in 1977. In 1984, he became a visiting scholar at the Swiss Institute of Water Resources and Water Pollution Control (now EAWAG), where he studied under Professor W. Stam. Tang returned to China in 1985 and that same year became director of the Water Pollution Chemistry Research Office, Research Center for Eco-Environmental Sciences, Chinese Academy of Sciences.

On 16 December 2022, he died from an illness in Beijing, at the age of 91.

== Honours and awards ==
- 1987 State Science and Technology Progress Award (Second Class)
- 1995 Member of the Chinese Academy of Engineering (CAE)
- 1999 Science and Technology Progress Award of the Ho Leung Ho Lee Foundation
- 2002 State Science and Technology Progress Award (Second Class) for the Principles of Environmental Interface Chemistry and Control Technology for Persistent Pollutants
- 2004 State Science and Technology Progress Award (Second Class) for the Inorganic Polymer Flocculant and High Efficiency Flocculation Technology
