= Luo An =

Luo An (罗安)
- Born: July 21, 1957 (age 69)
- Awards: Academician of the Chinese Academy of Engineering
- Scientific career
- Fields: Energy Conversion and Control

Luo An (simplified Chinese: 罗安; traditional Chinese: 羅安; pinyin: luó ān), born in Changsha of China in 1957, is an academician of the Chinese Academy of Engineering, professor at Hunan University and leader of the National Engineering Research Center for Energy Conversion and Control.

== Biography ==
In 1982, as a student of the Class of 1977 (China), Luo An graduated from Hunan University with a BSc degree in industrial electrical automation.

In 1986, graduated from Hunan University with a MSc degree in industrial electrical automation.

In 1993, graduated from Zhejiang University with a PhD degree in fluid transmission and control.

Since 2013, have been professor and director of the National Engineering Research Center for Energy Conversion and Control in Hunan University.

In 2015, was elected as an academician of the Chinese Academy of Engineering.

In 2018, was awarded National Science and Technology Progress Award, First Prize.

In 2020, was appointed counselor of the Hunan Provincial Government.

In 2023, was awarded the National Innovation Medal.

== Research achievements ==
Luo An and his research team have developed a series of high-efficiency energy conversion and control equipment, including the high-power electromagnetic stirring power supply system, the hybrid active power filter and the static VAR compensator, as well as the Electric Intelligent Monitor System, which have been widely used in complex industrial systems in the power, metallurgy and other industries. And many of Luo An's publications are indexed in SCI or EI.

== See also ==
- Academician of the Chinese Academy of Engineering
- Hunan University
- State Science and Technology Prizes
