= Wang Yunmin =

Chinese engineer

- Born: October 1955 (age 70); Dangshan County, Anhui, China
- Education: Jiangxi University of Science and Technology
- Scientific career
- Fields: Mining
- Workplaces: Sinosteel Ma'anshan Institute of Mining Research Co., Ltd.

Chinese name
- Traditional Chinese: 王運敏
- Simplified Chinese: 王运敏
Transcriptions
Standard Mandarin
- Hanyu Pinyin: Wáng Yùnmǐn

Wang Yunmin (Chinese: 王运敏; born October 1955) is a Chinese engineer and former president of Sinosteel Ma'anshan Institute of Mining Research Co., Ltd..

== Biography ==
Wang was born in Dangshan County, Anhui, in October 1955. After the resumption of National College Entrance Examination, he enrolled at Jiangxi University of Science and Technology. After graduating in 1982, he was offered a position at Ma'anshan Mine Research Institute.

== Honours and awards ==
- June 2012 Guanghua Engineering Technology Award
- November 22, 2019 Member of the Chinese Academy of Engineering (CAE)
