= Liu Yongjian =

Air force engineer

- 刘永坚
- Born: 1 November 1961 (age 64); Lengshuijiang, Hunan, China
- Education: National University of Defense Technology; Beihang University
- Scientific career
- Fields: Electronic countermeasures
- Workplaces: PLA Air Force Equipment Research Institute

Chinese name
- Simplified Chinese: 刘永坚
- Traditional Chinese: 劉永堅
Transcriptions
Standard Mandarin
- Hanyu Pinyin: Liú Yǒngjiān

Liu Yongjian (born 1 November 1961) is a Chinese engineer at the PLA Air Force Equipment Research Institute, and an academician of the Chinese Academy of Engineering (CAE).

== Biography ==
Liu was born in Lengshuijiang, Hunan, on 1 November 1961. In 1978, he was admitted to National University of Defense Technology. After graduating in 1982, he was assigned to PLA Air Force Second Research Institute. He received his doctor's degree from Beihang University in 2001. In February 2007, he became an engineer at the PLA Air Force Equipment Research Institute. In March 2018, he became a delegate to the 13th National People's Congress.

== Honours and awards ==
- 2001 State Science and Technology Progress Award (Second Class)
- 2009 State Science and Technology Progress Award (Second Class)
- 2010 Science and Technology Progress Award of the Ho Leung Ho Lee Foundation
- 2013 State Science and Technology Progress Award (Second Class)
- 27 November 2017 Member of the Chinese Academy of Engineering (CAE)
