= Yang Chunhe =

Chinese engineer (born 1962)

- Born: January 16, 1962 (age 64); Fengcheng, Jiangxi, China
- Education: Jiangxi University of Science and Technology; University of Nevada, Reno
- Scientific career
- Fields: Soil mechanics Rock mechanics
- Workplaces: Institute of Rock and Soil Mechanics, Chinese Academy of Sciences

Chinese name
- Traditional Chinese: 楊春和
- Simplified Chinese: 杨春和
Transcriptions
Standard Mandarin
- Hanyu Pinyin: Yáng Chūnhé

Yang Chunhe (Chinese: 杨春和; born 16 January 1962) is a Chinese engineer who is a researcher at the Institute of Rock and Soil Mechanics, Chinese Academy of Sciences.

== Biography ==
Yang was born in Fengcheng, Jiangxi, on January 16, 1962. He attended Rongtang High School (荣塘高级中学). He attended Jiangxi University of Science and Technology where he received his bachelor's degree in mining in 1983. After completing his master's degree at the Institute of Rock and Soil Mechanics, Chinese Academy of Sciences, he attended University of Nevada, Reno in the United States where he obtained his doctor's degree in geological engineering in 1999. After returning to China, he joined the Institute of Rock and Soil Mechanics, Chinese Academy of Sciences as a researcher.

== Honours and awards ==
- 2016 8th Guanghua Engineering Technology Award
- November 22, 2019 Member of the Chinese Academy of Engineering (CAE)
