= Qin Yukun =

Chinese engineer (1933–2023)

- 秦裕琨
- Born: 30 May 1933; Shanghai, China
- Died: 13 November 2023 (aged 90); Harbin, Heilongjiang, China
- Education: Jiaotong University; Harbin Institute of Technology
- Scientific career
- Fields: Thermal energy engineering Combustion science
- Workplaces: Harbin Institute of Technology

Qin Yukun (Chinese: 秦裕琨; pinyin: Qín Yùkūn; 30 May 1933 – 13 November 2023) was a Chinese engineer who was a professor at Harbin Institute of Technology, and an academician of the Chinese Academy of Engineering.

== Biography ==
Qin was born in Shanghai, on 30 May 1933, while his ancestral home in Yangzhou, Jiangsu. In 1949, he was accepted to the Department of Mechanical Engineering, Jiaotong University, where he graduated in 1953. In July of that same year, he entered the graduate class of the Department of Mechanical Engineering, Harbin Institute of Technology and also participated in the establishment of the Department of Boiler (later changed to Department of Thermal Energy Engineering).

After university in 1956, he stayed for teaching. He was an assistant in September 1956, lecturer in September 1961, associate professor in September 1978, and eventually professor in May 1985. He joined the Chinese Communist Party (CCP) in November 1981. He was made director and party branch secretary of the Department of Power Engineering in March 1987 and subsequently dean in May 1990. He rose to become vice president of the institute in October 1990.

On 13 November 2023, he died of an illness in Harbin, Heilongjiang, at the age of 90.

== Honours and awards ==
- 1985 State Science and Technology Progress Award (Third Class) for the development of a 130t/h fluidized bed boiler for power generation.
- 2000 State Technological Invention Award (Second Class) for the risk controlled combustion technology for thick and thin coal powder.
- 2001 Member of the Chinese Academy of Engineering (CAE)
- 2015 State Technological Invention Award (Second Class) for the high performance center feeding swirl coal powder combustion technology.
