= Zhang Yong (agronomist) =

Chinese agronomist

- Born: March 1956 (age 70); Horinger County, Inner Mongolia, China
- Education: Inner Mongolia Agricultural University; Northwest Agricultural University
- Scientific career
- Fields: Agronomy
- Workplaces: Northwest A&F University

Chinese name
- Traditional Chinese: 張湧
- Simplified Chinese: 张涌
Transcriptions
Standard Mandarin
- Hanyu Pinyin: Zhāng Yǒng

Zhang Yong (Chinese: 张涌; born March 1956) is a Chinese agronomist who is a professor and doctoral supervisor at Northwest A&F University. His scientific pursuits integrated the fields of animal cloning, transgenic technique and animal embryo engineering.

== Biography ==
Zhang was born in Horinger County, Inner Mongolia, in March 1956. He received his bachelor's degree from Inner Mongolia Institute of Agriculture& Animal Husbandry (now Inner Mongolia Agricultural University) in 1982, and his master's degree and doctor's degree from Northwest Agricultural University (now Northwest A&F University) in 1984 and 1990, respectively. After graduation, he was offered a faculty position at the Department of Veterinary Medicine of the university.

== Honours and awards ==
- November 22, 2019 Member of the Chinese Academy of Engineering (CAE)
