= Zhang Jun (engineer) =

Chinese aviation traffic engineering academic (born 1965)

- Born: July 1965 (age 61); Hefei, Anhui, China
- Education: Beihang University (BS in 1987; MS in 1990; PhD in 2001)
- Occupation: engineer
- Awards: Distinguished Professor

Zhang Jun (Chinese: 张军, born July 30, 1965) is a Chinese aviation traffic engineering expert and academician of the Chinese Academy of Engineering. Originally from Yuechi, Sichuan, he was born in Hefei, Anhui. He previously served as Party Secretary of Beihang University and President of Beijing Institute of Technology (BIT). He is currently the Party Secretary of BIT.

== Biography ==
Zhang Jun earned his bachelor's degree in 1987, Master's degree in 1990, and Doctoral degree in 2001, all in engineering from Beihang University.

In November 2014, he was appointed Deputy committee Secretary and Vice President of Beihang University. In September 2015, he became Party Secretary of Beihang University.

In December 2017, he was appointed president and Deputy Party Secretary of Beijing Institute of Technology.

In April 2022, he transitioned to the role of Party Secretary of Beijing Institute of Technology.

== Honors ==
- Elected as an academician of the Chinese Academy of Engineering in 2013.
- Distinguished Professor of the Changjiang Scholars Program, Ministry of Education of China.
