= Sun Cong =

Chinese aviation engineer (born 1961)

Sun Cong (Chinese: 孙聪; born February 14, 1961) is a Chinese aviation engineer, deputy designer with Aviation Industry Corporation of China and Chief Designer of the Shenyang FC-31 Shenyang J-15 fighters.
