= Xu Cheng'en =

- 徐承恩
- Born: 21 January 1927; Zhuji County, Zhejiang, China
- Died: 3 December 2023 (aged 96); Beijing, China
- Education: Zhejiang University
- Scientific career
- Fields: Refinery process design
- Workplaces: Beijing Design Institute; Chinese Academy of Engineering

Xu Cheng'en (Chinese: 徐承恩; pinyin: Xú Chéng'ēn; 21 January 1927 – 3 November 2023) was a Chinese refinery process design engineer, and an academician of the Chinese Academy of Engineering. He was a member of the Chinese Communist Party.

== Biography ==
Xu was born in Zhuji County, Zhejiang, on 21 January 1927. In 1945, he was admitted to Zhejiang University.

After graduating in May 1949, he became a member of the Jinzhou Synthetic Plant, which is the first coal refinery in China. In January 1953, he was transferred to the Northeast Petroleum Management Bureau to work due to his outstanding work. In May, he joined the Petroleum Design Bureau of the Ministry of Petroleum and worked at the Beijing Design Institute, where he was promoted to deputy chief engineer in January 1965 and was promoted again to president in January 1984.

On 3 November 2023, he died in Beijing, at the age of 96.

== Honours and awards ==
- 1994 Member of the Chinese Academy of Engineering (CAE)
