= Cao Yaofeng =

Chinese business executive

- 曹耀峰
- Born: 12 December 1953 (age 72); Weinan, Shaanxi, China
- Education: China University of Petroleum
- Scientific career
- Fields: Petroleum development
- Workplaces: China Petrochemical Corporation

Cao Yaofeng (Chinese: 曹耀峰; pinyin: Cáo Yàofēng; born 12 December 1953) is a Chinese business executive who served as deputy general manager of China Petrochemical Corporation from 2005 to 2014. He is an academician of the Chinese Academy of Engineering. He is one of the main pioneers of large-scale safety and environmental protection development of ultra deep and high acid gas reservoirs in China. As of September 2021 he was under investigation by the Central Commission for Discipline Inspection.

== Biography ==
Cao was born in Weinan, Shaanxi, on 12 December 1953. He entered the workforce in December 1969, and joined the Chinese Communist Party in February 1976. In 1977, he graduated from East China Petroleum Institute (now China University of Petroleum), majoring in mining machine.

Beginning in December 1969, he served in several posts in Shengli Oil Field, including worker, deputy chief engineer (1990–1997), general manager (2001–2002), and chairman (2002–2004). In October 2004, he was appointed general manager assistant of China Petrochemical Corporation, one year later, he rose to become deputy general manager, serving in the post until his retirement in July 2014.

=== Downfall ===
On 1 September 2021, he was placed under investigation for "serious violations of laws and regulations" by the Central Commission for Discipline Inspection (CCDI), the party's internal disciplinary body, and the National Supervisory Commission, the highest anti-corruption agency of China.

== Honors and awards ==
- 2012 State Science and Technology Progress Award (Special Prize)
- 2013 Member of the Chinese Academy of Engineering (CAE)
