= Fan Guobin =

Chinese engineer

- 范国滨
- Born: 23 April 1958 (age 68); Beijing, China
- Education: National University of Defense Technology; Xidian University
- Scientific career
- Fields: High energy laser technology
- Workplaces: China Academy of Engineering Physics

Chinese name
- Simplified Chinese: 范国滨
- Traditional Chinese: 范國濱
Transcriptions
Standard Mandarin
- Hanyu Pinyin: Fàn Guóbīn

Fan Guobin (born 23 April 1958) is a Chinese engineer at China Academy of Engineering Physics, and an academician of the Chinese Academy of Engineering.

== Biography ==
Fan was born into a military family in Beijing, on 23 April 1958. He attended Deyu Primary School (德育小学). He elementary and secondary studied at the First Middle School of Changsha. After resuming the college entrance examination, he was accepted to National University of Defense Technology, where he graduated in 1982. He earned his doctor's degree from Xidian University in 2005.

After graduating in 1982, he was despatched to the China Academy of Engineering Physics. On 17 January 2019, he was engaged by Southwest University of Science and Technology as honorary dean of the School of Economics and Management.

== Honours and awards ==
- 1997 State Science and Technology Progress Award (Second Class)
- 2009 State Science and Technology Progress Award (First Class)
- 2011 State Science and Technology Progress Award (Second Class)
- 2014 State Science and Technology Progress Award (First Class)
- 27 November 2017 Member of the Chinese Academy of Engineering (CAE)
