= Deng Mingjiang =

Chinese engineer

- 邓铭江
- Born: 18 June 1960 (age 66); Leiyang County, Hunan, China
- Education: Xinjiang Agricultural University; Hohai University
- Scientific career
- Fields: Water conservation
- Workplaces: Erqisi River Basin Development and Construction Administration

Chinese name
- Simplified Chinese: 邓铭江
- Traditional Chinese: 鄧銘江
Transcriptions
Standard Mandarin
- Hanyu Pinyin: Dèng Míngjiāng

Deng Mingjiang (born 18 June 1960) is a Chinese water conservation engineer who is the director of Erqisi River Basin Development and Construction Administration, and an academician of the Chinese Academy of Engineering.

== Biography ==
Deng was born in Leiyang County, Hunan, on 18 June 1960. He earned his Bachelor of Engineering degree from Xinjiang Agricultural University in 1982 and a Doctor of Engineering degree from Hohai University 2007.

In February 2015, he became the Vice President of the Science and Technology Association of Xinjiang Uygur Autonomous Region. On 15 May 2018, he was appointed as a tenured professor and doctoral supervisor at Xinjiang Agricultural University.

== Honours and awards ==
- 2009 State Science and Technology Progress Award (Second Class)
- 2014 State Science and Technology Progress Award (Second Class)
- 27 November 2017 Member of the Chinese Academy of Engineering (CAE)
