= Zhao Wenzhi =

Chinese petroleum geologist and explorer (born 1958)

Zhao Wenzhi (Chinese: 赵文智; born August 1958) is a Chinese petroleum geologist and explorer who has made contributions to the theories and discoveries of lithology-related hydrocarbon accumulations with large scale, natural gas relaying generation in high to over mature geothermal evolutional stage, Jurassic coal measure-derived hydrocarbon reservoirs, and sag-wide oil-bearing distribution, etc. He is an academician of the Chinese Academy of Engineering. He is the President of PetroChina Research Institute of Petroleum Exploration and Development (RIPED), and Deputy General Manager of PetroChina Exploration & Production Company. Zhao was voted one of China's top 35 scientists in 2007 and ranked 14.

== Biography ==
Zhao received his BS degree in Petroleum Geology in 1982 from Northwest University in Xi’an. He then studied at the Research Institute of Petroleum Exploration & Development (RIPED), where he completed his MS in 1984. He joined the faculty of the institute afterwards. Zhao gained his PhD in Mineral Resource Prospecting and Exploration from RIPED in 2003.

Zhao has been engaged in the research on oil and gas accumulation & distribution theory as well as exploration practice in onshore China for nearly 30 years. He has accumulated rich experience and knowledge in hydrocarbon generation, accumulation and distribution in the superimposed petroliferous basins, petroleum resources evaluation and play assessments, petroleum system analysis and strategic study on the future oil & gas supply and demand in China.

His first major contribution, made in the late 1980s, was about the distribution patterns of Jurassic coal measure-derived hydrocarbon reservoirs in Turpan-Hami basin in NW China, which help to propose the favorable exploration regions and targets that led to the breakthrough of commercial oil flow from the Jurassic interval after nearly 30 years of exploration stop. Afterwards, he put forth the new geological theories like natural gas relaying generation, sag-wide oil-bearing distribution and lithology-related reservoirs with large-scale, etc. These concepts have been widely applied to the exploration practice in the past 10 years, which made great contributions in discovering several large oil/gas fields particularly in the hydrocarbon-rich source kitchen areas of Ordos, Songliao, Tarim and Sichuan basins in onshore China.

Zhao has published over 100 technical papers both at home and abroad so far. He is also the first author of 6 academic books. Zhao has received several honorable and scientific & technological awards for his contributions, among them the Prize for Outstanding Young Scientists of Sun Yueqi Foundation (1994), the Golden Hammer Medal of China Geological Society (1994), National Early Career Awards for Scientists and Engineers (1998), Li Siguang Geological Science Medal (2003), the First Prize of National Scientific and Technological Progress Award (2007), the Prize for Energy Technological Achievements of Sun Yue-qi Foundation (2007), the Prize for Scientific and Technological Innovation of Ho Leung Ho Lee Foundation (2009).

Zhao is currently holding as the chairperson of the Petroleum Geology Committee of Chinese Petroleum Society; member of China National Committee for ICGP (UNESCO International Geological Correlation Program) and adjunct professor of Northwestern University, China University of Petroleum, and Jilin University. He served two terms (2001–2011) as chief scientist of natural gas project of the State Basic Research Program of China (also called 973 Program).

== Books ==
- Introduction to Comprehensive Study of Petroleum Geology, 1999, ISBN 7502125418
- Basic Research on High-efficiency Gas Reservoir Formation and Distribution & Economic Development for Condensate low-efficiency Gas Reservoir, 2008, ISBN 9787030208224
- Paleo-Marine Petroleum Geology in China and Superimposed Petroliferous Basins, 2002, ISBN 7116035370
- Large-scale Accumulation and Distribution of Medium-low Abundance Hydrocarbon Resources in China, 2013, ISBN 9787030373083
- New Progress of Petroleum Geological Theory and Methodology, 2006, ISBN 9787502153816
- Basic Features and Evaluation Methodology of Petroleum System in China, 2004, ISBN 7030121686
