= Long Yuqiu =

Chinese civil engineer (1926–2022)

- 龙驭球
- Born: 15 January 1926; Anhua County, Hunan, China
- Died: 22 December 2022 (aged 96); Beijing, China
- Education: Southwest Jiaotong University; National Southwestern Associated University; Tsinghua University
- Scientific career
- Fields: Civil engineering Structural mechanics
- Workplaces: Tsinghua University

Chinese name
- Simplified Chinese: 龙驭球
- Traditional Chinese: 龍馭球
Transcriptions
Standard Mandarin
- Hanyu Pinyin: Lóng Yùqiú

Long Yuqiu (Chinese: 龙驭球; 15 January 1926 – 22 December 2022) was a Chinese engineer who was a professor at Tsinghua University, and an academician of the Chinese Academy of Engineering.

== Biography ==
Long was born in Anhua County, Hunan, on 15 January 1926. In 1944, he was admitted to Tangshan Jiaotong University (now Southwest Jiaotong University), and transferred to National Southwestern Associated University a year later. In 1946, he entered Tsinghua University, where he majored in the Department of Civil Engineering.

After graduating in 1948, Long stayed at the university and worked successively as assistant research fellow, assistant (1949), instructor (1952), and professor (1978). During the Cultural Revolution, he was sent to the May Seventh Cadre Schools to do farm works in Liyuzhou Farm in the suburb of Nanchang, Jiangxi province.

On 22 December 2022, Long died in Beijing, at the age of 96.

== Honours and awards ==
- 1994 State Science and Technology Progress Award (Second Class)
- 1995 Member of the Chinese Academy of Engineering (CAE)
