= Ren Hongqiang =

Chinese environmentalist (born 1964)

- Born: May 1964 (age 62); Zhuozhou, Hebei, China
- Education: Hebei University of Science and Technology; North China Electric Power University; Jiangnan University
- Scientific career
- Fields: Environmental Engineering
- Workplaces: Nanjing University

Chinese name
- Traditional Chinese: 任洪強
- Simplified Chinese: 任洪强
Transcriptions
Standard Mandarin
- Hanyu Pinyin: Rén Hóngqiáng

Ren Hongqiang (Chinese: 任洪强; born May 1964) is a Chinese environmentalist currently serving as dean of the School of the Environment of Nanjing University.

== Biography ==
Ren was born in Zhuozhou, Hebei, in May 1964. In 1990 he graduated from Hebei University of Science and Technology. He earned his master's degree in thermal power from North China Electric Power University in 1997 and his doctor's degree in fermentation engineering from Jiangnan University in 2000, respectively. He was a postdoctoral fellow at Nanjing University between 2001 and 2002. In 2003 he became a professor and doctoral supervisor at Nanjing University.

== Honours and awards ==
- 2012 "Chang Jiang Scholar" (or " Yangtze River Scholar")
- 2014 Science and Technology Progress Award of the Ho Leung Ho Lee Foundation
- November 22, 2019 Member of the Chinese Academy of Engineering (CAE)
