= Han Dakuang =

Chinese engineer

- 韩大匡
- Born: 26 November 1932; Shanghai, China
- Died: 23 October 2023 (aged 90); Beijing, China
- Education: Tsinghua University
- Spouse: Li Shuqin
- Scientific career
- Fields: Oil Field development engineering
- Workplaces: Sinopec Petroleum Exploration and Development Research Institute

Chinese name
- Simplified Chinese: 韩大匡
- Traditional Chinese: 韓大匡
Transcriptions
Standard Mandarin
- Hanyu Pinyin: Hán Dàkuāng

Han Dakuang (Chinese: 韩大匡; 26 November 1932 – 23 October 2023) was a Chinese oilfield development engineer, and an academician of the Chinese Academy of Engineering.

== Biography ==
Han was born in Shanghai, on 26 November 1932, while his ancestral home in Hangzhou, Zhejiang. His father was an editor at Zhonghua Book Company. He attended Jinyuan High School (晋元中学). In 1950, he enrolled at the Department of Petroleum, Tsinghua University. In 1953, with the nationwide adjustment of university and college departments, he and his petroleum department was transferred to the newly created Beijing Institute of Petroleum (now China University of Petroleum), which is the first petroleum university in China. He joined the Chinese Communist Party (CCP) in December 1951.

After University in 1953, he stayed at the university and worked as deputy director of the Department of Petroleum Development and director of the Development Research Office. In 1960, he was transferred to Northeast China to participate in oilfield analysis and scheme calculation work in the Daqing Oilfield Production Experimental Zone. During the Cultural Revolution, he was sent to the May Seventh Cadre Schools to do farm works. He moved up the ranks to become director of the Development Research Office of the Sinopec Petroleum Exploration and Development Research Institute in December 1972 and chief engineer in April 1985.

On 23 October 2023, he died of an illness in Beijing, at the age of 90.

== Personal life ==
Han married Li Shuqin (李淑勤).

== Honours and awards ==
- 2001 Member of the Chinese Academy of Engineering (CAE)
