= Zhang Xiaoye =

Chinese meteorologist

- Born: June 1963 (age 63); Beijing, China
- Education: Northwest University (China); Nanjing University
- Scientific career
- Fields: Meteorology
- Workplaces: Chinese Academy of Meteorological Sciences

Chinese name
- Traditional Chinese: 張小曳
- Simplified Chinese: 张小曳
Transcriptions
Standard Mandarin
- Hanyu Pinyin: Zhāng Xiǎoyè

Zhang Xiaoye (Chinese: 张小曳; born June 1963) is a Chinese meteorologist who is a researcher and doctoral supervisor at the Chinese Academy of Meteorological Sciences.

== Biography ==
Zhang was born in Beijing, in June 1963. He obtained his Bachelor of Science degree from Northwest University (China) in 1986 and his Doctor of Science degree from Nanjing University in 1995. In April of that same year, he became a researcher at the Chinese Academy of Sciences (CAS). He was a visiting scholar at the University of Rhode Island, University of Hawaii, and University of New Mexico. He once served as deputy director of Institute of Earth Environment, Chinese Academy of Sciences and vice-president of Chinese Academy of Meteorological Sciences.

== Honours and awards ==
- 1998 National Science Fund for Distinguished Young Scholars
- 2001 National Science Fund for Distinguished Young Scholars
- November 22, 2019 Member of the Chinese Academy of Engineering (CAE)
