= Tan Jiubin =

Chinese engineer

- 谭久彬
- Born: 5 March 1955 (age 71); Harbin, Heilongjiang, China
- Education: Harbin Institute of Technology
- Scientific career
- Fields: Precision measurement Instrument engineering
- Workplaces: Harbin Institute of Technology

Chinese name
- Simplified Chinese: 谭久彬
- Traditional Chinese: 譚久彬
Transcriptions
Standard Mandarin
- Hanyu Pinyin: Tán Jiǔbīn

Tan Jiubin (born 5 March 1955) is a Chinese engineer who is a professor at Harbin Institute of Technology, and an academician of the Chinese Academy of Engineering.

== Biography ==
Tan was born in Harbin, Heilongjiang, on 5 March 1955. He earned a bachelor's degree in 1982, a master's degree in 1987, and a doctor's degree in 1991, all from Harbin Institute of Technology.

Tan taught at his alma mater since 1982, what he was promoted to associate professor in 1991 and to full professor in 1995. In 1996, he became a visiting scholar at École Polytechnique Fédérale de Lausanne.

== Honours and awards ==
- 1997 State Science and Technology Progress Award (Third Class)
- 1999 State Science and Technology Progress Award (First Class)
- 2002 State Science and Technology Progress Award (First Class)
- 2005 State Science and Technology Progress Award (First Class)
- 2006 State Technological Invention Award (First Class)
- 2013 State Technological Invention Award (Second Class)
- 2016 State Technological Invention Award (Second Class)
- 27 November 2017 Member of the Chinese Academy of Engineering (CAE)
