= Yue Qingrui =

Chinese structural engineer

Yue Ruiqing
- 岳清瑞
- Born: 2 January 1962 (age 64); Qiqihar, Heilongjiang, China
- Education: Tsinghua University; China Europe International Business School
- Scientific career
- Fields: Structural engineering
- Workplaces: University of Science and Technology Beijing

Yue Ruiqing (Chinese: 岳清瑞; pinyin: Yuè Ruìqīng; born 2 January 1962) is a Chinese structural engineer who is dean of Urbanization and Urban Safety School, University of Science and Technology Beijing, and an academician of the Chinese Academy of Engineering. He was chairman of MCC Construction Research Institute Co., Ltd. and China Steel Construction Society.

== Biography ==
Yue was born in Qiqihar, Heilongjiang, on 2 January 1962. He attended Tsinghua University where he received his Bachelor of Engineering degree in 1985. After completing his Master of Engineering degree at General Institute of Architecture, Ministry of Metallurgical Industry, in 1988, he attended China Europe International Business School where he obtained his EMBA in 2011.

He was chairman of MCC Construction Research Institute Co., Ltd. and president of China Steel Construction Society. On 26 November 2020, he was engaged by University of Science and Technology Beijing as founding dean of Urbanization and Urban Safety School.

== Honours and awards ==
- 27 November 2017 Member of the Chinese Academy of Engineering (CAE)
