= Wang Hanzhong =

Chinese genetic engineer

- 王汉中
- Born: 27 December 1963 (age 62); Lianyuan County, Hunan, China
- Education: Huazhong Agricultural University
- Scientific career
- Fields: Rapeseed genetics and breeding
- Workplaces: Chinese Academy of Agricultural Sciences

Chinese name
- Simplified Chinese: 王汉中
- Traditional Chinese: 王漢中
Transcriptions
Standard Mandarin
- Hanyu Pinyin: Wáng Hànzhōng

Wang Hanzhong (born 27 December 1963) is a Chinese rapeseed genetics and breeding engineer who is vice president of Chinese Academy of Agricultural Sciences, deputy leader of the Expert Steering Group for Whole Process Mechanization of Crop Production, Ministry of Agriculture and Rural Areas, and an academician of the Chinese Academy of Engineering.

== Biography ==
Wang was born in the town of Longtang in Lianyuan County, Hunan, on 27 December 1963. He earned a bachelor's degree in 1984, a master's degree in 1987, and a doctor's degree in 1990, all from Huazhong Agricultural University and all in crop genetic and breeding.

He was despatched to the Chinese Academy of Agricultural Sciences in July 1990, becoming director of the Institute of Oil Crops in August 1994 and director in June 1999. After this office was terminated in December 2014, he moved up the ranks to become vice president, concurrently serving as deputy leader of the Expert Steering Group for Whole Process Mechanization of Crop Production, Ministry of Agriculture and Rural Areas since May 2021.

== Honours and awards ==
- 2006 State Science and Technology Progress Award (Second Class)
- 2014 State Technological Invention Award (Second Class)
- 27 November 2017 Member of the Chinese Academy of Engineering (CAE)
