= Liu Shaojun =

Chinese ichthyologist

- Born: July 1962 (age 64); Changsha, Hunan, China
- Education: Hunan Normal University; Sun Yat-sen University
- Scientific career
- Fields: Fish
- Workplaces: Hunan Normal University

Chinese name
- Traditional Chinese: 劉少軍
- Simplified Chinese: 刘少军
Transcriptions
Standard Mandarin
- Hanyu Pinyin: Liú Shàojūn

Liu Shaojun (Chinese: 刘少军; born July 1962) is a Chinese ichthyologist, professor and doctoral supervisor at Hunan Normal University.

== Biography ==
Liu was born in Changsha, Hunan, in July 1962. His father Liu Yun was a ichthyologist, professor and academician Chinese Academy of Engineering. His mother Hu Yunjin (胡运瑾) was also a professor at Hunan Normal University. He attended the High School Attached to Hunan Normal University. He received his bachelor's degree and master's degree from Hunan Normal University in 1986 and 1989, respectively. After graduation, he was offered a faculty position at the university. From 1998 to 1999 he worked in France. In 2000 he obtained his doctor's degree from Sun Yat-sen University.

== Work ==
- 鱼类远缘杂交 [Fish Distant Hybridization] (in Chinese). Beijing: Science Press. 2017. ISBN 9787030420695.

== Honours and awards ==
- 2003 State Science and Technology Progress Award (Second Class)
- 2007 National Science Fund for Distinguished Young Scholars
- 2011 State Science and Technology Progress Award (Second Class)
- 2018 National Labor Medal
- 2018 State Science and Technology Progress Award (Second Class)
- November 22, 2019 Member of the Chinese Academy of Engineering (CAE)
