= Chen Wenxing =

Chinese textile engineer

- 陈文兴

President of Zhejiang Sci-Tech University
- Incumbent
- Assumed office June 2016
- Preceded by: Qiu Songliang

Personal details
- Born: December 1964 (age 61) Shaoxing, Zhejiang, China
- Party: Chinese Communist Party
- Education: Zhejiang University; Shinshu University
- Scientific career
- Fields: Spinning
- Workplaces: Zhejiang Sci-Tech University

Chinese name
- Traditional Chinese: 陳文興
- Simplified Chinese: 陈文兴
Transcriptions
Standard Mandarin
- Hanyu Pinyin: Chén Wénxīng

Chen Wenxing (born December 1964) is a Chinese textile engineer currently serving as president and deputy party chief of Zhejiang Sci-Tech University.

== Biography ==
Chen was born in December 1964 in Shaoxing, Zhejiang. He earned a bachelor's degree in silk making in 1987, a master's degree in silk engineering in 1987, and a Doctor of Science degree in 1999, all from Zhejiang Sci-Tech University. In August 1992, he went to Shinshu University to study at the expense of international students prizes offered by Yue-Kong Pao and Doreen Pao. He was a visiting research fellow at Kyoto Institute of Technology between June 2000 and January 2001. In September 2010 he was appointed vice-president of Zhejiang Sci-Tech University, six years later, he was promoted to the president position.

== Honors and awards ==
- 2018 Science and Technology Progress Award of the Ho Leung Ho Lee Foundation
- November 22, 2019 Member of the Chinese Academy of Engineering (CAE)

Educational offices
Preceded by Qiu Songliang	President of Zhejiang Sci-Tech University; 2016	Incumbent
