= Liu Zejin =

Chinese engineer

- 刘泽金
- Born: 21 October 1963 (age 62); Wudi County, Shandong, China
- Education: Shandong University; National University of Defense Technology
- Scientific career
- Fields: High power laser system and technology
- Workplaces: National University of Defense Technology

Chinese name
- Simplified Chinese: 刘泽金
- Traditional Chinese: 劉澤金
Transcriptions
Standard Mandarin
- Hanyu Pinyin: Liú Zéjīn

Liu Zejin (born 21 October 1963) is a Chinese engineer who is a professor and vice president of National University of Defense Technology.

== Biography ==
Liu was born in Wudi County, Shandong, on 21 October 1963. In 1979, he was accepted to Shandong University. After graduating in 1983, he joined the faculty of the Department of Applied Physics, National University of Defense Technology. He earned his master's degree and doctor's degree from National University of Defense Technology in 1989 and 1997, respectively. In December 1999, he became deputy director of Directional Energy Technology Institute, rising to director in March 2001. He was deputy dean of the College of Science from 2002 to 2004, and he became deputy dean of the College of Optoelectronic Science and Engineering in June 2004 and dean in December 2007. He became head of Scientific Research Department in March 2013, and served until June 2017, when he was promoted to vice president of the university.

== Honours and awards ==
- 2008 State Science and Technology Progress Award (Second Class)
- 2010 State Science and Technology Progress Award (Second Class)
- 2014 State Science and Technology Progress Award (First Class)
- November 27, 2017 Member of the Chinese Academy of Engineering (CAE)
- November 2020 Science and Technology Progress Award of the Ho Leung Ho Lee Foundation
