= Li Peiwu =

Chinese agronomist

- Born: November 1961 (age 64); Chengwu County, Shandong, China
- Education: Nanjing Agricultural University
- Scientific career
- Fields: Agriculture
- Workplaces: Oil Crops Research Institute (OCRI) of the Chinese Academy of Agricultural Sciences (CAAS)

Li Peiwu (Chinese: 李培武; pinyin: Lǐ Péiwǔ; born November 1961) is a Chinese agronomist who is a researcher at the Oil Crops Research Institute (OCRI) of the Chinese Academy of Agricultural Sciences (CAAS).

== Biography ==
Li was born in Chengwu County, Shandong, in November 1961. After graduating from Nanjing Agricultural University in 1986, he was offered a faculty position at the Oil Crops Research Institute (OCRI) of the Chinese Academy of Agricultural Sciences (CAAS).

== Honours and awards ==
- November 22, 2019 Member of the Chinese Academy of Engineering (CAE)
