= Hou Xianglin =

Chinese chemist (1912–2008)

Hou Xianglin (Chinese: 侯祥麟; April 4, 1912 – December 8, 2008) was a Chinese chemist. He was a member of the Chinese Academy of Sciences.
