= Bao Zhenmin =

Chinese marine biologist

- 包振民
- Born: 27 December 1961 (age 64); Yantai, Shandong, China
- Education: Ocean University of China
- Scientific career
- Fields: Shellfish genetics and breeding
- Workplaces: Marine Life Sciences School, Ocean University of China

Bao Zhenmin (Chinese: 包振民; pinyin: Bāo Zhèngmín; born 27 December 1961) is a Chinese marine biologist who is dean of the Marine Life Sciences School, Ocean University of China, and an academician of the Chinese Academy of Engineering.

== Biography ==
Bao was born in Yantai, Shandong, on 27 December 1961. After high school, he studied, then taught, at what is now the Ocean University of China. In 1997, he earned his doctor's degree in aquaculture science from Qingdao University of Oceanology (now Ocean University of China). In December 1997, he became deputy dean of the Marine Life Sciences School, Ocean University of China, rising to dean in 2011.

== Honours and awards ==
- 2001 State Science and Technology Progress Award (Second Class)
- 2008 State Science and Technology Progress Award (Second Class)
- 2015 State Science and Technology Progress Award (Second Class)
- 27 November 2017 Member of the Chinese Academy of Engineering (CAE)
- 2018 State Technological Invention Award (Second Class)
