= Jiang Xingwei =

Chinese satellite engineer

- 蒋兴伟
- Born: 18 March 1959 (age 67); Tianjin, China
- Education: Ocean University of China
- Scientific career
- Fields: Ocean satellite
- Workplaces: National Satellite Ocean Application Service

Chinese name
- Simplified Chinese: 蒋兴伟
- Traditional Chinese: 蔣興偉
Transcriptions
Standard Mandarin
- Hanyu Pinyin: Jiǎng Xīngwěi

Jiang Xingwei (born 18 March 1959) is a Chinese satellite engineer who is a researcher and director of the National Satellite Ocean Application Service, and an academician of the Chinese Academy of Engineering.

== Biography ==
Jiang was born in Tianjin, on 18 March 1959, while his ancestral home in Junan County, Shandong. In 1978, he enrolled at Shandong Institute of Oceanology (now Ocean University of China), majoring in marine hydrology.

After graduating in 1982, he was despatched to the National Marine Data and Information Service, where he was associate research fellow in 1989 and research fellow in 1995. He joined the Chinese Communist Party in May 1986. In March 1988, he became a visiting scholar at the National Oceanographic Data Center, he remained at there until December 1988. In April 1999, he moved to the National Satellite Ocean Application Service, where he successively served as deputy director, director, and chief engineer.

On 15 March 2018, he became a member of the 13th National Committee of the Chinese People's Political Consultative Conference.

== Honours and awards ==
- 2005 State Science and Technology Progress Award (Second Class)
- 2010 State Science and Technology Progress Award (Second Class)
- 2013 State Science and Technology Progress Award (Second Class)
- 27 November 2017 Member of the Chinese Academy of Engineering (CAE)
