= Zhu Lizhong =

Chinese environmental engineer

- 朱利中
- Born: 19 October 1959 (age 66); Shangyu County, Zhejiang, China
- Education: Zhejiang University
- Scientific career
- Fields: Environmental engineering
- Workplaces: Zhejiang University

Zhu Lizhong (Chinese: 朱利中; pinyin: Zhū Lìzhōng; born 19 October 1959) is a Chinese environmental engineer who is a professor at Zhejiang University, and an academician of the Chinese Academy of Engineering.

== Biography ==
Zhu was born in Shangyu County, Zhejiang, on 19 October 1959. He secondary studied at Lihai High School (沥海中学高中部) and Chunhui High School (春晖中学). In 1978, he was admitted to Hangzhou University (now Zhejiang University), majoring in chemistry.

He joined the Chinese Communist Party in April 1985. In September 1990, he went to study at the University of British Columbia in Canada. In September 1996, he was hired by the University of Shizuoka as a guest professor. In December 2000, he became a visiting scholar at the United States Geological Survey, a position in which he remained until March 2001. He was honored as a Distinguished Young Scholar by the National Science Fund for Distinguished Young Scholars in 2001. In 2006, he joined the faculty of Zhejiang University.

== Honors and awards ==
- 2007 State Science and Technology Progress Award (Second Class)
- 2013 State Natural Science Award (Second Class)
- 2015 Member of the Royal Society of Chemistry
- 27 November 2017 Member of the Chinese Academy of Engineering (CAE)
