= Tang Lixin =

Chinese engineer

- 唐立新
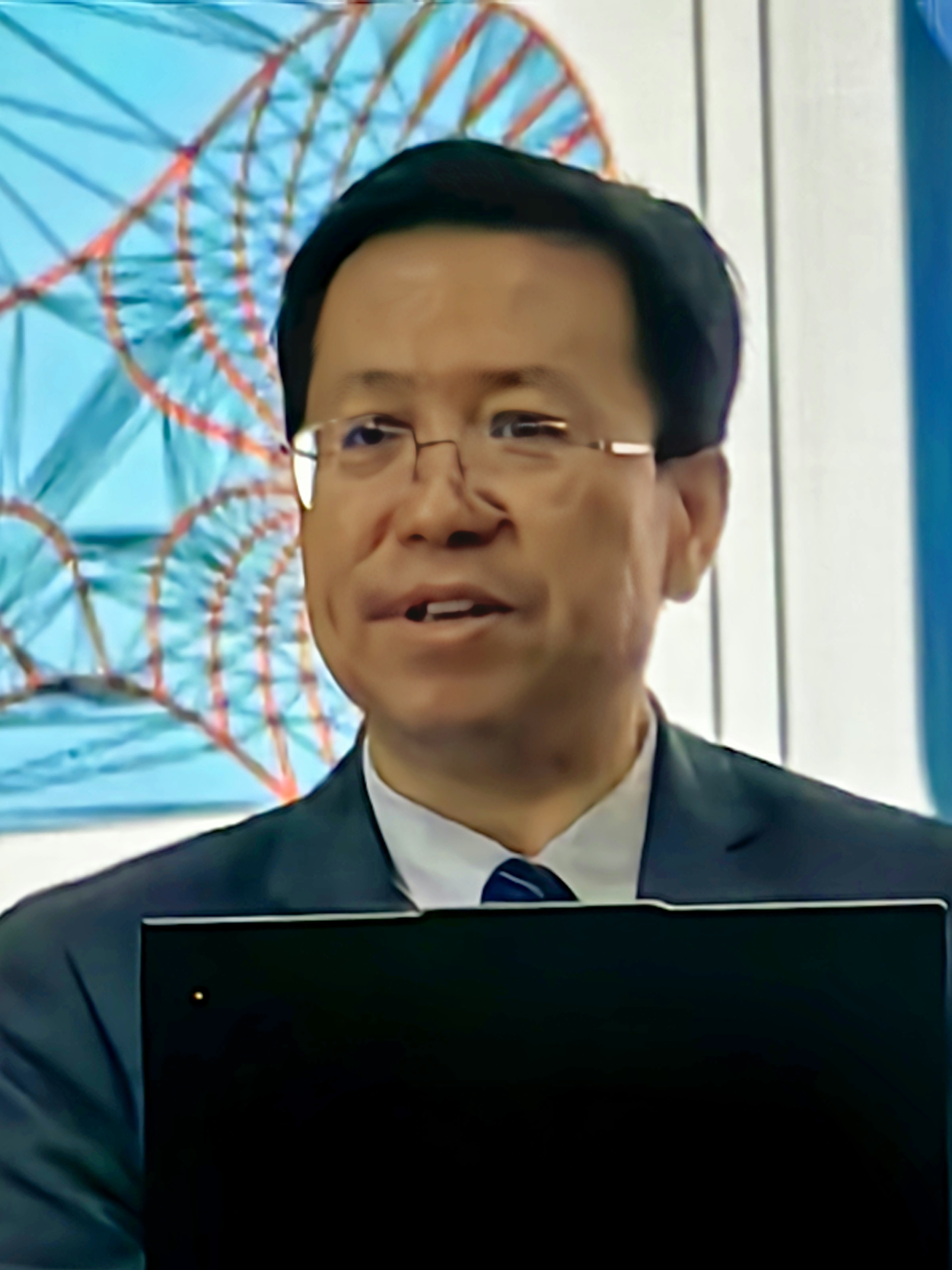
- Tang Lixin (2024)
- Born: August 1966 (age 60); Liaoning, China
- Education: Northeastern University
- Scientific career
- Fields: Artificial intelligence
- Workplaces: Northeastern University

Tang Lixin (Chinese: 唐立新; pinyin: Táng Lìxīn; born August 1966) is a Chinese engineer currently serving as a professor and vice-president of Northeastern University.

== Biography ==
Tang was born in Liaoning in August 1966. He earned a bachelor's degree in industrial automation in 1988, a master's degree in systems engineering in 1991, and a doctor's degree in control theory and application in 1996, all from Northeastern University. After graduating, he taught at the university, where he was promoted to associate professor in 1991 and to full professor in 1999. In November 2015 he was promoted to deputy dean of its School of Information Science and Engineering. In September 2017 he was promoted again to become vice-president of the university.

== Honours and awards ==
- November 22, 2019 Member of the Chinese Academy of Engineering (CAE)
