= Zhao Chunjiang =

Chinese engineer

- 赵春江
- Born: 28 April 1964 (age 62); Baoding, Hebei, China
- Education: Hebei Agricultural University; Beijing Academy of Agricultural and Forestry Sciences; China Agricultural University
- Scientific career
- Fields: Agricultural informatization
- Workplaces: National Engineering Research Center for Information Technology in Agriculture

Chinese name
- Simplified Chinese: 赵春江
- Traditional Chinese: 趙春江
Transcriptions
Standard Mandarin
- Hanyu Pinyin: Zhào Chǖnjiāng

Zhao Chunjiang (born 28 April 1964) is a Chinese engineer who is the director of National Engineering Research Center for Information Technology in Agriculture, and an academician of the Chinese Academy of Engineering.

== Biography ==
Zhao was born in Baoding, Hebei, on 28 April 1964. He attended Hebei Agricultural University where he received his bachelor's degree in crop cultivation and farming in 1985. After completing his master's degree at the Crop Research Institute of Beijing Academy of Agricultural and Forestry Sciences in 1988, he attended China Agricultural University where he obtained his doctor's degree in 1993.

He was associate research fellow at Beijing Academy of Agriculture and Forestry Sciences in 1991 and was promoted to research fellow in 1996. In 1999, he was appointed director of Beijing Agricultural Information Technology Research Center. In 2001, he became director of National Engineering Research Center for Information Technology in Agriculture, concurrently serving as deputy leader of the Expert Steering Group for Whole Process Mechanization of Crop Production, Ministry of Agriculture and Rural Areas since May 2021.

== Honours and awards ==
- 2007 State Science and Technology Progress Award (Second Class)
- 2010 State Science and Technology Progress Award (Second Class)
- 27 November 2017 Member of the Chinese Academy of Engineering (CAE)
- August 2021 Fellow of the Academy of the United Nations Sciences and Technology Organization (AUNSTO)
