= Mao Jingwen =

Chinese engineer

- 毛景文
- Born: 19 December 1956 (age 69); Jinnan Special District, Shanxi, China
- Education: Hebei GEO University
- Scientific career
- Fields: Deposit geology Mineral exploration
- Workplaces: Chinese Academy of Geological Sciences

Mao Jingwen (Chinese: 毛景文; pinyin: Máo Jǐngwén; born 19 December 1956) is a Chinese engineer who is a researcher at the Chinese Academy of Geological Sciences, and an academician of the Chinese Academy of Engineering.

== Biography ==
Mao was born in Jinnan Special District (now Yuncheng), Shanxi, on 19 December 1956. After graduating from Hebei GEO University in 1978, he taught at Shanxi Mining Institute (now Taiyuan University of Technology) for a year, then he went on to receive his master's degree in 1982 and doctor's degreein 1988, all from the Chinese Academy of Geological Sciences.

After graduating, he entered the Institute of Mineral Resources, Chinese Academy of Geological Sciences, where he worked successively as assistant researcher, associate researcher, and researcher.

== Honours and awards ==
- 2008 State Science and Technology Progress Award (Second Class)
- 2012 State Science and Technology Progress Award (Second Class)
- 2016 State Natural Science Award (Second Class)
- 27 November 2017 Member of the Chinese Academy of Engineering (CAE)
