= Shen Wensun =

Chinese shipbuilding engineer

- 沈闻孙
- Born: 6 May 1930; Haiyan County, Zhejiang, China
- Died: 17 November 2025 (aged 95); Dalian, Liaoning, China
- Education: Shanghai Jiao Tong University
- Scientific career
- Workplaces: Dalian Shipbuilding Industry Company (DSIC)

Chinese name
- Simplified Chinese: 沈闻孙
- Traditional Chinese: 沈聞孫
Transcriptions
Standard Mandarin
- Hanyu Pinyin: Shěn Wénsūn

Shen Wensun (Chinese: 沈闻孙; 6 May 1930 – 17 November 2025) was a Chinese shipbuilding engineer, and an academician of the Chinese Academy of Engineering. He made great contributions to China's shipbuilding industry, particularly in the design of large-scale vessels.

== Biography ==
Shen was born on 6 May 1930, in Haiyan County, Zhejiang. In 1953, he graduated from the shipbuilding department of Jiao Tong University (now Shanghai Jiao Tong University).

After graduation, Shen was assigned to Dalian Shipyard and dedicated his life to ship design. He joined the Chinese Communist Party (CCP) in July 1985. From the 1990s, as the chief designer at Dalian Shipbuilding Industry Company, he led the development of several advanced vessel types for the international market.

On 17 November 2025, Shen died at Zhongshan Hospital affiliated with Dalian University, in Dalian, Liaoning, at the age of 95.

== Honours and awards ==
- 1997 Member of the Chinese Academy of Engineering (CAE)
- State Science and Technology Progress Award (First Class, 1990; Second Class, 1995, 1996, 1998)
- 2003 Science and Technology Progress Award of the Ho Leung Ho Lee Foundation
