= Dai Qionghai =

Chinese engineer

- 戴琼海
- Born: 26 December 1964 (age 61); Shanghai, China
- Education: Shaanxi Normal University; Northeastern University
- Scientific career
- Fields: Automatic control
- Workplaces: Tsinghua University

Dai Qionghai (Chinese: 戴琼海; pinyin: Dài Qiónghǎi; born 26 December 1964) is a Chinese engineer who is a professor at Tsinghua University, and an academician of the Chinese Academy of Engineering (CAE).

== Biography ==
Dai was born in Shanghai, on 26 December 1964. In 1983, he was admitted to Shaanxi Normal University, majoring in mathematics. After graduating in 1987, he became an engineer at Yuejin Steel Works in northwest China's Xinjiang Uygur Autonomous Region. He received his Master of Engineering degree and Doctor of Engineering degree from Northeastern University in 1994 and 1996, respectively.

He joined the faculty of Department of Automation, Tsinghua University in 1999 and was promoted to professor in 2005. He was honored as a Distinguished Young Scholar by the National Science Fund for Distinguished Young Scholars (Chinese: 国家杰出青年科学基金) in 2005. In 2009, he was appointed as a "Chang Jiang Scholar" (or " Yangtze River Scholar") by the Ministry of Education of the People's Republic of China. In July 2020, he was engaged by the State Council as a counsellor.

== Honours and awards ==
- 2008 State Technological Invention Award (Second Class)
- 2012 State Technological Invention Award (First Class)
- 2016 State Science and Technology Progress Award (Second Class)
- 27 November 2017 Member of the Chinese Academy of Engineering (CAE)
