= Sun Chuanyao =

Chinese engineer (1944–2025)

- 孙传尧
- Born: 13 December 1944; Raohe County, East Manzong Province, Manchukuo
- Died: 21 August 2025 (aged 80); Beijing, China
- Education: Northeastern University
- Scientific career
- Fields: Mineral processing
- Workplaces: Beijing General Research Institute of Mining and Metallurgy

Chinese name
- Simplified Chinese: 孙传尧
- Traditional Chinese: 孫傳堯
Transcriptions
Standard Mandarin
- Hanyu Pinyin: Sūn Chuányáo

Sun Chuanyao (Chinese: 孙传尧; 13 December 1944 – 21 August 2025) was a Chinese engineer specializing in mineral processing, and an academician of the Chinese Academy of Engineering.

== Biography ==
Sun was born in Raohe County, East Manzong Province, Manchukuo (now Heilongjiang, China), on 13 December 1944, while his ancestral home is in Dongping County, Shandong. In 1963, he enrolled at Northeast Institute of Technology (now Northeastern University), where he majored in mineral processing.

After university in December 1968, Sun was assigned to the Mineral Processing Plant of Keketuohai Mining Bureau in Xinjiang, where he was promoted to deputy director in October 1976. He joined the Chinese Communist Party (CCP) in January 1978. In October 1978, he did his postgraduate work at Beijing General Research Institute of Mining and Metallurgy, and stayed to work after graduation. He moved up the ranks to become vice president in October 1985 and president in February 1988.

On 21 August 2025, Sun died in Beijing, at the age of 80.

== Honours and awards ==
- 1989 State Science and Technology Progress Award (Second Class) for the new asynchronous flotation process for high-grade lead-zinc mixed concentrate
- December 1991 Academician of Saint Petersburg Academic University
- 1996 State Science and Technology Progress Award (Second Class) for the research and industrial application of electrochemical control flotation comprehensive technology
- 2001 State Science and Technology Progress Award (Second Class) for the new comprehensive beneficiation technology for tungsten molybdenum bismuth complex polymetallic ore - Shizhuyuan method
- November 2003 Member of the Chinese Academy of Engineering (CAE)
- 2006 Engineering Award of the 6th Guanghua Engineering Science and Technology Award
- 2014 State Science and Technology Progress Award (Second Class) for the key technologies and industrial applications for efficient separation of complex and difficult to process tungsten ores
