= Xia Changliang =

Chinese engineer and administrator

- 夏长亮

President of Tiangong University
- Incumbent
- Assumed office October 2018
- Preceded by: Yang Qingxin

Personal details
- Born: 1 April 1968 (age 58) Tianjin, China
- Party: Chinese Communist Party
- Education: Tianjin University; Zhejiang University
- Scientific career
- Fields: Motor design and control
- Institutions: Tiangong University

Chinese name
- Simplified Chinese: 夏长亮
- Traditional Chinese: 夏長亮
Transcriptions
Standard Mandarin
- Hanyu Pinyin: Xià Chángliàng

Xia Changliang (born 1 April 1968) is a Chinese engineer and administrator currently serving as president of Tiangong University. He is an academician of the Chinese Academy of Engineering (CAE).

== Biography ==
Xia was born in Tianjin, on 1 April 1968. He earned a B.S. degree from Tianjin University in 1990 and an M.S. and a Ph.D. degree from Zhejiang University in 1993 and 1995, respectively. After graduating in 1996, he stayed at the university, becoming a professor at the School of Electrical and Automation Engineering in 2002. In April 2010, he became vice president of Tiangong University, rising to president in October 2018. On 24 January 2018, he became a member of the 13th National Committee of the Chinese People's Political Consultative Conference.

== Honors and awards ==
- 2011 State Science and Technology Progress Award (Second Class)
- 2012 Guanghua Engineering Science and Technology Award (Youth Award)
- 2013 State Technological Invention Award (Second Class)
- 27 November 2017 Member of the Chinese Academy of Engineering (CAE)

Educational offices
Preceded by Yang Qingxin	President of Tiangong University; 2018–present	Incumbent
