= Yao Bin (agronomist) =

Chinese agronomist

- 姚斌
- Born: October 1967 (age 58); Fuzhou, Jiangxi, China
- Education: Huazhong Agricultural University; China Agricultural University; Chinese Academy of Agricultural Sciences
- Scientific career
- Fields: Feed biotechnology
- Workplaces: Chinese Academy of Agricultural Sciences

Yao Bin (Chinese: 姚斌; pinyin: Yáo Bīn; born October 1967) is a Chinese agronomist who is a researcher and vice-president of Chinese Academy of Agricultural Sciences.

== Biography ==
Yao was born in Fuzhou, Jiangxi, in October 1967. He secondary studied at Fuzhou No.3 High School (now Linchuan No.3 High School). He attended Huazhong Agricultural University where he received his bachelor's degree in microbiology in 1988. After completing his master's degree in phytopathology at China Agricultural University, he attended Chinese Academy of Agricultural Sciences where he obtained his doctor's degree in molecular biology in 1994. After graduation, he was offered a faculty position at the academy.

== Honours and awards ==
- November 22, 2019 Member of the Chinese Academy of Engineering (CAE)
