= Sun Lili =

Chinese engineer

- Born: November 1961 (age 64); Yantai, Shandong, China
- Education: China University of Petroleum
- Scientific career
- Fields: Oil
- Workplaces: Sinopec Engineering Incorporation

Chinese name
- Traditional Chinese: 孫麗麗
- Simplified Chinese: 孙丽丽
Transcriptions
Standard Mandarin
- Hanyu Pinyin: Sūn Lìlì

Sun Lili (Chinese: 孙丽丽; born November 1961) is a Chinese engineer and the current party chief and general manager of Sinopec Engineering Incorporation.

== Biography ==
Sun was born in Yantai, Shandong, in November 1961. She attended Muping No. 1 High School. After the resumption of National College Entrance Examination, she was accepted to China University of Petroleum. After university, she joined the Sinopec.

== Honours and awards ==
- October 21, 2016 Science and Technology Progress Award of the Ho Leung Ho Lee Foundation
- December 15, 2018 member of the Chemical Industry and Engineering Society of China
- November 22, 2019 Member of the Chinese Academy of Engineering (CAE)
