= Liu Liang =

Chinese physician

- 刘良

President of Macau University of Science and Technology
- Incumbent
- Assumed office January 2013
- Preceded by: Xu Ao'ao

Personal details
- Born: July 1957 (age 69) Hanshou County, Hunan, China
- Party: Chinese Communist Party
- Education: Guangzhou University of Chinese Medicine
- Scientific career
- Fields: Traditional Chinese medical science
- Workplaces: Macau University of Science and Technology

Chinese name
- Traditional Chinese: 劉良
- Simplified Chinese: 刘良
Transcriptions
Standard Mandarin
- Hanyu Pinyin: Liǘ Liáng

Liu Liang (Chinese: 刘良; born July 1957) is a Chinese physician and currently president of Macau University of Science and Technology. Liu is a world leading scholar in rheumatology and immunology.

== Biography ==
Liu was born in Hanshou County, Hunan, in July 1957. From 1975 to 1977 he studied at Changde Health School. He earned a bachelor's degree in 1982, a master's degree in 1985, and a doctor's degree in 1990, all from Guangzhou University of Chinese Medicine. After graduating, he taught at the university, where he was promoted to vice-president in 1997. He was a visiting scholar at Hannover Medical School and University of Erlangen–Nuremberg between 1992 and 1994. In 2000 he became dean of School of Chinese Medicine, Hong Kong Baptist University, a position he held until June 2011. In July 2011 he became the deputy president of Macau University of Science and Technology, rising to president in January 2013. He has been director of the State Key Laboratory of Quality Research in Chinese Medicines since January 2013.

== Honours and awards ==
- January 9, 2019 Honorific Certificate of Merit
- November 22, 2019 Member of the Chinese Academy of Engineering (CAE)
- December 2019 Fellow of the National Academy of Inventors (NAI)

Educational offices
Preceded by Xu Ao'ao (许敖敖)	President of Macau University of Science and Technology; 2013	Incumbent
