= Wu Yiling =

Chinese billionaire

Wu Yiling (born 1949) is a Chinese billionaire whose fortunes derive from his stake in Yiling Pharmaceutical, founded by his father in 1992. He graduated from Hebei Medical University and Nanjing University of Chinese Medicine, and resides in Shijiazhuang.
