= Gong Shengkai =

Chinese materials scientist (born 1956)

- Born: July 1956 (age 70); China
- Education: Northeastern University (China); Tokyo Institute of Technology
- Scientific career
- Fields: Materials science
- Workplaces: Beihang University

Chinese name
- Traditional Chinese: 宮聲凱
- Simplified Chinese: 宫声凯
Transcriptions
Standard Mandarin
- Hanyu Pinyin: Gōng Shēngkǎi

Gong Shengkai (Chinese: 宫声凯; born July 1956) is a Chinese materials scientist who is a professor at the School of Materials Science and Engineering, Beihang University.

== Biography ==
Gong was born in July 1956. After graduating from Northeast Institute of Technology (now Northeastern University (China)), he earned his doctor's degree from Tokyo Institute of Technology in 1988. He carried out postdoctoral research at Tsinghua University in 1988. In 1994 he was offered a faculty position in the School of Materials Science and Engineering, Beihang University.

== Honours and awards ==
- 2016 State Technological Invention Award (First Class)
- November 22, 2019 Member of the Chinese Academy of Engineering (CAE)
