= Ma Yuanliang =

Chinese engineer

- 马远良
- Born: 15 July 1938; Longchang County, Sichuan, China
- Died: 11 July 2025 (aged 86); Xi'an, Shaanxi, China
- Education: Northwestern Polytechnical University; National University of Defense Technology
- Scientific career
- Fields: Sonar
- Workplaces: Northwestern Polytechnical University

Chinese name
- Simplified Chinese: 马远良
- Traditional Chinese: 馬遠良
Transcriptions
Standard Mandarin
- Hanyu Pinyin: Mǎ Yuǎnliáng

Ma Yuanliang (Chinese: 马远良; 15 July 1938 – 11 July 2025) was a Chinese engineer who was a professor at Northwestern Polytechnical University, and an academician of the Chinese Academy of Engineering.

== Biography ==
Ma was born into a family of doctors in Longchang County (now Longchang), Sichuan, on 15 July 1938. In 1956, he enrolled at Northwestern Polytechnical University, where he majored in the Underwater Weapon Department. In 1958, he transferred to the PLA Military Academy of Engineering (now National University of Defense Technology), where he majored in the Naval Engineering Department. He joined the Chinese Communist Party (CCP) on 12 March 1960.

After graduation in January 1961, Ma returned to Northwestern Polytechnical University and taught there. From May 1981 to May 1983, he pursued further studies in the Department of Electronic Engineering at the University of Loughborough in the United Kingdom as a visiting scholar. He was director of the Institute of Underwater Weapons in July 1985, director of the Institute of Acoustic Engineering in April 1988, and dean of the School of Naval Engineering in March 1991.

On 11 July 2025, Ma died in Xi'an, Shaanxi, at the age of 86.

== Honours and awards ==
- 1998 State Technological Invention Award (Third Class) for the development of high speed and large capacity bidirectional hybrid multi channel transmission system
- 2000 State Science and Technology Progress Award (Second Class) for the X/XX-144 type airborne sonar
- 2003 Member of the Chinese Academy of Engineering (CAE)
- 2024 State Technological Invention Award (Second Class) for the key technologies and applications of underwater low frequency detection
