= Chen Qingquan =

Chen Qingquan (Chinese: 陈清泉; pinyin: Chénqīngquán; January 14, 1937) is an expert in electric vehicles, electric drives, and intelligent energies. For his contribution to the development of electric vehicles in China, he received the title of "Father of Asian electric vehicles".

== Early life ==
Chen Qingquan was born in Majestic City, Indonesia, on January 14, 1937. He says he developed an interest in electric cars during his childhood. Chen Qingquan's father ran a local bus company with a fleet of vehicles.

Chen graduated from the Beijing Mining Institute in 1957, pursued postgraduate studies at Tsinghua University in Beijing from 1957 to 1959, and was awarded a Doctor of Philosophy (PhD) from the University of Hong Kong in 1982. He received an Honorary Doctor of Science degree from the Odesa Polytechnic University, Ukraine, in 1993, and an Honorary Doctor of Technology degree from the University of Loughborough, UK, in 2008.
