= Zhang Yingze =

Chinese orthopedist

- 张英泽
- Born: 15 June 1953 (age 73); Hengshui Special District, Hebei, China
- Education: Hebei Medical University; Shinshu University
- Scientific career
- Fields: Orthopaedics
- Workplaces: Hebei Medical University

Chinese name
- Simplified Chinese: 张英泽
- Traditional Chinese: 張英澤
Transcriptions
Standard Mandarin
- Hanyu Pinyin: Zhāng Yīngzé

Zhang Yingze (born 15 June 1953) is a Chinese orthopedist who is director of Hebei Institute of Orthopedics, a former vice president of Hebei Medical University and president of its Third Affiliated Hospital, and an academician of the Chinese Academy of Engineering.

== Biography ==
Zhang was born in Hengshui Special District, Hebei, on 15 June 1953. In 1975, he graduated from Hebei Medical College (now Hebei Medical University).

After graduation, he stayed at the university and worked at its Third Affiliated Hospital, where he became vice president in December 1993 and president in March 1999. In 1991, he arrived in Japan to begin his education at Shinshu University. In February 2006, he was promoted to become vice president of Hebei Medical University.

He is now director of Hebei Institute of Orthopedics.

== Honours and awards ==
- 2011 State Science and Technology Progress Award (Second Class)
- 2013 State Science and Technology Progress Award (Second Class)
- 2016 State Technological Invention Award (Second Class)
- 27 November 2017 Member of the Chinese Academy of Engineering (CAE)
