= Deng Jianjun =

Chinese engineer

- 邓建军
- Born: 8 April 1964 (age 62); Ji'an Special District, Jiangxi, China
- Education: Beijing Institute of Technology; Tsinghua University
- Scientific career
- Fields: Pulse accelerator
- Workplaces: China Academy of Engineering Physics

Chinese name
- Simplified Chinese: 邓建军
- Traditional Chinese: 鄧建軍
Transcriptions
Standard Mandarin
- Hanyu Pinyin: Dèng Jiànjūn

Deng Jianjun (born 8 April 1964) is a Chinese engineer who is a researcher at the China Academy of Engineering Physics, and an academician of the Chinese Academy of Engineering.

== Biography ==
Deng was born in Ji'an Special District, Jiangxi, on 8 April 1964. He attended Beijing Institute of Technology where he received his bachelor's degree in 1985. After completing his master's degree from the Graduate School of China Academy of Engineering Physics in 1988, he attended Tsinghua University where he obtained his doctor's degree in 2003. After university, he was engaged as a researcher at the China Academy of Engineering Physics.

== Honours and awards ==
- 1997 State Science and Technology Progress Award (First Class)
- 2005 State Science and Technology Progress Award (First Class)
- 2017 State Science and Technology Progress Award (First Class)
- 27 November 2017 Member of the Chinese Academy of Engineering (CAE)
