= Xu Zuxin =

Chinese environmentalist

- 徐祖信
- Born: April 1956 (age 70); Pingxiang, Jiangxi, China
- Education: Hohai University
- Scientific career
- Fields: Environmental protection
- Workplaces: Tongji University

Xu Zuxin (Chinese: 徐祖信; pinyin: Xú Zǔxìn; born April 1956) is a Chinese female environmentalist who is a professor and doctoral supervisor at the College of Environmental Science and Engineering, Tongji University.

== Biography ==
Xu was born in Pingxiang, Jiangxi, in April 1956. She earned her bachelor's degree, master's degree and doctor's degree all from Hohai University between 1977 and 1988.She taught at the university since 1988, what she was promoted to associate professor in 1991 and to full professor in 1996. She was a visiting scholar at Sapienza University of Rome between 1993 and 1995. She was a postdoctoral fellow at Tongji University from 1995 to 1997. In 1997, she joined the faculty of Tongji University. In April 2000 she became the deputy director of Shanghai Environmental Protection Bureau, rising to director in April 2003. In September 2007 she was appointed deputy director of Shanghai Municipal Commission of Science and Technology.

== Honours and awards ==
- November 22, 2019 Member of the Chinese Academy of Engineering (CAE)
