= Li Qingzhong =

Chinese scientist (1930–2022)

- 李庆忠
- Born: 10 October 1930; Kunshan County, Jiangsu, China
- Died: 26 December 2022 (aged 92); China
- Education: Tsinghua University
- Scientific career
- Fields: Oil exploration
- Workplaces: Geophysical Exploration Bureau of China National Petroleum Corporation (CNPC)

Li Qingzhong (Chinese: 李庆忠; pinyin: Lǐ Qìngzhōng; 10 October 1930 – 26 December 2022) was a Chinese petroleum geophysical exploration engineer, and an academician of the Chinese Academy of Engineering.

== Biography ==
Li was born in Kunshan County (now Kunshan), Jiangsu, on 10 October 1930. Both His grandfather Li Peiqing (李培卿) and father Li Junmei (李君梅) were traditional Chinese medicine doctors. He had nine siblings. In November 1937, to avoid the war, his family moved into the French Concession in Shanghai, where he attended the Middle School Affiliated to Aurora University and Gezhi High School (格致中学). In 1949, he was admitted to Tsinghua University. He studied in the Department of Electrical Engineering at the beginning, but switched to the Department of Physics later.

After graduating in 1952, Li became an intern of the State Administration of Petroleum of the Ministry of Fuel (Beijing). He became an engineer and leader of the Comprehensive Research Team in the Geological Survey Department of Xinjiang Zhongsu Petroleum Company (later Xinjiang Petroleum Administration Bureau) in March 1953. In May 1961, he was transferred to northeast China's Heilongjiang and appointed deputy leader of the Comprehensive Research Team of the Geological Survey Headquarters of Songliao Petroleum Exploration Headquarters. He was deputy head of Research Team of Geophysical Prospecting Bureau of 646 Plant, Ministry of Petroleum Industry in October 1963 and subsequently deputy chief Engineer of Shengli Oilfield (Shandong) and deputy commander of Geological Command Post in March 1964. In May 1979, he joined the China National Petroleum Corporation (CNPC), serving as deputy chief engineer of Petroleum Geophysical Exploration Bureau (Zhuozhou, Hebei). From September 1979 to September 1980, he served as a technical representative of the Chinese side at the Houston Data Processing Center (EDPC) of Exxon Oil Company in the United States. Between July 1988 and January 1989, he worked as a guest researcher at the Western Geophysical Company in Houston, the United States.

Li died on 26 December 2022, at the age of 92.

== Honours and awards ==
- 1995 Member of the Chinese Academy of Engineering (CAE)
