= Kang Zhensheng =

- 康振生
- Born: 13 October 1957 (age 68); Anyue County, Sichuan, China
- Education: Northwest A&F University
- Scientific career
- Fields: Phytopathology
- Workplaces: College of Plant Protection, Northwest A&F University
- Academic advisors: Li Zhenqi

Kang Zhensheng (Chinese: 康振生; pinyin: Kāng Zhènshēng; born 13 October 1957) is a Chinese phytopathologist who is a professor at the College of Plant Protection, Northwest A&F University and director of State Key Laboratory of Crop Stress Biology for Arid Areas, and an academician of the Chinese Academy of Engineering.

== Biography ==
Kang was born in Anyue County, Sichuan, on 13 October 1957. In 1975, in the late Cultural Revolution, he became a sent-down youth in Shiquan County, Shaanxi. After resuming the college entrance examination, he studied, then taught, at what is now Northwest A&F University.

He joined the Communist Party in October 1984. He was promoted to associate professor in April 1991 and to full professor in December 1994. He was honored as a Distinguished Young Scholar by the National Science Fund for Distinguished Young Scholars in 2001. In May 2004, he became dean of the College of Plant Protection, Northwest A & F University, a post he kept until December 2006. He was appointed as a "Chang Jiang Scholar" (or " Yangtze River Scholar") by the Ministry of Education of the People's Republic of China in 2005.

== Honours and awards ==
- 1999 State Science and Technology Progress Award (Third Class)
- 2010 State Science and Technology Progress Award (Second Class)
- 2012 State Science and Technology Progress Award (First Class)
- 27 November 2017 Member of the Chinese Academy of Engineering (CAE)
