= Huang Qingxue =

Chinese engineer and administrator

- 黄庆学

President of Taiyuan University of Technology
- Incumbent
- Assumed office December 2015
- Preceded by: Lü Ming

Personal details
- Born: 5 December 1960 (age 65) Shulan, Jilin, China
- Party: Chinese Communist Party
- Education: Yanshan University
- Scientific career
- Fields: Design of Rolling Mills
- Workplaces: Taiyuan University of Technology

Chinese name
- Simplified Chinese: 黄庆学
- Traditional Chinese: 黃慶學
Transcriptions
Standard Mandarin
- Hanyu Pinyin: Huáng Qìngxué

Huang Qingxue (Chinese: 黄庆学; born 5 December 1960) is a Chinese engineer and administrator who is the president of Taiyuan University of Technology since 2015.

== Biography ==
Huang was born in Shulan, Jilin, on 5 December 1960. He earned a bachelor's degree in 1984, a master's degree in 1989, and a doctor's degree in 1993, all from Yanshan University.

After university, he joined the faculty of Taiyuan University of Technology, becoming vice president in February 2010 and president in December 2015. He concurrently served as dean of Metal Composite Forming Technology and Equipment Research Institute since August 2019.

He served as a delegate to the 13th National People's Congress.

== Honours and awards ==
- 2011 Science and Technology Progress Award of the Ho Leung Ho Lee Foundation
- November 27, 2017 Member of the Chinese Academy of Engineering (CAE)

Educational offices
Preceded by Lü Ming	President of Taiyuan University of Technology; 2015–present	Incumbent
