= Zhu Guangsheng =

Chinese engineer

- Born: January 1963 (age 63); China
- Education: National University of Defense Technology
- Scientific career
- Fields: Rocket
- Workplaces: China Academy of Launch Vehicle Technology; China Aerospace Science and Technology Corporation

Chinese name
- Traditional Chinese: 朱廣生
- Simplified Chinese: 朱广生
Transcriptions
Standard Mandarin
- Hanyu Pinyin: Zhū Guǎngshēng

Zhu Guangsheng (Chinese: 朱广生; born January 1963) is a Chinese engineer currently working as a researcher at China Aerospace Science and Technology Corporation and architect at China Academy of Launch Vehicle Technology.

== Biography ==
Zhu was born in January 1963. After graduating from National University of Defense Technology in 1989, he was assigned to the 14th Institute of the 1st Academy of China Aerospace Science and Technology Corporation

== Honours and awards ==
- November 22, 2019 Member of the Chinese Academy of Engineering (CAE)
