= Jiang Jianchun =

Chinese forestry engineer

- 蒋剑春
- Born: 9 February 1955 (age 71); Liyang County, Jiangsu, China
- Education: East China University of Science and Technology
- Scientific career
- Fields: Biomaterial
- Workplaces: Institute of Forest Chemical Industry, Chinese Academy of Forestry Sciences

Chinese name
- Simplified Chinese: 蒋剑春
- Traditional Chinese: 蔣劍春
Transcriptions
Standard Mandarin
- Hanyu Pinyin: Jiǎng Jiànchūn

Jiang Jianchun (born 9 February 1955) is a Chinese forestry engineer who is a researcher at the Institute of Forest Chemical Industry, Chinese Academy of Forestry Sciences, and an academician of the Chinese Academy of Engineering.

== Biography ==
Jiang was born in Liyang County, Jiangsu, on 9 February 1955. After graduating from East China University of Science and Technology in January 1980, he was despatched to the Chinese Academy of Forestry Sciences.

He is now a researcher and doctoral supervisor at the Institute of Forest Chemical Industry.

== Honours and awards ==
- 2013 State Science and Technology Progress Award (Second Class)
- 2016 State Science and Technology Progress Award (Second Class)
- 27 November 2017 Member of the Chinese Academy of Engineering (CAE)
