= Zheng Yuguo =

Chinese engineer

- 郑裕国
- Born: 5 November 1961 (age 64); Xiangshan County, Zhejiang, China
- Education: Zhejiang University of Technology
- Children: 3
- Scientific career
- Workplaces: Zhejiang University of Technology

Chinese name
- Simplified Chinese: 郑裕国
- Traditional Chinese: 鄭裕國
Transcriptions
Standard Mandarin
- Hanyu Pinyin: Zhèng Yùguó

Zheng Yuguo (born 5 November 1961) is a Chinese engineer who is a professor at Zhejiang University of Technology, and an academician of the Chinese Academy of Engineering.

== Biography ==
Zheng was born in Xiangshan County, Zhejiang, on 5 November 1961. After resuming the college entrance examination, in 1979, he enrolled at Zhejiang Engineering College (now Zhejiang University of Technology), where he majored in the Department of Chemical Machinery.

After graduating in 1983, he stayed at the university and worked successively as an instructor (1983–1995), associate professor (1995–2000), full professor (2000–present), deputy dean of the School of Biological and Environmental Engineering (2006–2010), and dean of Biological and Environmental Engineering (2010–2020).

In March 2018, he became a member of the 13th National Committee of the Chinese People's Political Consultative Conference.

== Honours and awards ==
- 2008 State Technological Invention Award (Second Class)
- 2010 State Technological Invention Award (Second Class)
- 2014 State Science and Technology Progress Award (Second Class)
- 27 November 2017 Member of the Chinese Academy of Engineering (CAE)
- November 2019 Science and Technology Progress Award of the Ho Leung Ho Lee Foundation
