= Ren Fazheng =

Chinese engineer

- Born: August 1962 (age 64); Yingkou, Liaoning, China
- Education: China Agricultural University
- Scientific career
- Fields: Food science Nutrition Engineering
- Workplaces: China Agricultural University

Chinese name
- Traditional Chinese: 任發政
- Simplified Chinese: 任发政
Transcriptions
Standard Mandarin
- Hanyu Pinyin: Rén Fāzhèng

Ren Fazheng (Chinese: 任发政; born August 1962) is a Chinese engineer who is a professor and doctoral supervisor at China Agricultural University.

== Biography ==
Ren was born in Yingkou, Liaoning, in August 1962. In September 1980 he entered China Agricultural University, where he graduated in July 1987. After graduation, he taught at the university.

== Honours and awards ==
- November 18, 2019 Industrial Innovation Award of the Ho Leung Ho Lee Foundation
- November 22, 2019 Member of the Chinese Academy of Engineering (CAE)
