= Xu Qing (engineer) =

Chinese engineer

- 徐青
- Born: October 1960 (age 65); Wuhan, Hubei, China
- Education: Shanghai Jiao Tong University
- Scientific career
- Fields: Ship design
- Workplaces: China State Shipbuilding Corporation

Xu Qing (Chinese: 徐青; pinyin: Xú Qīng; born October 1960) is a Chinese engineer currently serving as a chief technologist at China State Shipbuilding Corporation.

== Biography ==
Xu was born in Wuhan, Hubei, in October 1960. After graduating from Shanghai Jiao Tong University in 1982, he was assigned to the 701 Institute of China State Shipbuilding Corporation.

== Honours and awards ==
- 2015 State Science and Technology Progress Award (First Class)
- 2015 Science and Technology Progress Award of the Ho Leung Ho Lee Foundation
- November 22, 2019 Member of the Chinese Academy of Engineering (CAE)
