= Ren Qilong =

Chinese engineer

- Born: January 1959 (age 67); Dongyang, Zhejiang, China
- Education: Zhejiang University
- Scientific career
- Fields: Separation Engineering; Pharmaceutical Engineering; Natural Pharmaceutical Chemistry; Supercritical Fluid Technology
- Workplaces: Zhejiang University
- Doctoral advisor: Wu Ping

Chinese name
- Traditional Chinese: 任其龍
- Simplified Chinese: 任其龙
Transcriptions
Standard Mandarin
- Hanyu Pinyin: Rén Qílóng

Ren Qilong (Chinese: 任其龙; born January 1959) is a Chinese engineer currently serving as dean of College of Chemical and Biological Engineering, Zhejiang University.

== Biography ==
Ren was born in Baiyun Subdistrict of Dongyang, Zhejiang, in January 1959. He secondary studied at Dongyang No.2 High School. He earned a bachelor's degree in 1982, a master's degree in 1987, and a doctor's degree in 1998, all from Zhejiang University. His supervisor was Prof.Wu Ping (吴平). During his university years, he was the champion of long-distance running in the school sports meetings. After graduation, he taught at the university. He was a researcher at Osaka University from October 1992 to October 1993.

== Honours and awards ==
- 2018 State Technological Invention Award (Second Class)
- November 22, 2019 Member of the Chinese Academy of Engineering (CAE)
