= The Shenzhen Experiment =

2020 book by Juan Du

- First edition
- Author: Juan Du
- Language: English
- Subject: Shenzhen
- Genre: Nonfiction
- Publisher: Harvard University Press
- Publication date: 2020
- Publication place: United States

The Shenzhen Experiment: The Story of China's Instant City is a 2020 non-fiction book by Juan Du, published by Harvard University Press.

Du argued that there was a misconception that Shenzhen was built almost entirely by the central government when officials from Guangdong province had first advocated for the idea of making Shenzhen a "special economic zone". Additionally, the book addresses a misconception that the entirety of what is now Shenzhen was only occupied by fishing villages prior to 1979. Furthermore, Du explained that the SEZ was meant not to make China extremely wealthy but to take China out of a lower income category.

Du advocated for more historical preservation in future urban planning in China.

According to Denise Y. Ho (Note: Denise Y. Ho: traditional Chinese: 何若書; simplified Chinese: 何若书; Jyutping: ho4 joek6 syu1; pinyin: Hé Ruòshū) of Yale University, it was the first specialist work about the city that is an entire book.

== Background ==
Du teaches at the University of Hong Kong and also is an architect. She had done research and conducted interviews, with work done in multiple villages in Shenzhen. Du found inspiration exploring Shenzhen after she failed to get on board a flight. Prior to that period, Du had never had a period where she was in a stay in Shenzhen which went past an evening into a morning.

== Contents ==
The book has eight chapters, organized into four sections. Chapters are named after landmarks and cultural aspects, which Du describes as "artifacts".

The first section is "National Relevance" (how it relates to China as a whole), with the first chapter chronicling Jiang Kairu. The others are: "Regional History" (the development of the Pearl River Delta), "Urban Construction" (which includes conflict between the pro-development government and individuals who wish to retain their housing, or "nail houses"), and the section about "urban villages".

The book has an in-depth discussion of how land is acquired and developed, including how the law and politics intersect with that arena. Jeffrey N. Wasserstrom, in The Wall Street Journal, wrote that the book is "a compilation of stories" that make the work "colorful and engaging", and not only "a collection of analytic claims". Wasserstrom stated that Du "downplays" the 1989 Tiananmen Square protests and massacre. The work argues that Shenzhen should not be used as a model of urban planning neither in China nor outside of China; Susanne Stein of Technical University of Berlin's Center for Cultural Studies on Science and Technology in China states that the book's arguments against doing so are "compelling".

The book includes multiple maps, including topographic maps, and photographs. Taomo Zhou (Note: Taomo Zhou: Chinese: 周陶沫; pinyin: Zhōu Táomò) of Nanyang Technological University stated that these details are due to Du's architectural background and praised the maps and photographs as being "impressive".

== Reception ==
George Baily, in Asian Affairs, stated that "This is a remarkable book on a remarkable subject." He added that "The reader comes away from this book in even more awe of Shenzhen" as it documents not only "the expected stream of statistical superlatives" but also the "aspirations and energies of the individuals who built Shenzhen is the author's major and subtly subversive success here."

Adrian Blackwell stated that the book is "an exemplary work".

Joel Campbell of Troy University argued that the book was supposed to be about how Shenzhen developed post-1979 but that it should have focused more on that era and on the area political figures and less on the pre-1979 period.

Ho called it "Engagingly written and artfully crafted", and the book "shines" in portions where Du uses her knowledge of architecture. Ho stated that she wished that the book examined other scholarly works on the subject.

Gary W. McDonogh of Bryn Mawr College wrote that compared to Learning from Shenzhen, The Shenzhen Experiment was not "provocative" but more "complete".

Stein stated that the work was "equally instructive and highly readable".

Wasserstrom praised how the work is "a major contribution to understanding a fascinating city" though he argued she should not have de-emphasized the massacre, should have cited Shenzheners by Xue Yiwei, and should have examined how the "“fishing village" myth" became popularized.

Zhou stated that the book "is an inspiring addition to the study of Shenzhen in the English-language world".

China City Planning Review argued that the book may be used as "reference material for the exploration and practice of multi-plan integration."

== Citation ==
- Du, Juan (2020-01-07). The Shenzhen Experiment: The Story of China's Instant City. Harvard University Press. doi:10.2307/j.ctv2d8qwz7. ISBN 978-0-674-24222-7. JSTOR j.ctv2d8qwz7.
