= Tang Li =

Tang Li may refer to:

- Tang Li (Go player)
- Tang Li (engineer)
