= Beijing 1 =

Chinese light airliner prototype

General information
- Type: Light airliner
- National origin: People's Republic of China
- Manufacturer: Beijing Aviation Institute
- Number built: 1

History
- First flight: 24 September 1958

The Beijing 1 (also known as the Beijing No 1 or Peking No 1) was a prototype twin-engined small airliner of the 1950s designed and built in the People's Republic of China. Only one example was built, due to the type not entering production.

== Design and development ==
In 1958, the Beijing Aviation Institute (later to become known as the Beijing University of Aeronautics and Astronautics (BUAA) and now Beihang University) was instructed by Chinese Premier Zhou Enlai to design an airliner. The resulting design, the Beijing 1, was a small twin-engined low-wing cantilever monoplane with a retractable tricycle landing gear and of all metal construction. It was powered by two 190-kilowatt (250 hp) Ivchenko AI-14 driving two-bladed wooden propellers, while its wings were fitted with leading-edge slats and trailing edge flaps to ease operations out of small airfields. A crew of two and 8 to 10 passengers were carried in the aircraft's fuselage.

The Beijing 1 made its maiden flight on 24 September 1958, and was handed over to the Chinese civil aviation authorities on 1 October 1958, the 9th anniversary of the establishment of the People's Republic of China. It was the first passenger airliner designed and built in the People's Republic. (Note: The Manshū Aircraft Company, based in Japanese occupied Manchuria, and managed and controlled by the Japanese, had built about 35 Fokker Super Universals under licence between 1934 and 1936, followed by 35 Manshū Hayabusa transports from December 1936.)

Although contemporary reports suggested that the type entered service with Civil Aviation Administration of China, no production followed, with only the single prototype being built. It is now preserved at the Beijing Aviation Museum.

== Specifications ==
Data from Chinese Aircraft: China's Aviation Industry since 1951

General characteristics

- Crew: 2
- Capacity: 8–10 passengers
- Length: 12.15 m (39 ft 10 in)
- Wingspan: 16.40 m (53 ft 10 in)
- Height: 4.39 m (14 ft 5 in)
- Gross weight: 3,000 kg (6,614 lb)
- Powerplant: 2 × Ivchenko AI-14 nine-cylinder air-cooled radial engines, 190 kW (260 hp) each

Performance

- Maximum speed: 300 km/h (190 mph, 160 kn)
- Range: 1,075 km (668 mi, 580 nmi)
- Service ceiling: 4,800 m (15,700 ft)
