= Dynaudio =

Danish loudspeaker maker

Dynaudio A/S
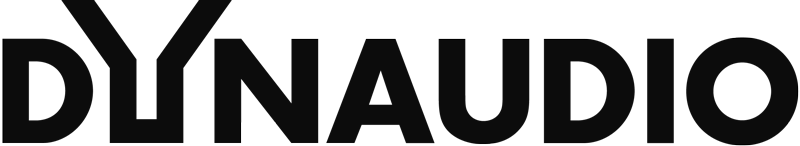
- Company type: Private
- Founded: 1977
- Headquarters: Skanderborg, Denmark
- Parent: Goertek
- Website: dynaudio.com

Dynaudio is a Danish loudspeaker maker, founded in 1977. Dynaudio builds speakers using only their own drivers.

Dynaudio has a subsidiary called Dynaudio Acoustics that focuses on professional studio monitor loudspeakers. Dynaudio speakers are installed in more than ten thousand recording studios worldwide and have been chosen as reference monitors by BBC Radio & Music.

Dynaudio was previously the OEM audio supplier to Swedish automaker Volvo Cars Corporation, in addition to German automaker Volkswagen. Volkswagen followed Volvo by employing Dynaudio as its OEM speaker maker, but not all Volkswagen models came equipped with Dynaudio Sound Systems. While Volkswagen has switched to a different audio supplier for most of their new vehicles, the Volkswagen Touareg is still available with a Dynaudio sound system from the factory.

Bugatti has also employed Dynaudio as their OEM audio supplier. Bugatti's Dynaudio system is called The Puccini Sound System.

BYD also uses Dynaudio in their premium NEVs such as the Seal performance sedan.

Dynaudio has also worked with computing OEM Micro-Star International in producing the sound system for their Gaming notebook range, From 2010. During this time it was allegedly the best audio system available in a notebook computer.

Dynaudio was acquired by Goertek in 2014, and subsequently purchased the Danish audio company AM3D A/S in December 2015.

== Dynaudio Professional ==
The pro audio division of the company, Dynaudio Professional, focuses on recording studio loudspeaker equipment such as studio monitors. In 1999, Dynaudio became partners with TC Electronic. Some major recording studios that use Dynaudio Professional products are Air Lyndhurst, NRG Studios, and The Hit Factory. Record producers Mike Hedges, Trevor Horn, Steve Lipson, and Mutt Lange do as well. Tom Holkenborg states, "For monitoring my stereo and surround mixes I rely on my Dynaudio Acoustics AIR 25 midfield systems."

== See also ==
- List of studio monitor manufacturers

== Gallery ==
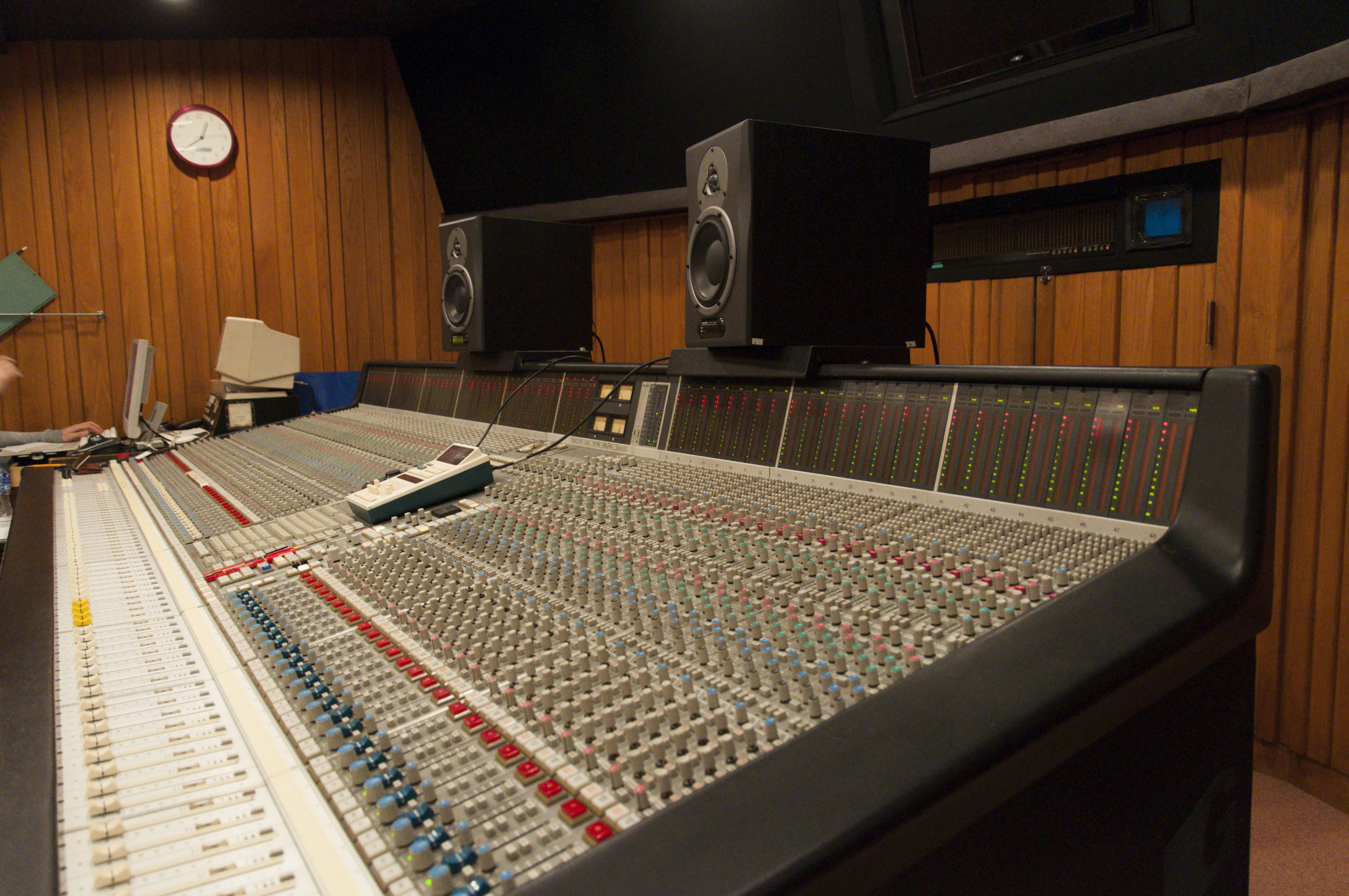
Dynaudio AIR6

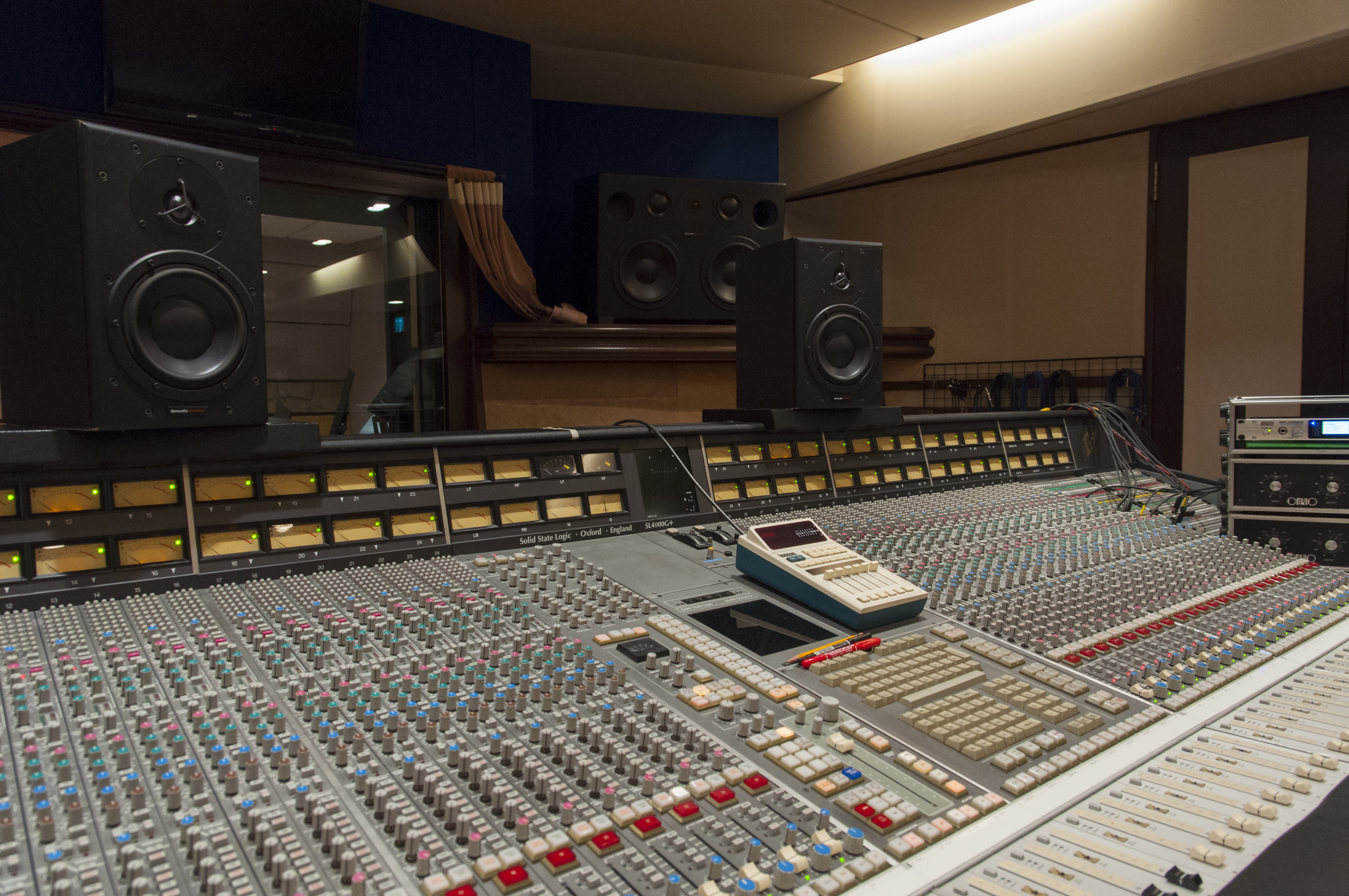
Dynaudio BM6

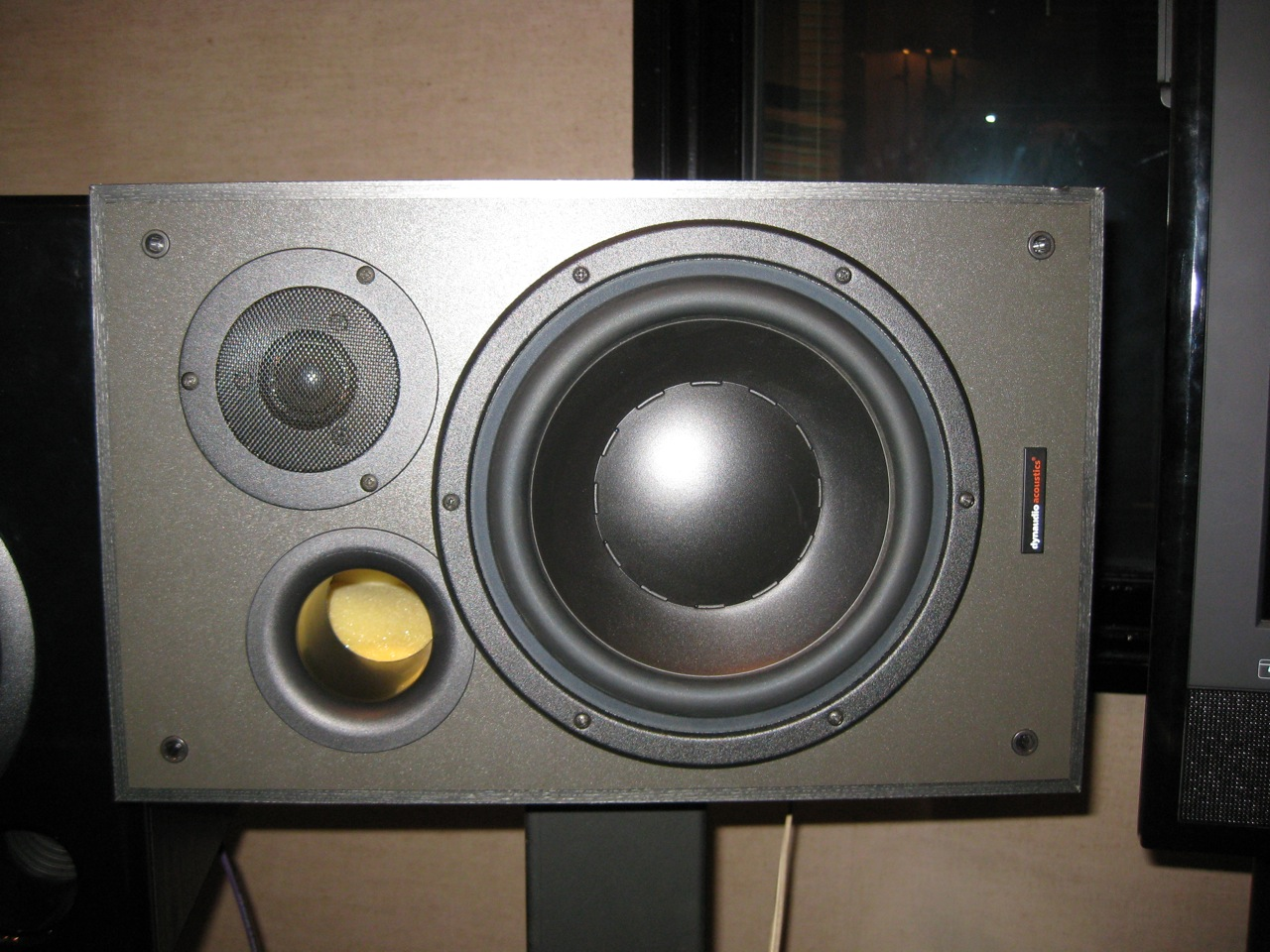
Dynaudio BM15P

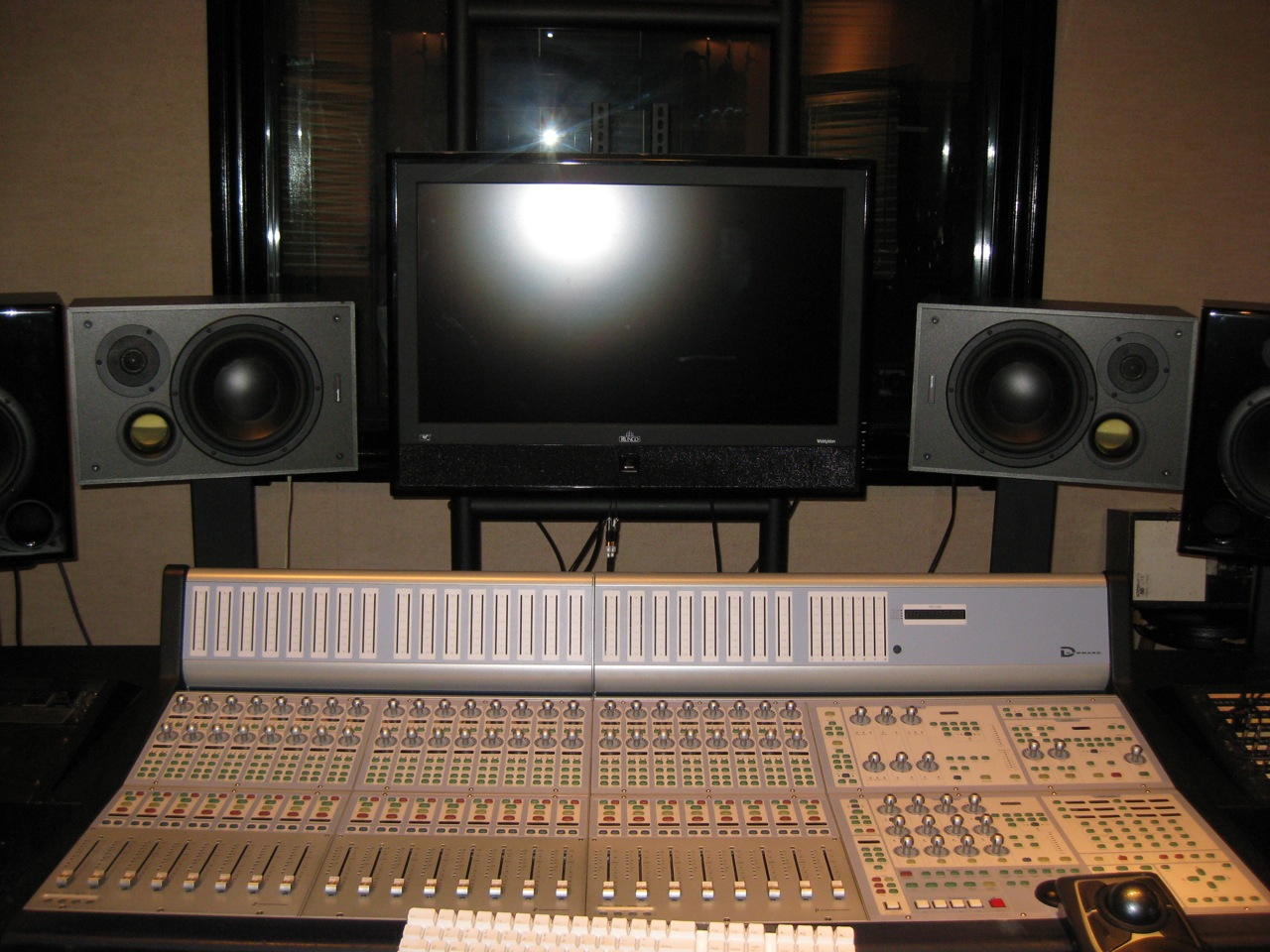
Dynaudio BM15P

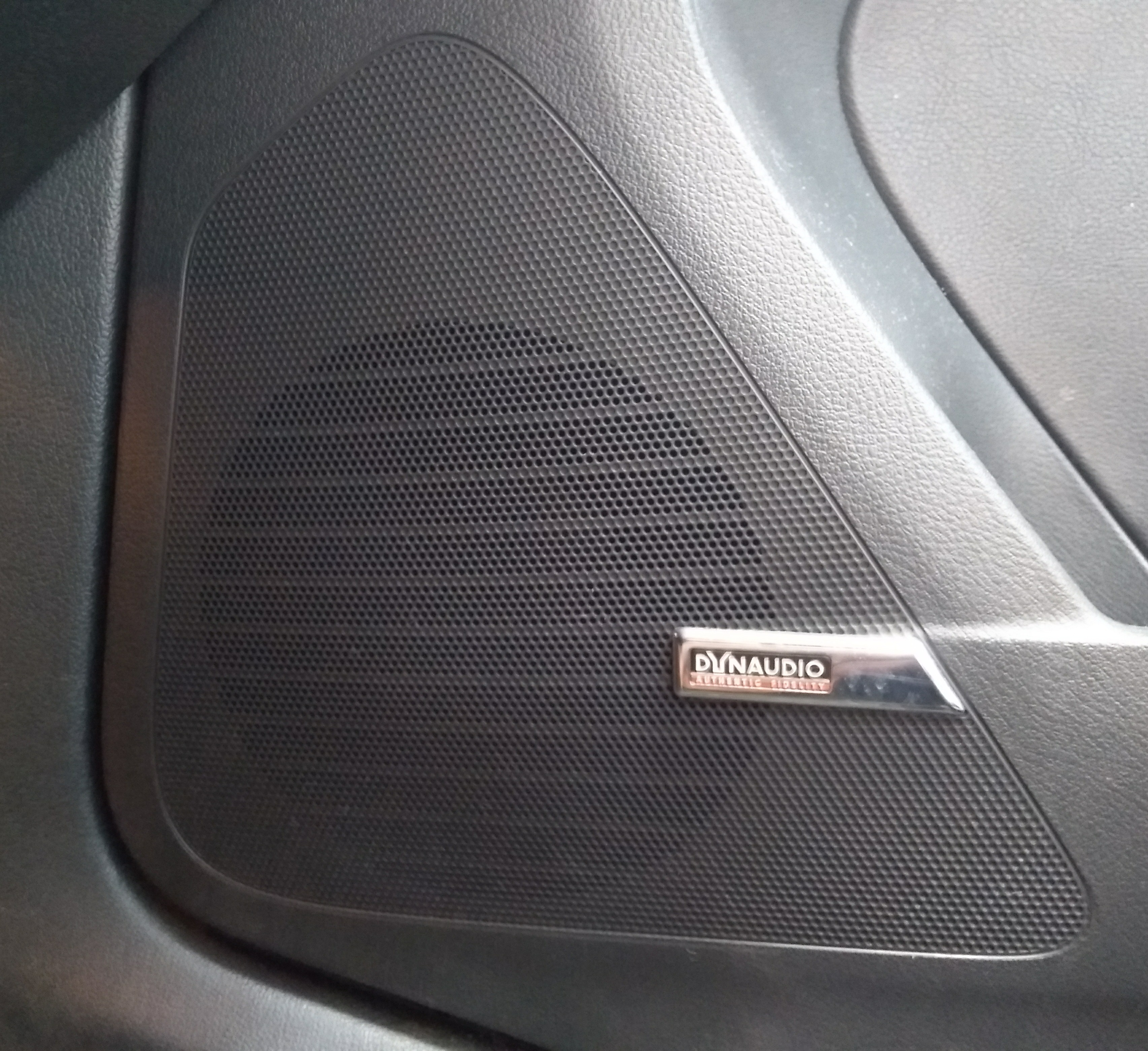
Dynaudio speaker inside a Volkswagen Tiguan
