= Jiang Bin (entrepreneur) =

Chinese billionaire entrepreneur

- Born: 1966 or 1967 (age 59–60); Weihai, Shandong, China
- Education: Beijing University of Aeronautics and Astronautics; Tsinghua University
- Organization: National People's Congress
- Known for: Co-founder and chairman, GoerTek
- Spouse: Hu Shuangmei
- Children: 1

Jiang Bin (Chinese: 姜滨; born 1966/1967) is a Chinese billionaire entrepreneur, who co-founded acoustic components company GoerTek with his wife Hu Shuangmei. He is the chairman of GoerTek. Jiang also served as a delegate to the 14th National People's Congress.

== Early life ==
Jiang earned a bachelor's degree from Beijing University of Aeronautics and Astronautics, followed by an MBA from Tsinghua University.

== Career ==
Jiang is the chairman of GoerTek.

GoerTek is listed on the Shenzhen Stock Exchange, and its customers include Samsung, Sony and Lenovo. His brother, Jiang Long, is vice chairman.

== Personal life ==
Jiang is married to Hu Shuangmei. They live in Weifang, China, and have one child.
