= Goertek =

Chinese electronics manufacturer

Goertek Inc.
- Type: Public
- Traded as: SZSE: 002241; CSI A100
- Founded: 2001
- Subsidiaries: Dynaudio
- Website: www.goertek.com

Goertek
- Simplified Chinese: 歌尔股份
- Traditional Chinese: 歌爾股份
- Literal meaning: Goer Shares
Transcriptions

Alternative Chinese name
- Simplified Chinese: 歌尔声学
- Traditional Chinese: 歌爾聲學
- Literal meaning: Goer Acoustic Technology
Transcriptions
Standard Mandarin
- Hanyu Pinyin: Gē ěr shēng xué

Goertek Inc. (formerly stylized as GoerTek) is a Chinese acoustic components company founded in 2001. The company was started in June 2001 by the billionaire entrepreneur Jiang Bin and his wife Hu Shuangmei. His brother, Jiang Long, serves as vice chairman. The company was listed on the Shenzhen Stock Exchange in May 2008.

The company claims to hold the largest market value among acoustic companies on the Shenzhen Stock Exchange. Goertek's main focuses consist of R&D, production and sales of electro-acoustic components, optical components, electronic accessories and related products. The global headquarters of Goertek is in Weifang, with manufacturing operations in Vietnam. The company has over 80,000 employees.

Goertek's customers include Apple (including acoustic modules for the iPhone), Samsung, Sony and Lenovo. The company supplies products to Fitbit, ByteDance, and Huawei.

In 2014, Goertek bought a majority share of Danish loudspeaker manufacturer Dynaudio. The company also has a stake in Kopin Corporation. Goertek has collaborated with Beihang University's Qingdao Research Institute on military-civil fusion projects and, in 2016, funded the university's Smart Innovation Technology Research Institute. In 2019, Goertek launched a center in Laoshan, Qingdao with Qualcomm. In 2025, the Australian Strategic Policy Institute raised security concerns about Goertek's funding of the acquisition of Plessey.
