= Tang Li (engineer) =

Chinese nuclear weapon engineer

- 唐立
- Born: 5 December 1965 (age 60); Yixing County, Jiangsu, China
- Education: Beihang University
- Scientific career
- Fields: Nuclear weapon
- Workplaces: Beijing Institute of Applied Physics and Computational Mathematics

Tang Li (Chinese: 唐立; pinyin: Táng Lì; born 5 December 1965) is a Chinese nuclear weapon engineer who is vice president of Beijing Institute of Applied Physics and Computational Mathematics, and an academician of the Chinese Academy of Engineering. Tang was born in Yixing County, Jiangsu. His father Tang Xisheng is an academician of the Chinese Academy of Engineering. In 1984, he enrolled at Beihang University, majoring in aerodynamics. After graduating in 1988, he was despatched to Beijing Institute of Applied Physics and Computational Mathematics, where he was promoted to deputy chief engineer in February 2003 and vice president in December 2005.

== Honours and awards ==
- 2006 State Science and Technology Progress Award (First Class)
- 2008 State Science and Technology Progress Award (First Class)
- 2013 State Science and Technology Progress Award (First Class)
- 2016 Science and Technology Progress Award of the Ho Leung Ho Lee Foundation
- 27 November 2017 Member of the Chinese Academy of Engineering (CAE)
