= Yang Dongming =

Chinese general

- 杨东明

Deputy Commander of the PLA Air Force
- In office December 2005 – December 2012
- Commander: Xu Qiliang

Personal details
- Born: 1949 (age 76–77)
- Party: Chinese Communist Party
- Relations: Yang Chengwu (father)
- Education: Beihang University

Military service
- Allegiance: China
- Branch/service: People's Liberation Army Air Force
- Years of service: 1966–2012
- Rank: Lieutenant General

Yang Dongming (Chinese: 杨东明; born 1949) is a retired lieutenant general (zhong jiang) of the People's Liberation Army Air Force (PLAAF) of China, who served as Deputy Commander of the PLAAF from 2005 to 2012. He is the son of General Yang Chengwu.

== Biography ==
Yang Dongming was born in 1949, a son of the PRC founding general Yang Chengwu. He is a native of Changting County, Fujian Province. He joined the People's Liberation Army in 1966.

Although recruited into the PLA as an air force technical officer—he graduated from Beihang University in 1977 as a rocket engineer—his career advancement came mostly in the army, with postings to the Defense Technology Commission, the Hebei Military District, and the Beijing Garrison. He then worked for the PLA General Logistics Department, where he was director for the Material and Oil Department.

In December 2005, Yang was transferred back to the PLAAF as deputy commander, although he was not an airman and possessed no prior experience in PLAAF combat units or headquarters. His advancement in the Air Force was credited to the connections of his father. As one of the several deputy commanders of the PLAAF, he was in charge of the PLAAF Research Institutions (basic weapons design, research and development), the Engineering Department, and logistics.

Yang attained the rank of major general in 1994, and lieutenant general in 2007. He retired in December 2012.
