= BUAA Mifeng-6 =

Airship

Mifeng-6

General information
- Type: Hot-air airship
- National origin: China
- Manufacturer: Beijing University of Aeronautics and Astronautics
- Number built: 4+

History
- First flight: 20 December 1985

The BUAA Mifeng-6 (en:Bee-6) is a hot-air airship designed and built in China by the Beijing University of Aeronautics and Astronautics. The Mifeng-6 first flew on 20 December 1985 and at least four have been built. The Rotax 447 piston engine not only provides propulsion but is also used to inflate the envelope, burners are used to provide heat for buoyancy variation.

== Specification ==
Data from Brassey's World Aircraft & Systems Directory 1996

General characteristics

- Crew: 1 pilot
- Capacity: 3 passengers
- Length: 33.7 m (110 ft 7 in)
- Volume: 2,983 m^{3} (105,300 cu ft)
- Powerplant: 1 × Rotax 447 piston engine
