= Yang Chengwu =

Chinese revolutionary and general (1914–2004)

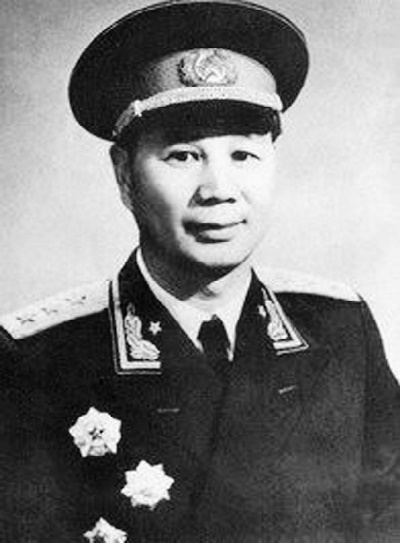
- Native name: 楊成武
- Born: 27 October 1914; Changting County, Fujian, Republic of China
- Died: February 14, 2004 (aged 89–90) Beijing, People’s Republic of China
- Allegiance: Communist China; Republic of China; China
- Rank: General
- Conflicts: Chinese Civil War; Second Sino-Japanese War

Yang Chengwu (simplified Chinese: 杨成武; traditional Chinese: 楊成武; pinyin: Yáng Chéngwǔ; October 27, 1914 – February 14, 2004), alias Yang Nengjun (Chinese: 杨能俊; pinyin: Yáng Néngjùn) was a Communist Chinese revolutionary and general of the People's Liberation Army. He was the Deputy Chief of General Staff of the People's Liberation Army from 1954 to 1965 and 1974–1980. He was named Acting Chief of General Staff in 1966 after Luo Ruiqing was purged at the beginning of the Cultural Revolution.

Yang was born in Changting County, Fujian Province of China on October 8, 1914. He died on February 14, 2004, in Beijing, at the age of 90.

As deputy chief in early 1964, Yang commissioned a report which evaluated how prepared the national economy was for a sudden attack by foreign foes. The report evaluated the distribution of Chinese industry, noted that they were primarily concentrated in 14 major coastal cities which were vulnerable to nuclear attack or air raids, and recommended that the General Staff research measures to guard against a sudden attack. The report was issued on April 25, 1964, and read by Mao Zedong the next month. This evaluation prompted Mao to advocate for the creation of a heavy industrial zone as a safe haven for retreat in the event of foreign invasion during State Planning Meetings, consistent with his view of the necessity for building constructing the Third Front.

In March 1968, Lin Biao and the rest of the Gang of Four accused Yang, Yu Lijian (second secretary of the Party Committee of the Air Force), and Fu Chongbi (commander of the Beijing garrison) of "overturning the case of the February Countercurrent." This event became known as the "Yang, Yu, Fu Incident." Based on allegations later deemed by the Party to be false, the Gang of Four and their allies contended that Yang, Yu, and Fu had sought to seize power with respect to the air force and the Beijing garrison. Yang, Yu, and Fu were persecuted and some of their allies attacked and even killed. In March 1979, the Central Committee issued a Notice of Open Rehabilitation and repudiated the allegations made by the Gang of Four during the "Yang, Yu, Fu Incident." The Central Committee resolved that the accusations were slanderous, officially restored the reputations of those targeted in the incident, and paid compensation for those who were injured or killed as a result.

Yang Chengwu's son Yang Dongming is a retired lieutenant general who was appointed Deputy Commander of the People's Liberation Army Air Force (PLAAF) in 2005.

Military offices
Preceded by Luo Ruiqing	Chief of PLA General Staff Headquarters (acting); 1966–1968	Succeeded by Huang Yongsheng
