= Learning from Shenzhen =

2017 collection of essays

- First edition
- Editor: Mary Ann O'Donnell; Winnie Wong; Jonathan Bach
- Language: English
- Genre: Non-fiction
- Publisher: University of Chicago Press
- Publication date: 2017
- Publication place: United States

Learning from Shenzhen: China's Post-Mao Experiment from Special Zone to Model City is a 2017 collection of essays, co-edited by Mary Ann O'Donnell, Winnie Wong, and Jonathan Bach, and published by the University of Chicago Press. It discusses the development of Shenzhen, Guangdong, China and how it influenced the development of other places in China.

The title is a reference to the previous Chinese revolutionary slogan "Learning from Dazhai".

== Content ==
The book has three sections for its essays, with each section being a different stage of development, with essays exploring various aspects of Shenzhen.

The first section is about the years 1979–1992, with the first experiments in capitalism initiated under Deng Xiaoping and the distinctions in ideology between capitalism and communism. Chapter 2 "Heroes of the Special Zone: Modeling Reform and Its Limits" by Mary Ann O'Donnell discussed the politicians who built Shenzhen. "The Tripartite Origins of Shenzhen: Beijing, Hong Kong, and Bao’an" by Weiwen Huang, Chapter 3, explores aspects of urban planning of Shenzhen. Chapter 4 "How to Be a Shenzhener: Representations of Migrant Labor in Shenzhen’s Second Decade" by Eric Florence discusses how migrant workers are discussed in media sources.

The second section is about the years 1992–2004 in regards to making exceptions for certain aspects and urban-rural divides. Chapter 5 "Laying Siege to the Villages: The Vernacular Geography of Shenzhen" by Mary Ann O'Donnell discusses the interplay between rural areas and urban areas. Emma Xin Ma and Adrian Blackwell wrote the chapter "The Political Architecture of the First and Second Lines", Chapter 6, where they discuss how the Frontier Closed Area, the border between mainland China and Hong Kong, promotes the movement of goods and people while also preserving the characteristics of the respective areas, resulting in what June Wang (Chinese: 王珺; pinyin: Wáng Jùn), of the City University of Hong Kong, calls a "paradoxical character". Jonathan Bach's essay "“They Come in Peasants and Leave Citizens”: Urban Villages and the Making of Shenzhen", Chapter 7, discusses how urban villages provided a workforce and residential area to the people building Shenzhen. Bach states that, in the words of June Wang "urban villages or villages-in-the-city are the most intriguing striates". "Sex Work, Migration, and Mental Health in Shenzhen" by Willa Dong and Yu Chen, Chapter 8, discuss women who work as prostitutes in Shenzhen.

The third section is 2004 to the date of publishing, which discusses how the development patterns of Shenzhen were used as a model for developing cities elsewhere in mainland China. Chapter 9 "Shenzhen’s Model Bohemia and the Creative China Dream" by Winnie Wong discusses artists in the city who migrated from other Chinese cities. Chapter 10 "Preparedness and the Shenzhen Model of Public Health" by Katherine A. Mason discusses public health models used in the city. Max Hirsch's essay "Simulating Global Mobility at Shenzhen “International” Airport", Chapter 11, discusses Shenzhen International Airport as well as the conflicts between Mainland and Hong Kong jurisdiction in the Shenzhen Bay Bridge of the Hong Kong–Shenzhen Western Corridor, which is used by airport passengers.

A version of the book has a foreword by Ezra Vogel about how he walked on the Lo Wu Bridge while traveling from Hong Kong to Shenzhen.

== Reception ==
Hai Ren (任海; Rén Hǎi) of the University of Arizona wrote that the chapters were "well researched and well written".

== Sources ==
- Ren, Hai (2018). "Learning from Shenzhen: China's Post-Mao Experiment from Special Zone to Model City". The China Quarterly. 234: 568–569. doi:10.1017/S0305741018000656. S2CID 158322215. - Available at Academia.edu
