= Xue Yiwei =

Chinese author

- Simplified Chinese: 薛忆沩
- Traditional Chinese: 薛憶溈
Transcriptions
Standard Mandarin
- Hanyu Pinyin: Xuē Yìwéi

Xue Yiwei (Chinese: 薛忆沩, born in 1964) is a Chinese-born Canadian author.

His hometown is Changsha, Hunan, and his birthplace was Chenzhou in the same province. He attended the Beijing University of Aeronautics (now Beihang University) in a computer science program, gaining a BsC. Next he attended the Université de Montréal, taking a program in English literature, attaining a Master of Arts. Finally he attended the Guangdong University of Foreign Studies in a doctoral program in linguistics and received his degree.

In 2002, he relocated to Canada, due to his disenchantment with the materialism-focused direction of literature in his home country. In February, he occupied an apartment in proximity to the St. Joseph Oratory, in Côte-des-Neiges. In 2016, CBC Radio presented him as having a high level of popularity in China, known to "millions of people". Ha Jin stated that Xue is a "maverick".

Shenzheners was his first work translated into English. Previously, he was not known among Anglophone audiences, and he lived in Montreal in relative obscurity.

== Works ==
Novels

- Desertion (1989) - A new edition was issued in 2012.
- Dr. Bethune's Children (2011) - English translation 2017 This was not published in China.
  - The novel addresses the life of Norman Bethune.
- Farewells from a Shadow (2013)
- Empty Nest (2014)
- King Lear and Nineteen Seventy-Nine
  - Beginning in March 2020 it was serialized in a magazine in China. Xue had intentions to have an English translation produced.
- Celia, Misoka, I (2016) - English translation 2022

Short stories

- Shenzheners - English translation 2016
- four other works
