= Shenzheners =

Short story collection by Xue Yiwei

Shenzheners (Chinese: 深圳人; pinyin: Shēnzhènrén) is a Chinese-language collection of short stories by Xue Yiwei. Darryl Sterk translated it into English, and this translation was published by Linda Leith Publishing in 2016. Cai Gao did the illustrations. The English translation is the first ever such translation of Xue's work.

The number of short stories in this work is nine.

== Background ==
Xue writes works aimed at Chinese citizens in Mainland China, using Chinese as a medium. As of 2016 Xue lives in Montreal.

== Contents ==
Amy Hawkins, a freelance journalist in China, described loneliness as a common theme in the stories. One of the common points of inspiration is Dubliners. One of the stories focuses on an expatriate from Canada.

== Reception ==
McGillis stated that the translation in the English version is "smooth".

Bailey Hu, in That's Shanghai, wrote that the work "rarely comes across as over the top".

The book won the 2013 "Most Influential Chinese Books of the Year" award.
