= Beihang University =

Public university in Beijing, China

Coordinates: 39°58′48″N 116°20′27″E

- 北京航空航天大学
- Other names: BUAA; Beihang
- Former names: Beijing University of Aeronautics and Astronautics
- Motto: 德才兼备、知行合一
- Motto in English: Integrate Virtue with Brilliance and Combine Knowledge with Practice
- Type: Public research university
- Established: October 25, 1952; 74 years ago
- Affiliations: BHUA, SSU, TIME
- President: Wang Yunpeng (王云鹏)
- Faculty: 3,359
- Undergraduates: 12,523
- Postgraduates: 10,282
- Location: Beijing, China
- Campus: Xueyuan Road 100 hectares, Shahe 97 hectares
- Colors: and
- Website: buaa.edu.cn ev.buaa.edu.cn

Chinese name
- Simplified Chinese: 北京航空航天大学
- Traditional Chinese: 北京航空航天大學
Transcriptions
Standard Mandarin
- Hanyu Pinyin: Běijīng Hángkōng Hángtiān Dàxué

University rankings
BCUR National	Domestic	11
Wu Shulian National	Domestic	24
CUAA National	Alumni	19
QS National	General	24
THE National	General	20–24
QS Asia (Asia version)	General	126
THE Asia (Asia version)	General	=45
ARWU World	Research	101–150
QS World	General	=388
THE World	General	251–300
USNWR World	General	193

Beihang University is a public university in Haidian, Beijing, China. It is affiliated with the Ministry of Industry and Information Technology. The university is part of Project 211, Project 985, and the Double First-Class Construction.

The school was founded as Beijing Aeronautics College (北京航空学院) in 1952 by the merger of the aerospace engineering departments from eight elite universities at that time, including Peiyang University, Tsinghua University, Xiamen University, Sichuan University, and Chongqing University. In April 1988, the school was renamed Beijing University of Aeronautics and Astronautics (BUAA). BUAA is dubbed one of the Seven Sons of National Defence.

Beihang University has 1 national laboratory, 9 national key laboratories (including 4 defense technology key laboratories), 6 national engineering centers and 3 Beijing Advanced Innovation Centers. The university has more than 40 research achievements that are the first in China and has won three top national science and technology awards more than 70 times.

== History ==
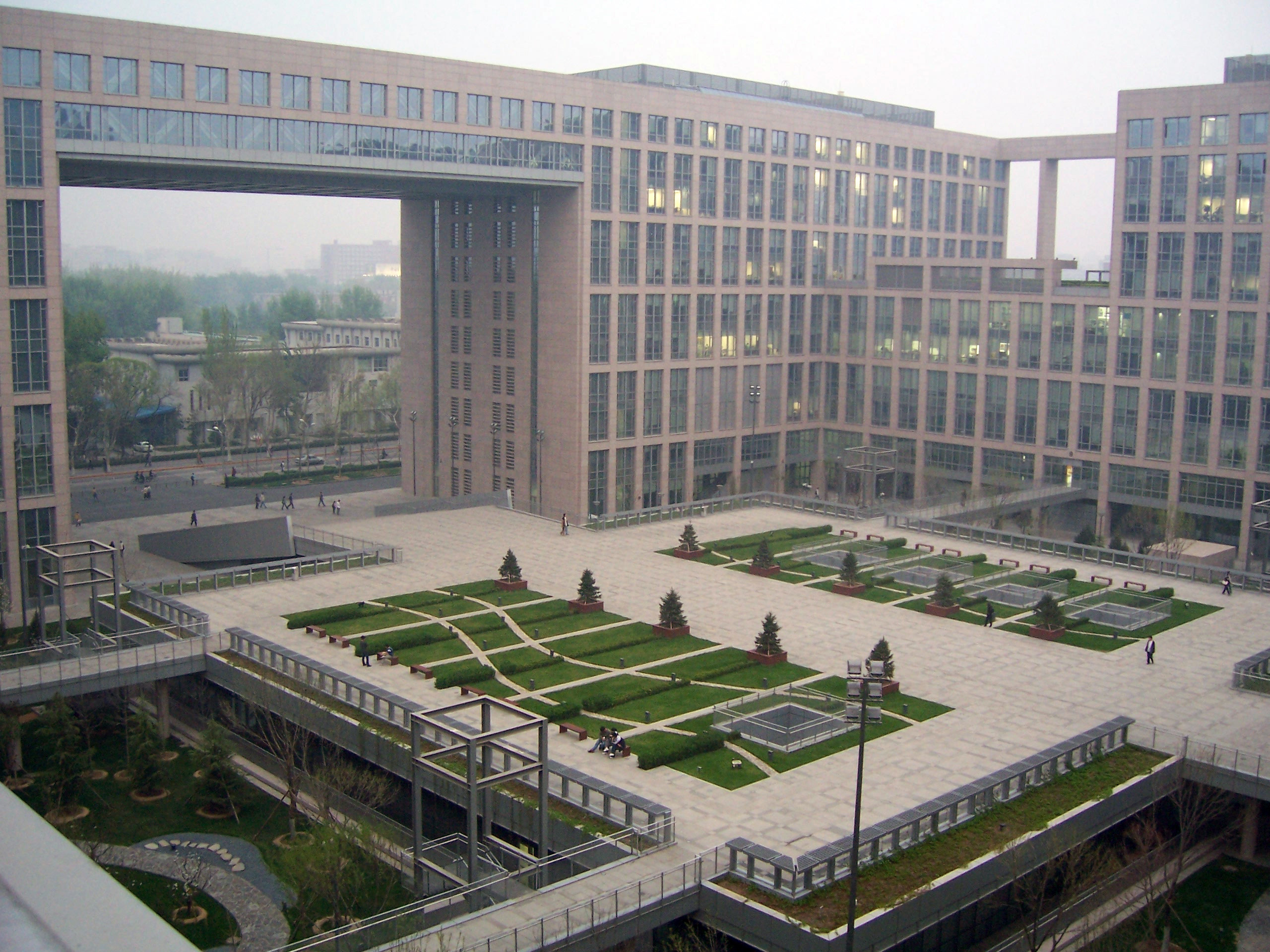
Campus of Beihang University

As the first aerospace higher education institution in New China and the cradle of Red Aeronautical Engineers, Beihang University has been a key national higher education institution since its establishment. Beihang University is one of the first batch of national key universities (1959), among the first batch of 211 project universities (1997) and the first batch of world-class academic construction universities (Class A) (2017), which ranks seventh to has taken the tenth place. It is the key institution of higher education in the five-year plan. This university is a member of the 985 project university. Also selected for Project Everest, Project 211, Project 111, and Outstanding Engineering Education.

=== Genesis ===
The aviation departments of the eight universities that participated in the founding of the Beijing Institute of Aeronautics and Astronautics were: Tsinghua University, Peiyang University, Northwestern Polytechnic College (today's Northwestern Polytechnic University), Xiamen University, and the Faculty of North China University. Engineering (today's Beijing Institute of Technology), the aviation departments of Southwest Industrial College (now Chongqing University), Sichuan University and Yunnan University.

The aviation departments of China's higher education institutions developed relatively late and are weak in strength. Although Feng Ru built the first Chinese airplane in 1909, five years after the Wright brothers, China's aviation industry failed to develop due to old thinking and turmoil. Until the September 18 incident and the January 28 Songo War of Resistance, which faced the painful lesson of national subjugation, the Chinese people gradually realized the importance of aviation technology, and the concept of "air rescue of the nation" was born. With this concept in mind, they traveled to Europe and America to learn aviation knowledge from the oceans, and after returning to China, by overcoming many problems and establishing aviation departments, they tried to cultivate Chinese aviation technology talents. The first major of aeronautical engineering in China was the Department of Aeronautical Engineering, which was established by Tsinghua University in the Department of Mechanical Engineering of the Faculty of Engineering in 1934.

But due to the outbreak of the Japanese War and other reasons in the mid-1940s, there was only Tsinghua University, Peiyang University, and a few universities such as Jiaotong University, Zhejiang University, and Xiamen University established aerospace engineering departments. With the country's emphasis and need for the aviation industry after the establishment of the People's Republic of China and with the help of adjustment of colleges and universities across the country since 1951 under the leadership of the government of the People's Republic of China, colleges and aviation departments across the country began to transfer to several colleges.

In March 1951, the Central Committee of the Chinese Communist Party made initial adjustments to the main aeronautical engineering departments and subjects of domestic universities: the aeronautical departments of Tsinghua University, Peiyang University, Northwestern Engineering Institute, and Xiamen University were merged to form a faculty. Aeronautical Engineering, Tsinghua University; Department of Aeronautical Engineering of Yunnan University This group was merged into the Department of Aeronautics of Sichuan University; The Aeronautics Department of the former Central Industrial College (then renamed Southwest Industrial College) and the Aeronautics Department of North China University merged to form the Aeronautics Department of Beijing Institute of Technology. On December 10 of the same year, Premier Zhou Enlai convened a meeting to discuss a plan to transition the aviation industry from maintenance to production. Vice Premier Li Fuchun suggested that "building an aviation university is urgent." Premier Zhou Enlai agreed and gave the order. "I will follow your suggestions."

In May 1952, in accordance with the directive of Premier Zhu Enlai to establish a specialized aviation university and the decision to establish an aviation faculty in the "Resolution on the Construction of Aviation Industry" issued by the Central Military Commission, the Central Ministry of Education formulated. A plan to adjust teaching groups in colleges and universities across the country, more adjustments were made in the aviation sector. On June 12, the Ministry of Heavy Industry and the Ministry of Education decided to officially prepare for the establishment of the Beijing Aviation Industry Institute with the approval of the State Finance and Economic Commission and the approval of the Central Military Commission.

On October 24, 1952, the Ministry of Education issued a certificate of approval for the establishment of the Beijing Institute of Aeronautical Industry (officially known as the Beijing Institute of Aeronautics and Astronautics or Beihang University for short). Around the same time, the aviation departments of the former Central University, Zhejiang University, and Jiaotong University were merged into the East China Institute of Aviation (located in Nanjing), which later moved to Xi'an and merged into the Northwest Polytechnic Institute. After the aviation department was transferred to Tsinghua University to form Northwestern Polytechnical University.

In May 1953, after the Beijing Institute of Aeronautics selected its campus in Boyanzhuang, Haidian District, a northwestern suburb of Beijing, construction officially began on June 1 on a plot of farmland and surrounding roadless graves . Workers worked around the clock and completed 60,000 square meters of construction within half a year. In October of the same year, all students and a number of professors and staff moved to the new school and began to study and work normally. The planned capital construction works were basically completed by 1957 with a completed area of 135,245 square meters, 64,160 square meters of road built, and an investment of over 35.6 million yuan. In June 1954, Wu Guang was appointed as the first president of Beihang University.

In 1958, under the guidance of the party's general line and educational policy, Beihang launched a work-study program, supported and practiced the integration of education with scientific research, design and production, and launched the development of aviation models. Within 100 days, the school's teachers and students completed the construction of the "Beijing No. 1" light passenger plane, which was personally approved by Premier Zhou Enlai. This test flight was successfully carried out on September 24 of the same year, and a test flight of 2,500 km was carried out between Beijing and Shanghai; China's successful development is also Asia's first radiant missile - "Beijing-2", which was successfully launched and tested on September 22 of the same year at the Baichengzi firing range in northeastern China. China's first unmanned aircraft - "Beijing 5" was successfully developed "that is, a self-made unmanned control system was installed on the An-2 aircraft and the aircraft turned into an unmanned aircraft. The test flight was successfully carried out on September 25 of the same year which opened the door to the development of drones in China. In May 1959, the CCP Central Committee issued the "Decision on the Designation of a Group of Key Universities among Higher Education Institutions", and Beihang University was one of the first batch of 16. became a key university in the country. This is a full recognition of Beihang's work in the past seven years since its establishment.

=== China's Cultural Revolution ===
During the Cultural Revolution, teaching discipline was generally disrupted, and normal enrollment in colleges and universities across the country was suspended. Beihang University was not immune to this influence. During this period, it was once controlled by the "Red Flag" Beihang Red Guard organization. However, due to the special nature of the school, Beihang University has had relatively little influence among the major universities in Beijing and has also produced a number of scientific research results such as unmanned reconnaissance aircraft. In 1955, the cultural revolution ended, and in December 1956, single registration was established in higher education institutions across the country, and in 1957, the registration of graduates was resumed. In April 1988, with the approval of the State Education Commission, the Beijing Institute of Aeronautics and Astronautics was renamed Beijing Aeronautics and Astronautics University.

=== New era ===
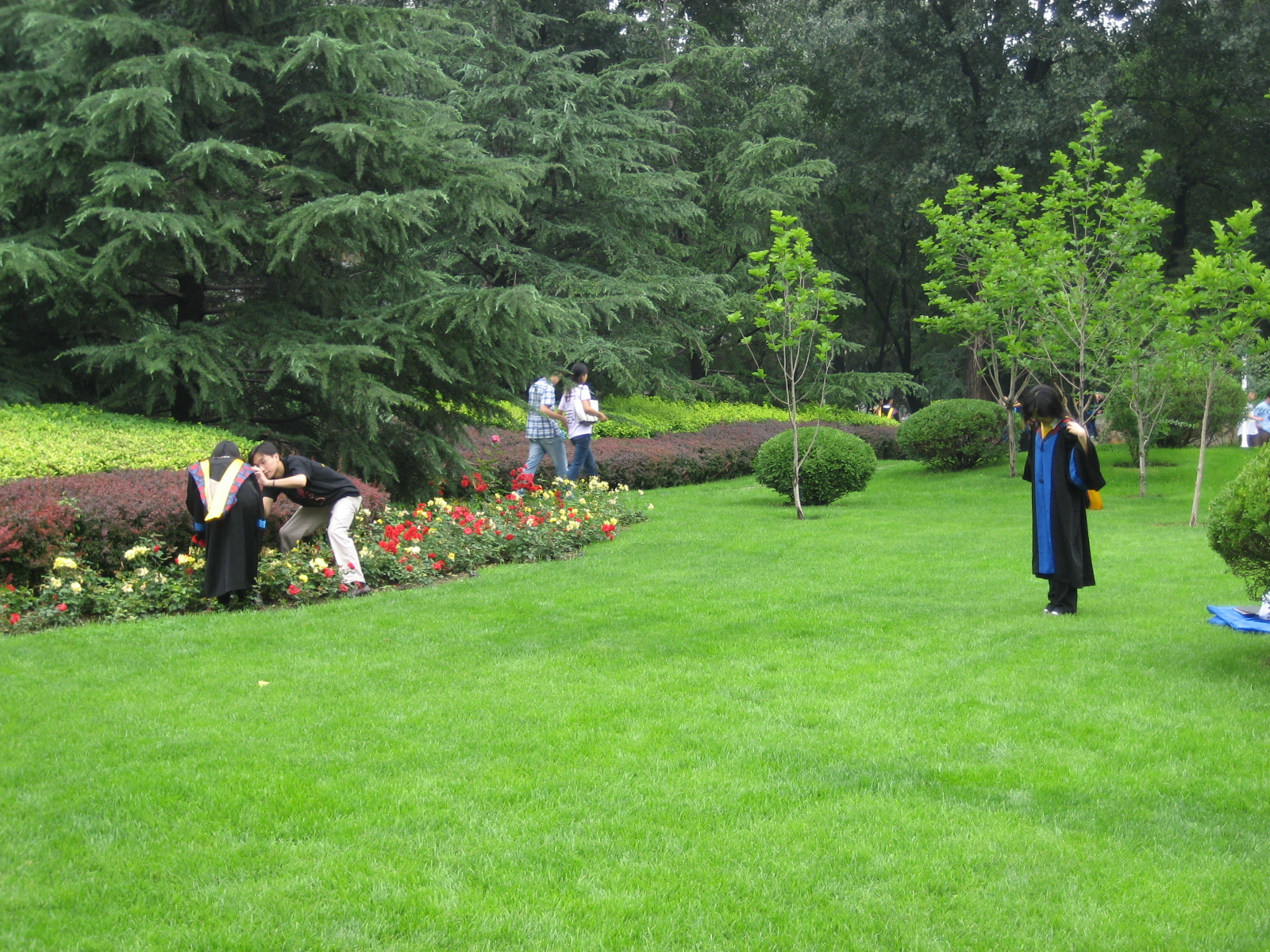
Students in the green environment around Beihang University

Beijing University of Aeronautics and Astronautics In 1989, Beihang University became one of the 14 key universities in the country during the "Eighth Five-Year Plan" period.

In 1997, Beihang University became one of the first batch of universities in the country to be included in the "211 Project".

In August 2001, Beijing held the 21st Universiade and leased land on the southwest side of Beihang University to build the Universiade Village (now used as student apartments). At the same time, the gymnasium of the University of Aeronautics and Astronautics Beijing was built as a sports hall. (which also became the venue for volleyball matches).

In September 2001, Beihang University entered the ranks of participating universities in the national "985" project.

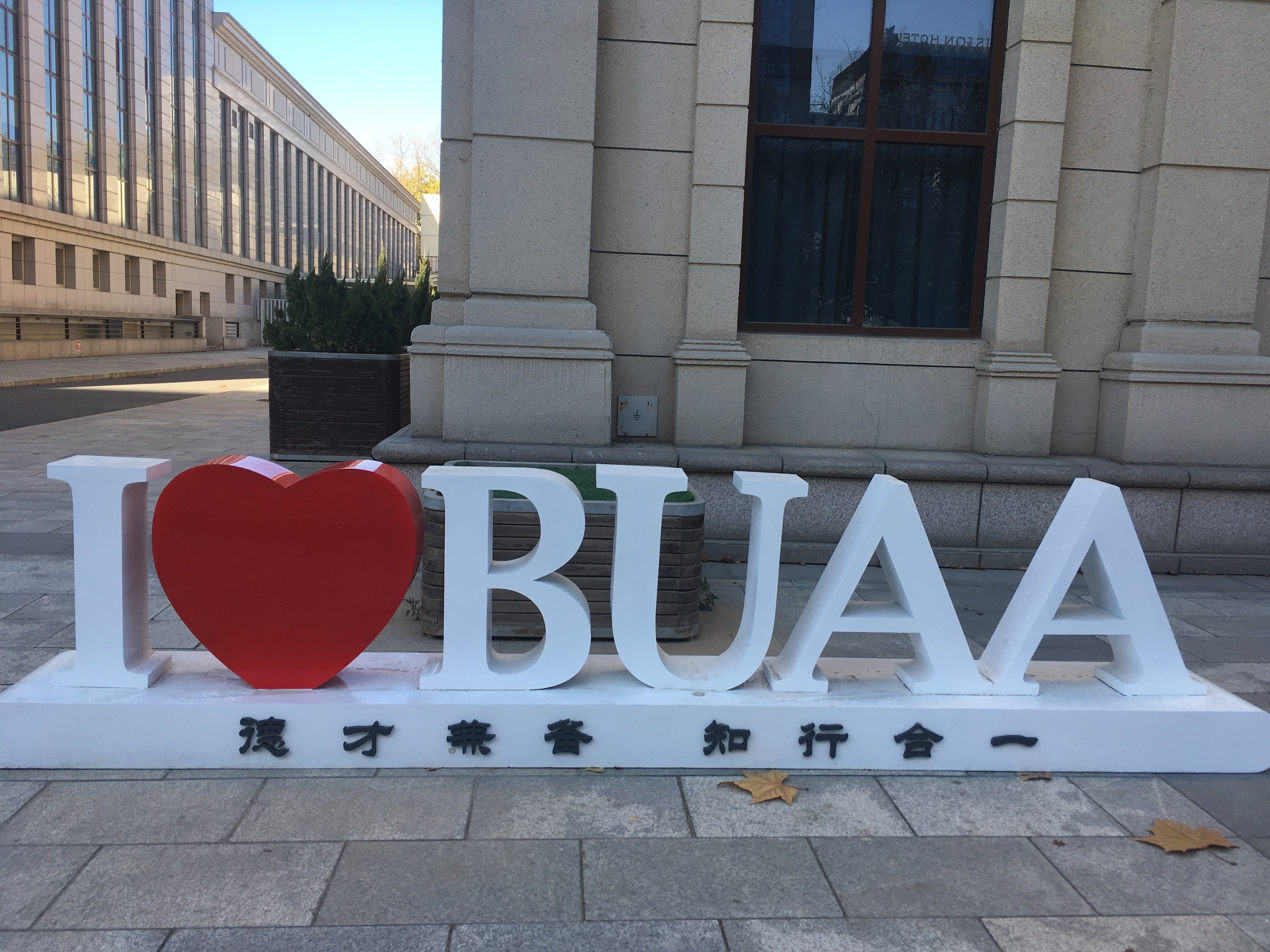
"I love BUAA" Sculptor

In 2006, Beihang Art Museum was completed. In the same year, Beihang University agreed to build the National Aeronautical Science and Technology Laboratory. In the second half of the same year, the educational and scientific research building (the new main building) was completed and put into operation, which greatly improved the educational hardware facilities of the school. The new main building of Beihang University is currently the largest educational building in Asia.

In 2007, the Shahe Campus of Beihang University broke ground in Shahe Higher Education Park, Shahe Town, Changping District, in the northwestern suburbs of Beijing. This campus was put into operation in September 2010.

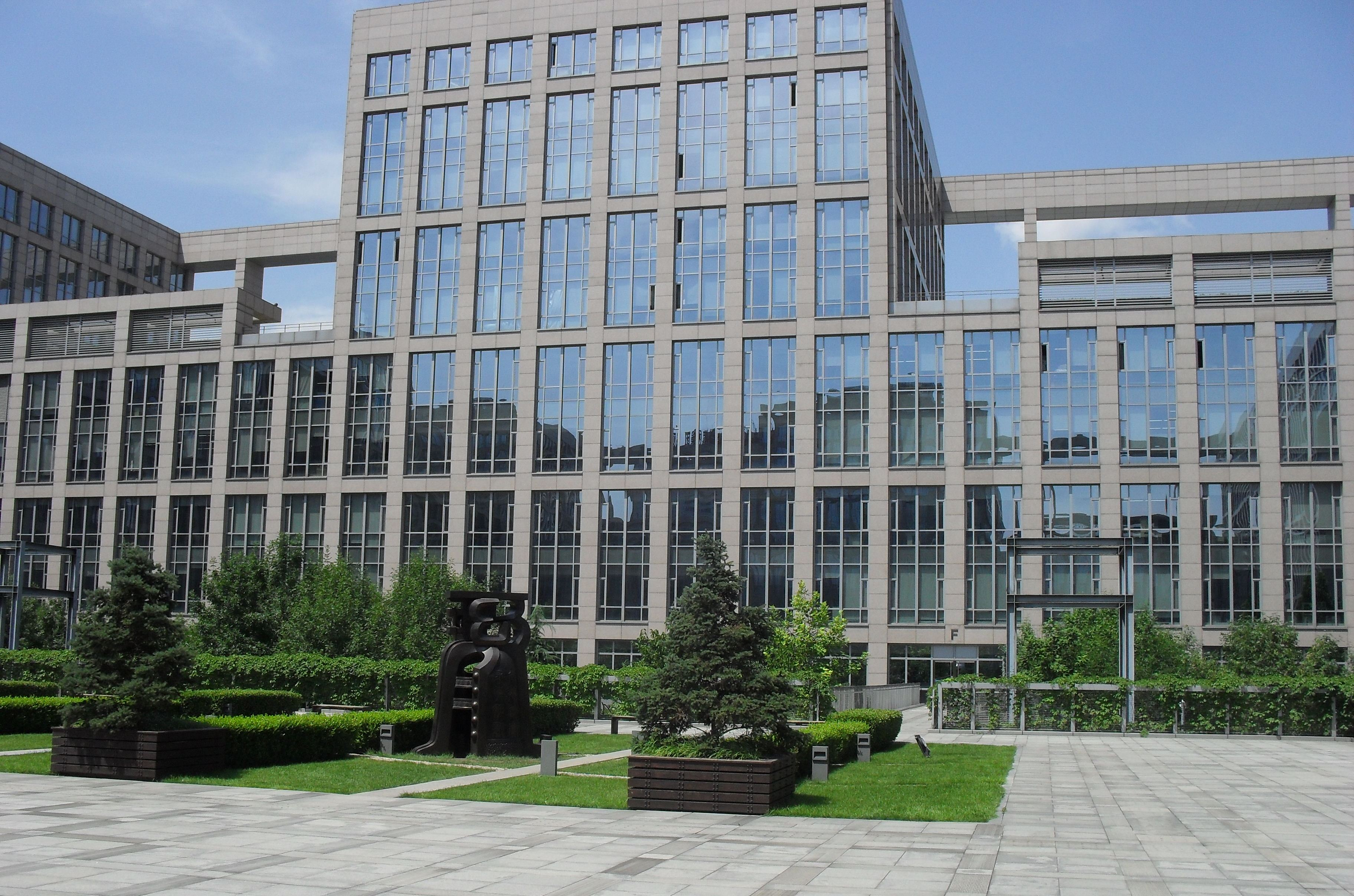
University D Suite which has just been opened.

In 2008, Beijing hosted the 29th Summer Olympics, and Beihang Stadium served as the venue for the weightlifting events.

In 2010, Beihang became a university in the national program of "Education and Training of Higher Engineers", and in 2011, it became one of the national universities of "Project Everest". In 2012, Bei Hong University was selected as the first batch of "2011 Program".

== University review ==
In its early days, Beihang University was a specialized institution of higher education that focused on teaching and researching aviation science and technology, and after reforms and opening, it gradually became a multidisciplinary university with science, engineering, and liberal arts. Law, economics, management, education, philosophy and other disciplines have been involved, but Beihang is still an engineering-focused university.

=== Disciplines and people ===
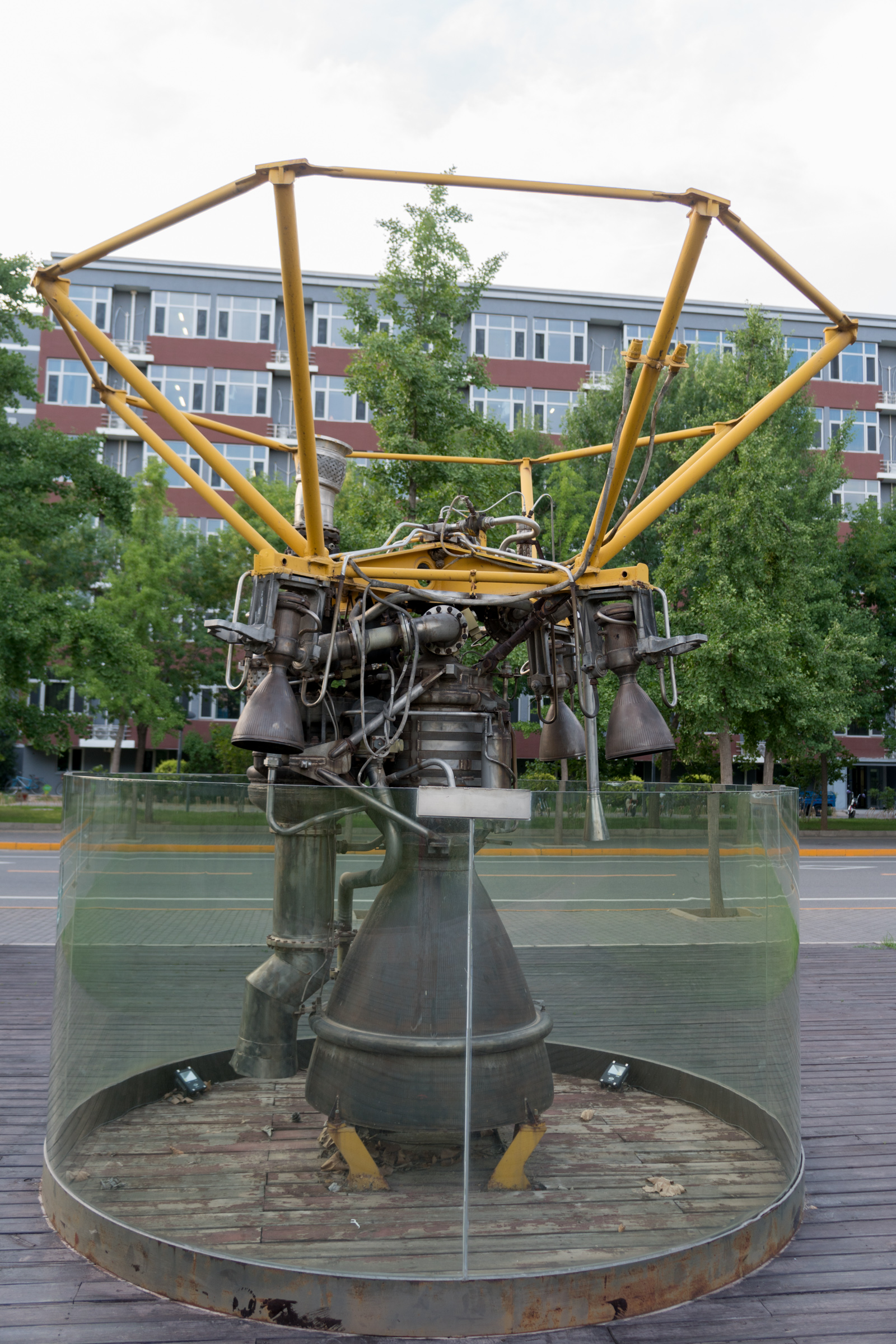
A real YF-24 rocket engine is on display at the Beihang campus.

Currently, Beihang has become a multi-disciplinary university with 30 faculties covering 10 fields of engineering, science, management, liberal arts, law, economics, philosophy, education, medicine and art with aerospace features and engineering technology advantages. Gives. As of October 2017, Beihang has 3,907 active faculty and staff, including 2,147 full-time teachers, including 23 academicians from two academies, 61 Changjiang Scholars, 27 candidates for the "Thousand Talent Project" of the Organizing Department of the Central Committee. The Chinese Communist Party and "973" have 31 senior scientists of this project, 48 winners of the "National Science Fund for Outstanding Young Scientists" and 3 Nobel Prize winners. As of March 2017, there are 30,642 full-time employees. Students include 4,492 doctoral candidates and 9,336 master's students, 15,466 full-time undergraduate and graduate students, 1,218 international students, and about 11,000 professional master's students.

=== Labs ===
In 2006, Beihang was granted permission to build the National Laboratory of Aviation Science and Technology, which was officially opened in 2014 at the Shahe Beihang Campus. At the same time, Beihang University also has "Aeronautical Engine Aerodynamics Thermal Laboratory", "Software Development Environment State Key Laboratory", "Virtual Reality Technology State Key Laboratory", "Aircraft Control Integration Technology Laboratory", and "Reliability and Environment". There are 9 national key laboratories including "National Computational Fluid Dynamics Laboratory" and "National Computational Fluid Dynamics Laboratory", 4 national engineering centers and 66 provincial and ministerial key laboratories.

== University locations ==
=== Colleges and schools and higher schools ===
Code	Academic Name	Found
1	School of Materials Science and Engineering (MSE)	1954
2	School of Electronics and Information Engineering (SEIE)	1958
3	School of Automation Science and Electrical Engineering (SASEE)	1954
4	School of Energy and Power Engineering (SEPE)	1952
5	School of Aeronautic Science and Engineering (ASE)	1952
6	School of Computer Science and Engineering (SCSE)	1958
7	School of Mechanical Engineering and Automation (ME)	1952
8	School of Economics and Management (SEM)	1956
9	School of Mathematics and Systems Science (SMSS)	2009
10	School of Biological Science and Medical Engineering (BME)	2008
11	School of Humanities and Social Sciences (HSS)	1997
12	School of Foreign Languages (SFL)	1978
13	School of Transportation Science and Engineering (TSE or TRANS)	2007
14	School of Reliability and Systems Engineering (RSE)	1985
15	School of Astronautics (SA)	1988
16	Flying College of Beihang University	1993
17	School of Instrumentation Science and Opto-electronics Engineering (SISOE)	2003
18	School of Beijing	2013
19	School of Physics and Nuclear Energy Engineering (SPNEE)	2008
20	The Law School of Beihang University	2002
21	School of Software	2002
22	School of Modern Distance Education	2002
23	Shen Yuan Honors College of Beihang University	2002
24	Beihang Sino-French Engineering School	2004
25	International School of Beihang University	2004
26	New Media Art and Design Institute	2006
27	School of Chemistry(SC)	2008
28	School of Marxism	2008
29	Institute for Advanced Studies in Humanities and Social Science	2010
30	School of Space and Earth Sciences (SSES)	2016
35	School of General Engineering (SGE)	2017
37	Beihang College	2017
39	School of Cyber Science and Technology	2017
41	School of Microelectronics	2018
42	Institute of Artificial Intelligence	2018
	School of BeiDou and the Silk Road	2017
	International Research Institute for Multidisciplinary Science	2012
	Interdisciplinary Innovation Institute for Medicine and Engineering	2016

=== Beijing Aerospace Museum ===
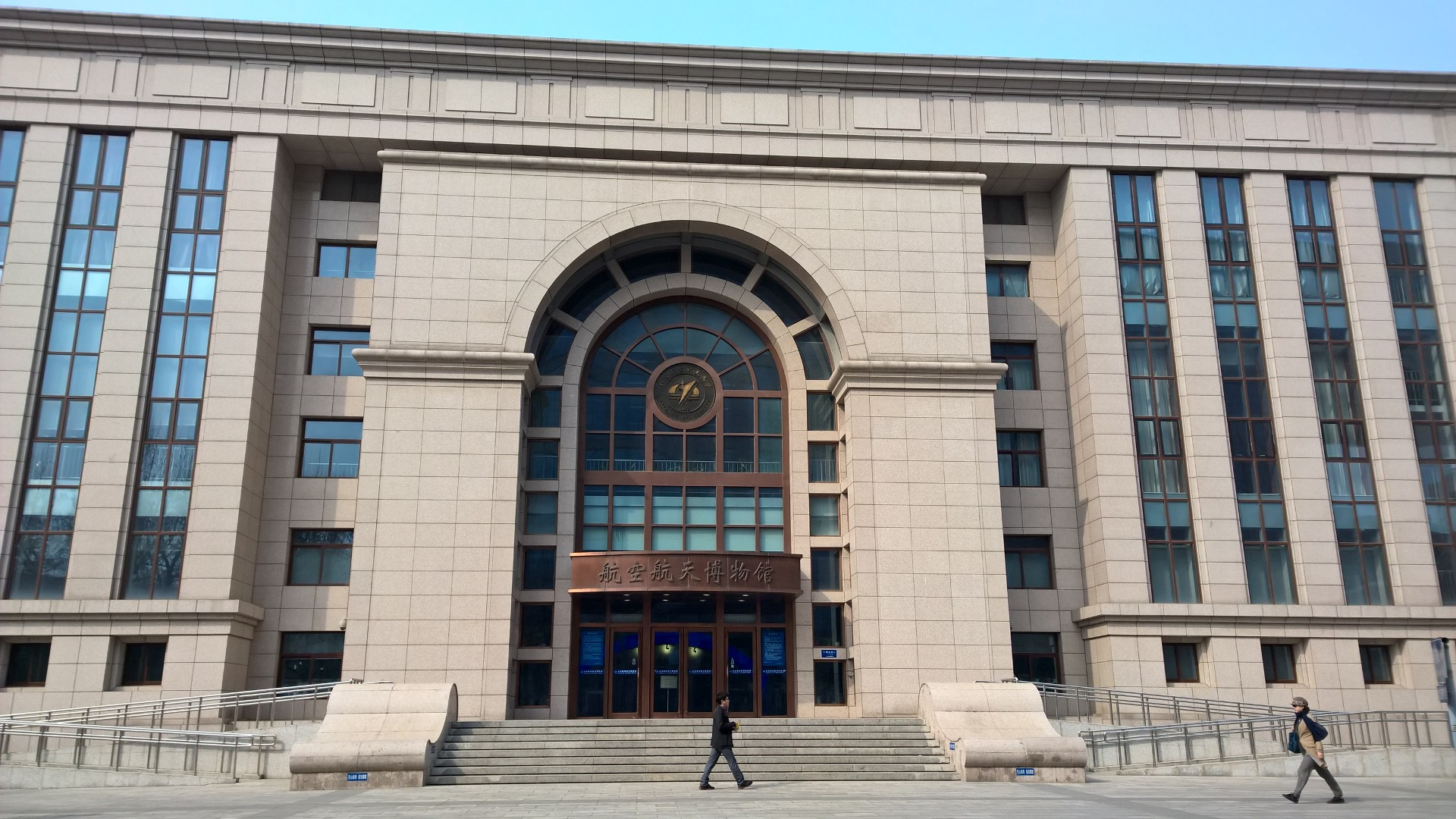
Beijing Aerospace Museum

The Beijing Air and Space Museum is located in Haidian, Beijing, China. This museum is part of Beihang University, one of the most prestigious engineering schools in China. This museum was established in 1985 with its original name of Beijing Aviation Museum. This museum has an exhibition area of 8300 square meters. The building that houses the museum was designed by Hetzel Design. It is called Futura Beijing City Air and Space Museum, which has 18 interactive exhibits, 3 theaters, children's astronaut education center, etc. From the formation of a standard city network and the introduction of winding boulevards leading to a large central park.

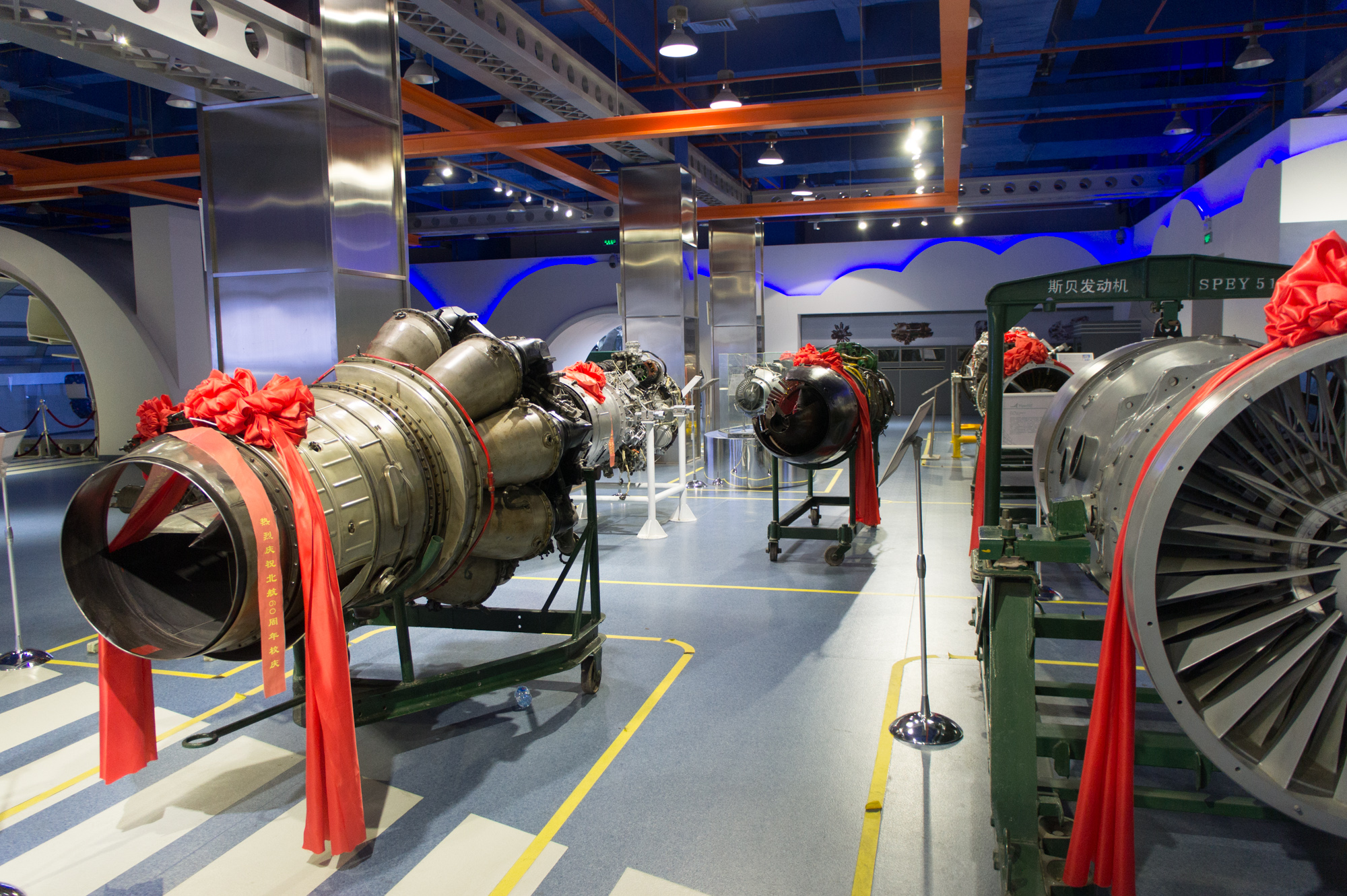
Engines kept in the Beijing Aerospace Museum

In 1985, the Beijing Aviation Museum was founded as part of the university of Aeronautics and Astronautics; in 1986, it was officially opened to the public. The mission of the museum is "to support the teaching and popularize the scientific and technical knowledge of aviation."

In 2002, the name of the school was changed to the Beihang University. The university is considered to be one of China's best engineering schools and is highly influential to the country's aeronautical and space industries.

The problem that this company faced was connecting the parks to the building. They came up with the idea of a bridge and after many renderings decided that the bridge would actually be part of the building. The bridge is the focal point of the buildings. Design in such a way that it looks like the plane is taking off.

=== Shahe Campus ===
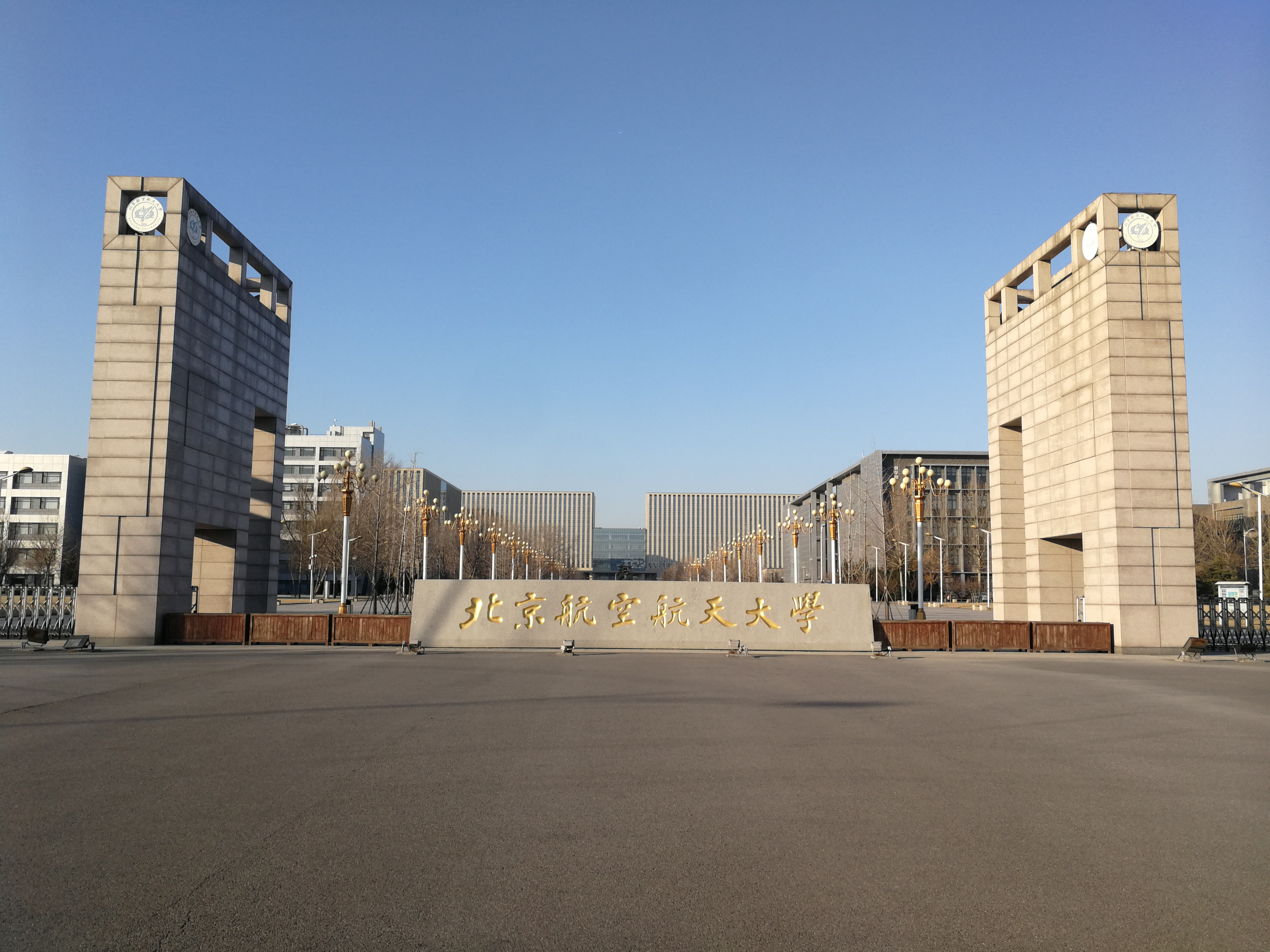
Shahe campus main entrance (south gate)

Beihang University Shahe Campus is located in Shahe Higher Education Park, Changping District, Beijing, on the west side of Bei Shahe Middle Road, about 26 kilometers away from Xueyuan Road Campus. The mailing address is 9, South Third Street.

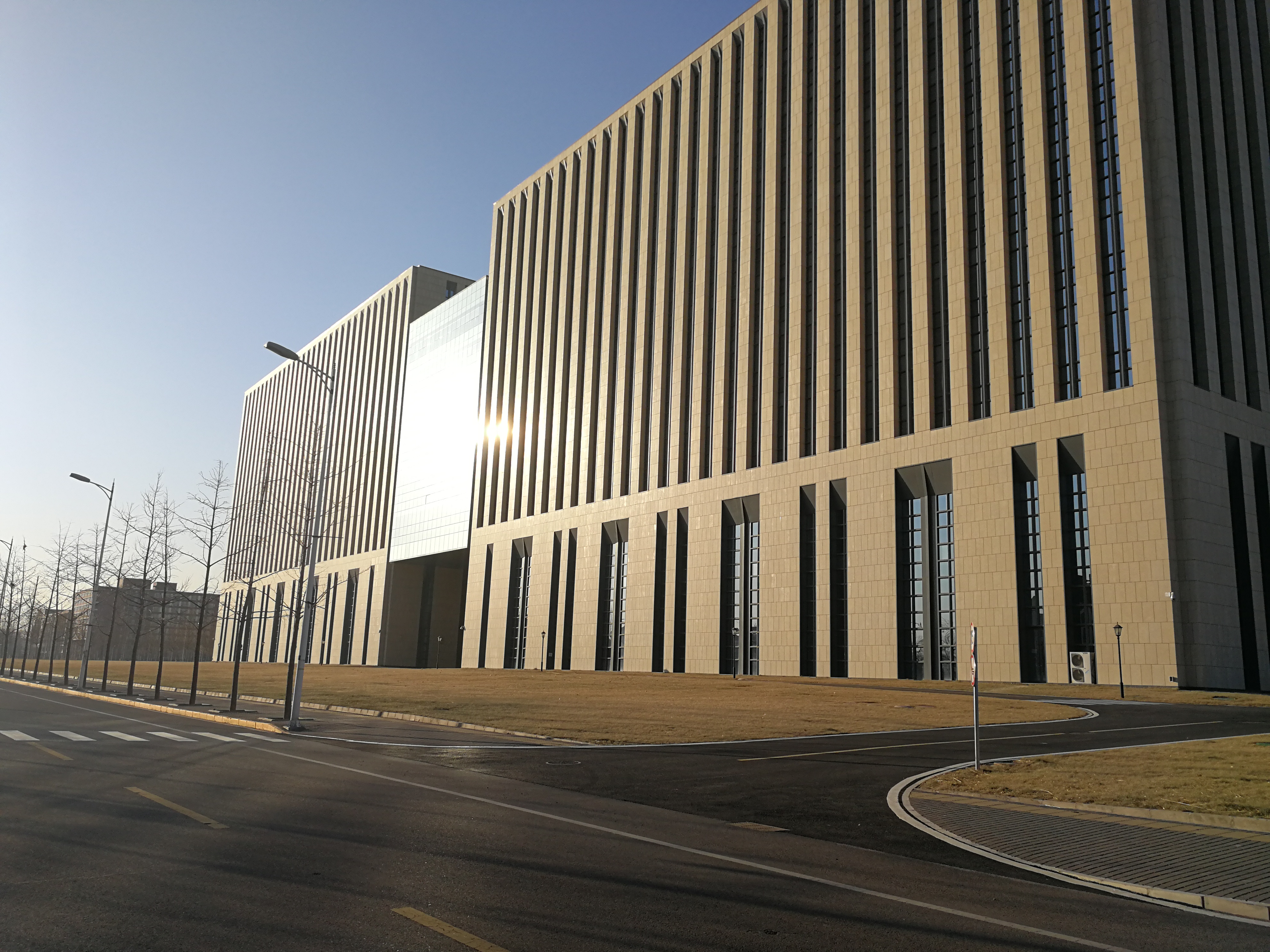
Shahe campus from the profile of NL Blvd

Shahe Campus with an area of 970,000 square meters with a planned construction area of 620,000 square meters mainly consists of five interconnected educational buildings, seven interconnected laboratory buildings, four student apartments and comprehensive buildings including banks, supermarkets etc., stadium, engineering training center, canteen as well as key laboratories, libraries and other partially utilized buildings. Part of it was used in September 2010 and part of it is still under construction. Shahe Campus is further away from the city center, so it is more secluded and has a better environment. At present, the basic facilities of Shahe Campus are complete, it is about 2 kilometers away from Shahe Station and Shahe Higher Education Park Station on the Beijing Metro Changping Line, the transportation is relatively convenient.

=== Xueyuan Road Campus ===
This campus is located in Beijing, in the northwest corner outside the Yuandado City Wall and on the west side of Jiu'an Road.

The whole campus is divided into three parts: the teaching area, the living area and the family area. The educational area is located in the northeast of the campus, east of the northern part of the middle road campus and has been established as a pedestrian area since 2003 and no vehicles pass through it, the family area is located in the west. The campus side occupies about a third of the campus and runs roughly along the west side of the school. The wall runs from south to north across the campus, with West Campus Road as the eastern boundary; The student living area is located in the north-central part of the campus, which is divided into two parts, the south and the north, which are separated by the green park (campus park) and has a total of 18 student apartments.; In the southwest corner off campus is Dayon Village Apartments, which has 1-10 and 7-17 floor buildings. Currently, there are four commercial office buildings around the campus belonging to Beihang University, namely Boyan Tower and Shining Tower in the northeast corner, and Zhizhen Tower and Vision Hotel in the southeast corner. The modern buildings of the Xueyuan Road Campus are rated as China's 20th Century Architectural Heritage.

=== Library ===
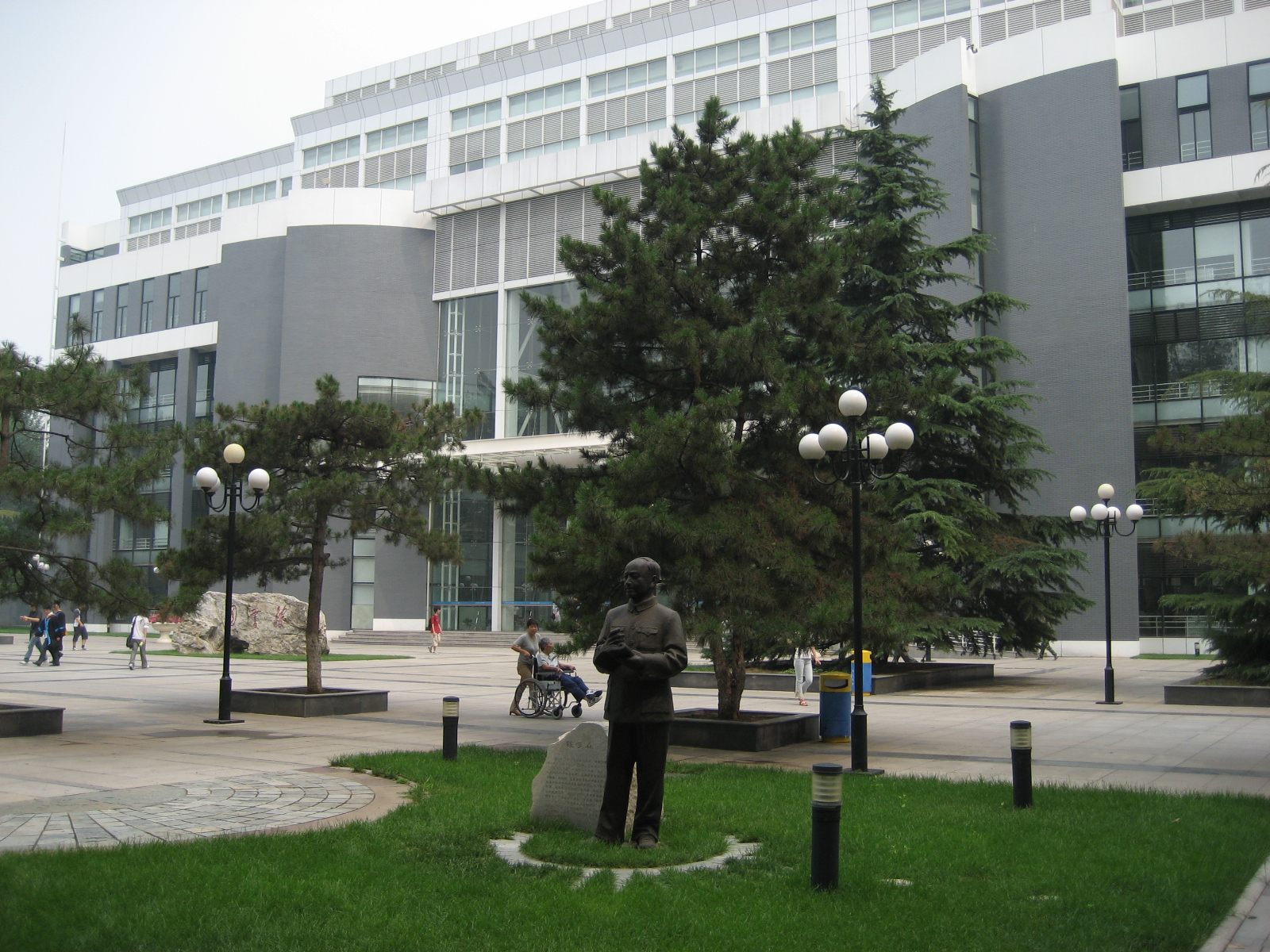
Beihang University Library

This university has one of the most equipped libraries in the field of aviation and astronautics in the world.

=== Hefei campus ===
Hefei Innovation Research Institute Beihang University Hefei Campus The campus is under construction by Beihang University and will also be Beihang's first campus outside of Beijing. The campus is located at Shaokan Lake (Laoguchong Reservoir) in Xinzhan Comprehensive Development Pilot Area, Yaohai District, Hefei City, North Anhui Province. The side with an area of about 2,500 hectares includes the Innovation Research Institute and the Undergraduate Faculty, which will be opened in 2018.

=== Qingdao Research Institute ===
The Qingdao Research Institute of Beihang University is the first research institute set up by Beihang University outside of Beijing. The institute is located in Laoshan District, Qingdao City, Shandong Province. Its postal address is No. 393 Songling Road, Laoshan District, Qingdao City, Shandong Province. Postal code 266104.

The area of the institute's park is 63,990.6 square meters, the total construction area is 102,794.05 square meters, the sports field is 3,600 square meters, including 2 basketball courts, 1 5-person soccer field, 1 volleyball court and 1 equipment field. There are 6 buildings in the park, building 1 is an apartment for teachers and experts, building 2 is a student apartment, the sixth and seventh floors of building 3 are virtual reality research institutes, and the second floor is building 4. The functional department office is Qingdao Bei Hong Research Institute. location; Building 5 is a comprehensive building for education, student cultural exchange activities and practical innovation; The fourth floor of Building 6 is the Institute of Instrumentation and Optoelectronics, the fifth floor is the Institute of Microelectronics, the sixth floor is the Institute of New Materials, and the seventh floor is the academic workstation. The institute was established on May 28, 2016, with Beihang University's State Key Laboratory of Virtual Reality Technology and Systems as its main scientific research strength. It was opened in 2017 and welcomed the first batch of graduate students.

=== Beihang University Stadium ===
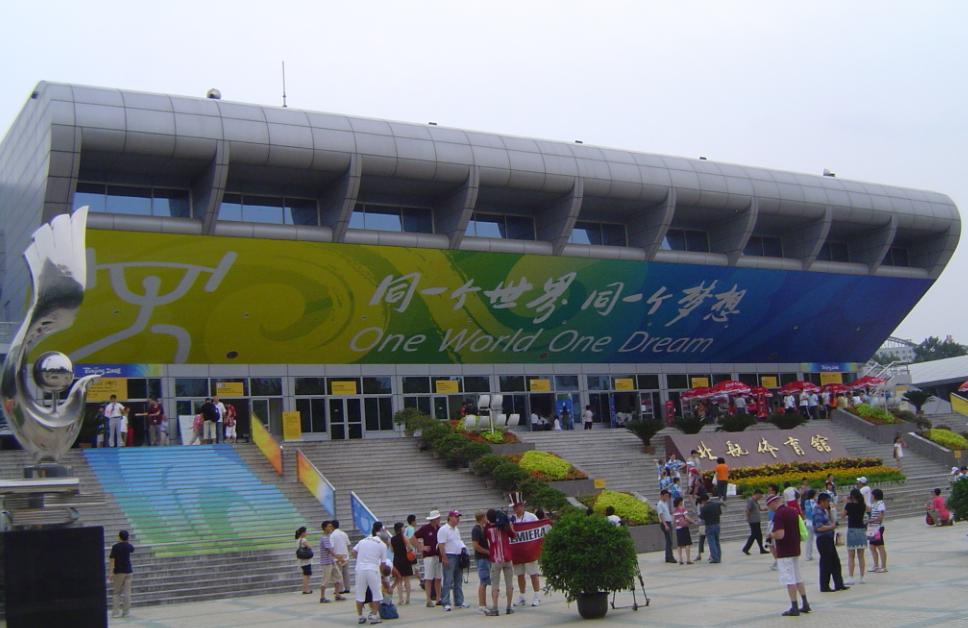
Beihang University Stadium, host of Olympic weightlifting competitions

In 2008, Beijing hosted the 29th Summer Olympics, and Beihang Stadium served as the venue for the weightlifting events.

=== Qingdao campus ===
Beihang University Qingdao Campus is a campus under construction of Beihang University located in Blue Valley, Qingdao City, Shandong Province. Covering a total area of 3,000 hectares, eight schools, including aerospace, materials science, smart manufacturing and microelectronics, are expected to welcome the first batch of new students in 2019.

=== Suzhou Innovation Research Institute ===
Suzhou Innovation Research Institute of Beihang University is a research institute under construction by Beihang University and may be developed into a campus in the future. The institute is located in High-Tech Zone, Hugui District, Suzhou City, Jiangsu Province, China. The contract was signed on November 22, 2017, and it will be opened in 2018 to get activated.

=== Chengdu Research Institute ===
Chengdu Research Institute of Beihang University is a research institute under construction by Beihang University. It is located in Chengdu Science City, Tianfu New District, Chengdu City, Sichuan Province. In addition, it has graduate training bases in cities It is also Pengzhou and Luzhou. To be opened in 2018.

=== Kunming Innovation Research Institute ===
The Kunming Innovation Research Institute of Beihang University is a research institute under construction by Beihang University and is located in Kunming, Yunnan Province. On November 22, 2017, Yunnan Province and Beihang University signed a cooperation agreement.

=== Hangzhou Innovation Institute ===
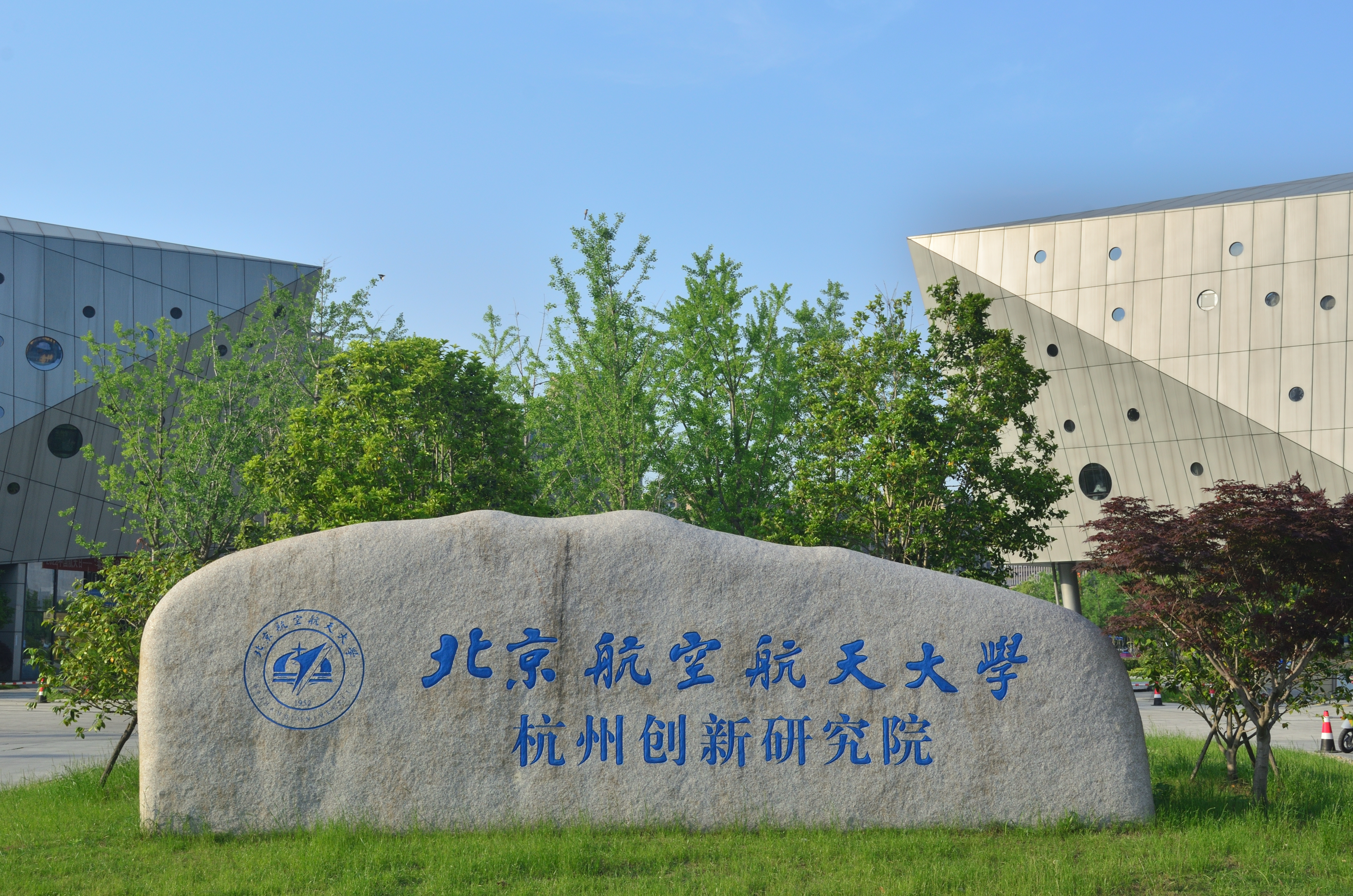
Entrance to Hangzhou Institute

Hangzhou Innovation Institute is one of the affiliated research institutes of Beihang University. It is located in Hi-Tech Zone, Binjiang District, Hangzhou City, Zhejiang Province.

=== Beihai College ===
Beihai College of Beihang University is an independent college of Beihang University. The college is jointly managed by Beihang University and the People's Government of Beihai Municipality. The college is located in Yinhai District, Beihai City, Guangxi Zhuang Autonomous Region. It was established in 2005 and registration was suspended in 2013. On August 25, 2017, the People's Government of Beihai Municipality conducted an organizational review at Beihang University Beihai College. Enrollment is expected to resume in 2018. Beihang University has a leading group for the administration of schools in Beihai, which is headed by the vice president.

== Management ==
=== Administrative affiliation ===
Beihang University has been affiliated to the First Ministry of Machinery Industry, the Third Ministry of Machinery, the Ministry of Aviation Industry, the Ministry of Aerospace Industries, the Science, Technology and National Defense Industries Commission since its establishment. Ministry of Science, Technology and Industry for National Defense, State Council and Ministry of Industry and Information Technology. These ministries are government departments that are directly related to the aerospace industry.

Today, Beihang is affiliated to the Ministry of Industry and Information Technology of the People's Republic of China, which is established at the level of the vice minister and is managed by the State Administration of National Defense Science, Technology and Industry. The People's Government is jointly built by the Ministry of Industry and Information Technology of the People's Republic of China, the Ministry of Education of the People's Republic of China, the Chinese Academy of Engineering and the Beijing Municipal Government.

=== Budget ===
Since its establishment, Beihang University's budget for running the school has been allocated directly from the national funds, and due to the special nature of the school's research path, it has not been cut off even in difficult national financial times. According to the "Compilation of Science and Technology Statistics in Colleges and Universities in 2017" published by the Ministry of Education on May 22, 2018, the science and technology budget of Beihang in 2016 reached 2.70124 billion yuan, with an average of 1.1668. million yuan per teaching and research staff. First rank in the country.

== University culture ==
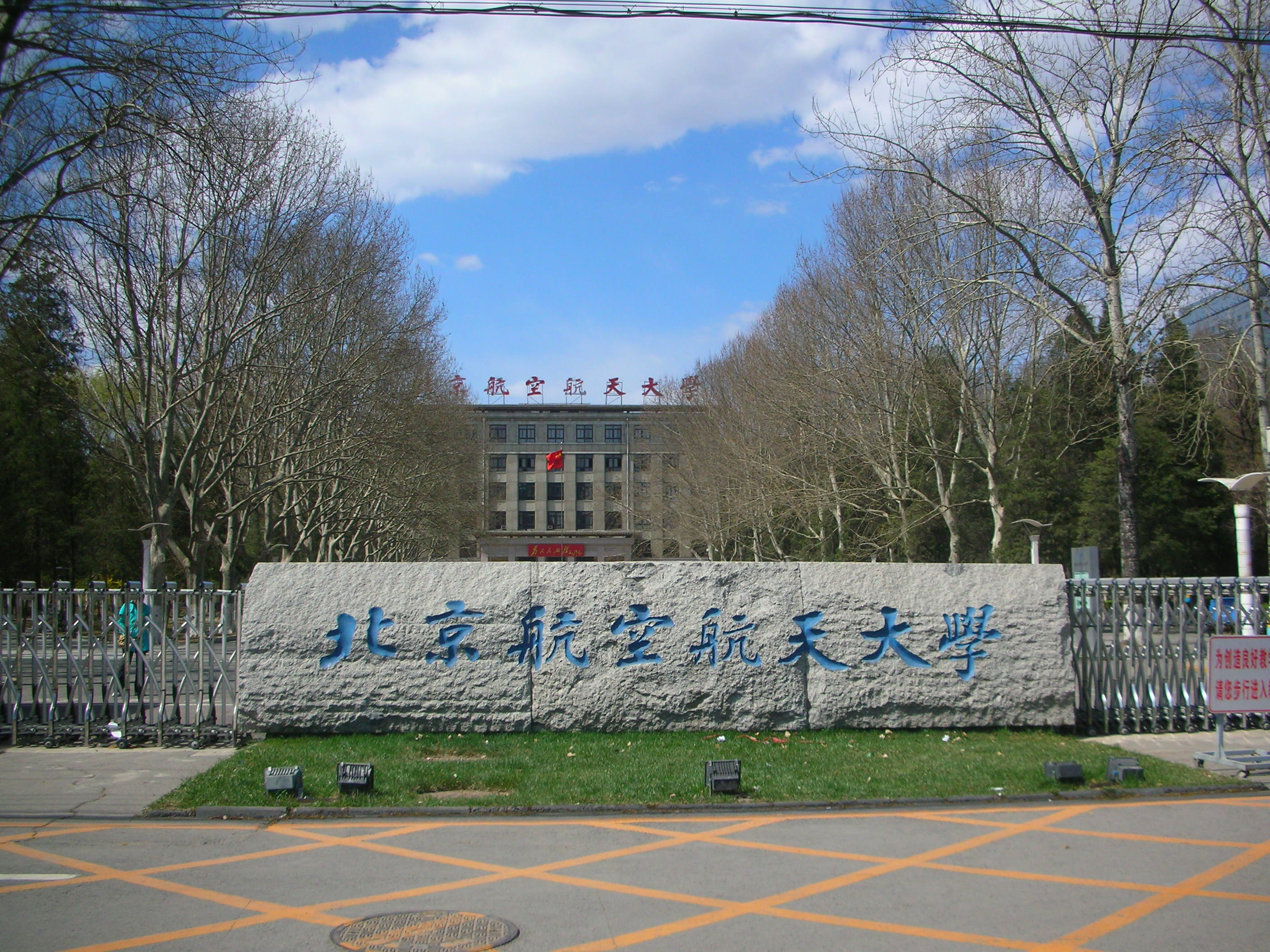
Chinese Calligraphy on the entrance gate of Beihang University

When Beijing University of Aeronautics and Astronautics was founded in 1952, it was named "Beijing Institute of Aeronautics and Astronautics", also known as "Beihang University". In 1988, the name of the faculty was changed to the current "Beijing University of Aeronautics and Astronautics" and its abbreviation was "Beihang University" and the English name of the faculty was "Beijing Aeronautics and Astronautics University" and English. It stood for "BUAA". In 2002, the English name of Beihang University was changed to today's "Beihang University" and the English abbreviation was still "BUAA". The current Chinese name of Beihang University was engraved by calligrapher Mr. Zhao Pochu in 1988 when Beihang University changed its name.

=== School emblem, school flag ===
The main body of the logo of Peking University School of Aeronautics and Astronautics is a concentric circle with two inner and outer layers, which is harmonious and natural, and is a symbol of the infinite and vast world, a unified yet uneven multi-level structure of time and space. Its main pattern, an upward double arrow (airplane), is an abstract image of an aerospace vehicle. Together with the opened book, the elliptical satellite orbit, and the twinkling constellations in space, they together form a spiritual culture recognized by it. Beihang University highlights the high-tech aerospace features of Beihang University.

The name of the Chinese school and the name of the English school carved by Mr. Zhao Pochu form a clear contrast system: the cultural concept of Chinese calligraphy represents the heritage and development of the long cultural tradition of the Chinese nation by Beihang; The name of the English school shows that in the new historical period, Beihang University's determination to move towards internationalization and modernization.

The main color of the logo is the school color "Blue Technology" (#01519A), which symbolizes a concept of openness, rigor, stability and entrepreneurial spirit, and the

unique characteristics of Beihang culture in aiming for the blue sky and having the courage to explore.

The Beihang flag, launched in 2002, appears to be blue with white letters (or white with blue letters) with the Beihang school logo on the top and the Beihang school name in Chinese and English on the bottom. . Several school flags have flown into space with Shenzhou 4 and Shenzhou 9 and were among the first "passengers" of the C919 airliner. There is less information about the school flag before 2002. According to video footage of Beijing's successful bid for the 2001 Olympic Games, the school's flag is shown in yellow characters on a red background, with the school's logo in the upper left. corner and the words "Beihang University" in the lower right corner (font unknown, but can still be found in Beihang University) (seen on nearby office buildings).

=== Official song ===
School Song On May 13, 2010, Beihang University announced "Looking at the Stars" as the school song [43]. The school song was composed by Liu Hui, and the lyrics were taken from the song "Looking Up at the Stars" by Van Premier at the time.

=== School spirit, school motto ===
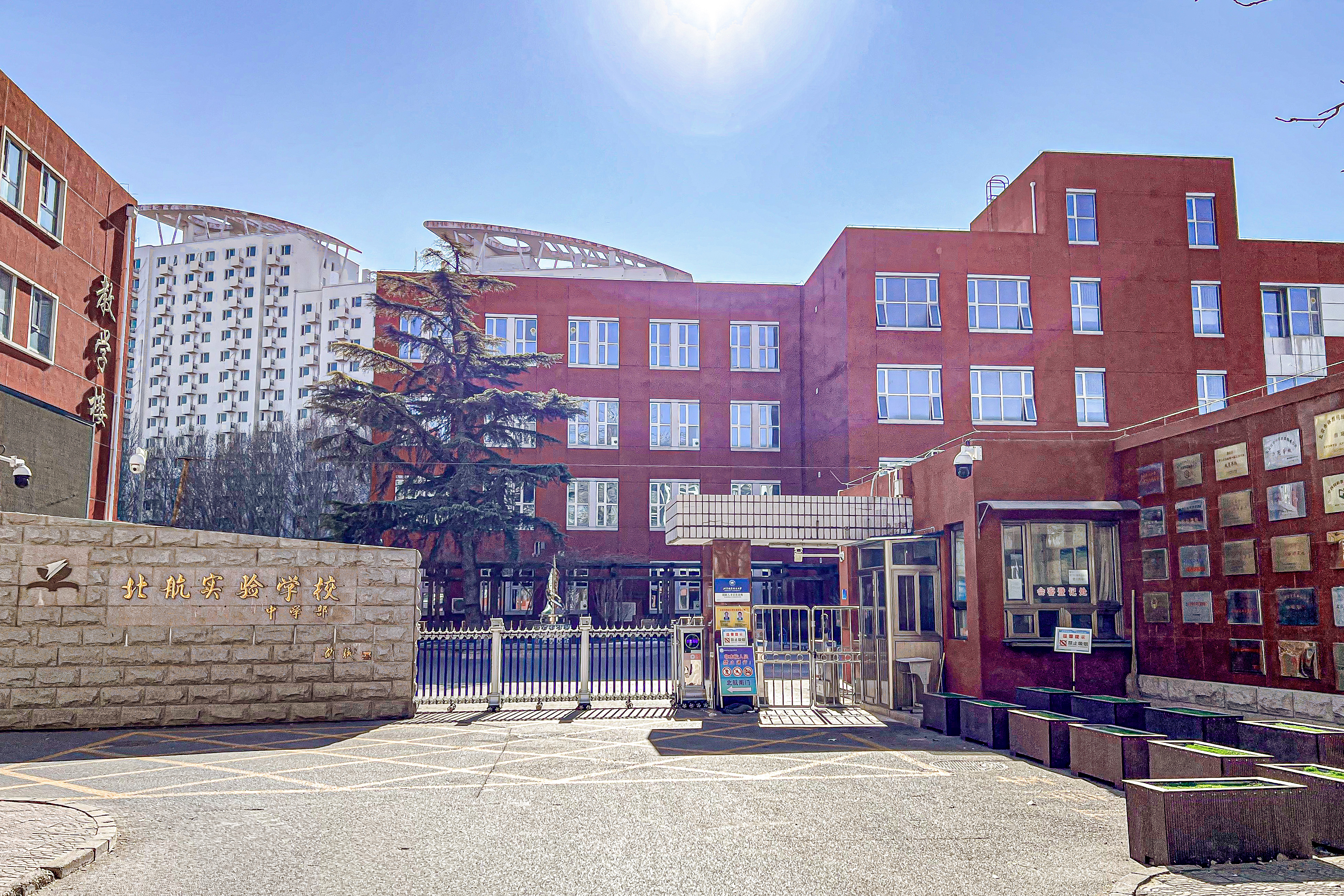
Experience School, Beihang University

The school spirit of Beihang University is "hard work and plain living, diligence, all-round development and bold innovation".

"Hard work and plain living" represents the idea of doing arduous pioneering work with both feet on the ground, more working and less talking; "diligence" is to study assiduously, love science and seek truth; "all-round development" embodies the possession of both virtue and brilliance, excellent character and academic performance, and the unity of knowing and doing; "bold innovation" represents the qualities of perseverance, being bold in exploration and being a pioneer with the goal of highest excellence.

The motto of Beihang University is "Integrate Virtue with Brilliance and Combine Knowledge with Practice", which is widely recognized by Beihang faculty and students as their code of conduct.

"Integrate Virtue with Brilliance" means excellence in both moral character and learning. The university highlights the importance of moral character, and character building precedes capability development in its talent cultivation process. It aims to cultivate talents for the Party and the country, aiming to achieve all-round development of character, intelligence, physical health, aesthetic taste and labour skills in its students. "Combine Knowledge with Practice" demands both the pursuit of truth in study and the courage to carry out ideas. Students are encouraged to put theories into practice and be devoted to learning, self-improvement and creation, applying what they learn to real-world problems. Students are encouraged to serve the country in the field of aeronautics and astronautics and be pioneers in national development. They are expected to meet national strategic needs and make contributions to the realization of the Chinese Dream of national rejuvenation.

Due to its outstanding contribution to the fight against poverty, the Bureau of Poverty Alleviation of Beihang University was awarded the "National Advanced Collection in the Fight against Poverty" at the National Poverty Alleviation Summary and Appreciation Conference on February 25, 2021.

=== School anniversary ===
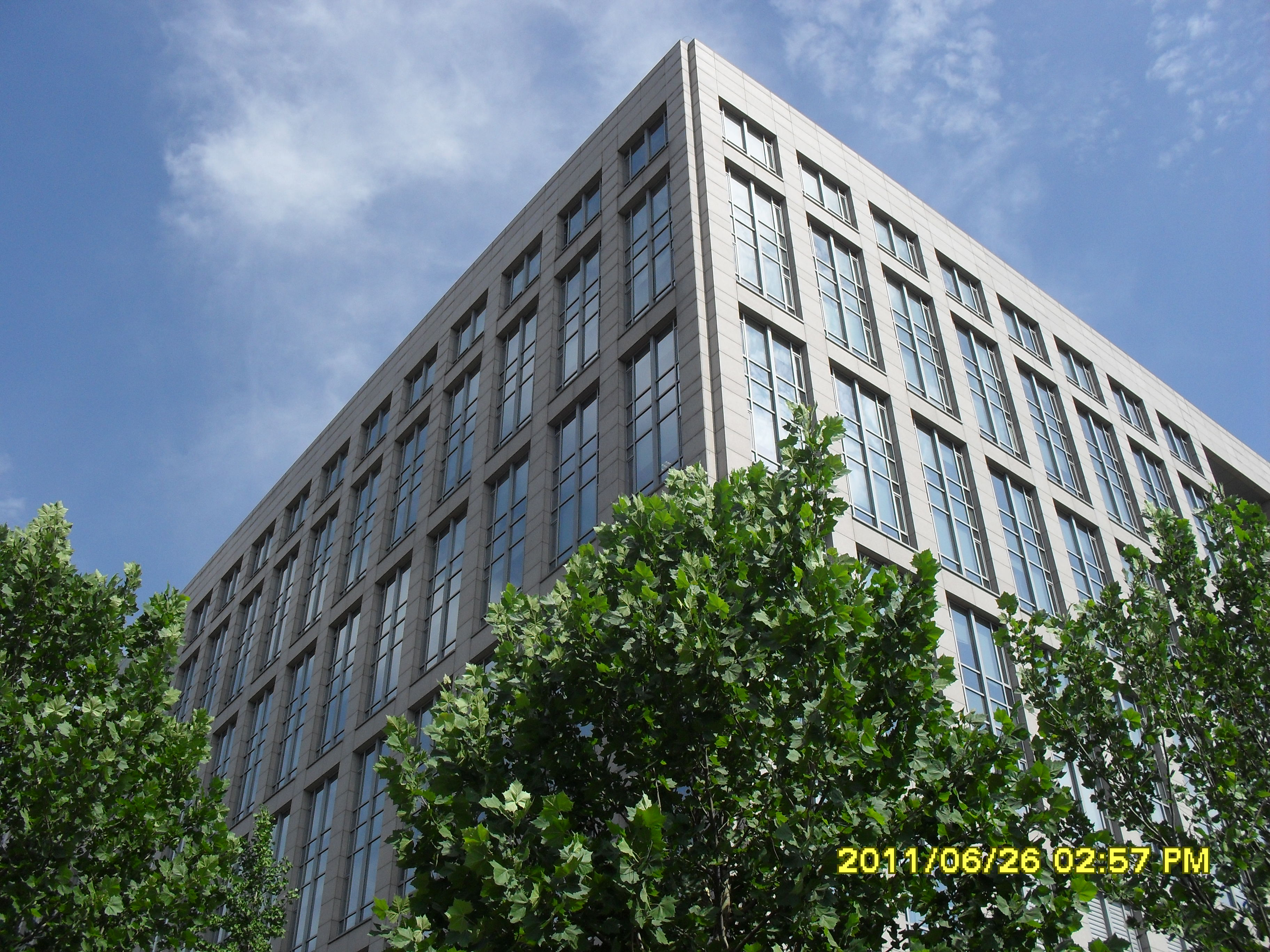
The corner of the new central building of Beihang University

The anniversary of Beihang University is October 25 every year because Beihang University was founded on this day in 1952. Since Beihang University does not have a separate holiday on the school anniversary day, Beihang students often hold a "campus anniversary carnival" on the anniversary weekend. At that time, faculties and student associations

== Notable alumni ==
=== Astronauts ===
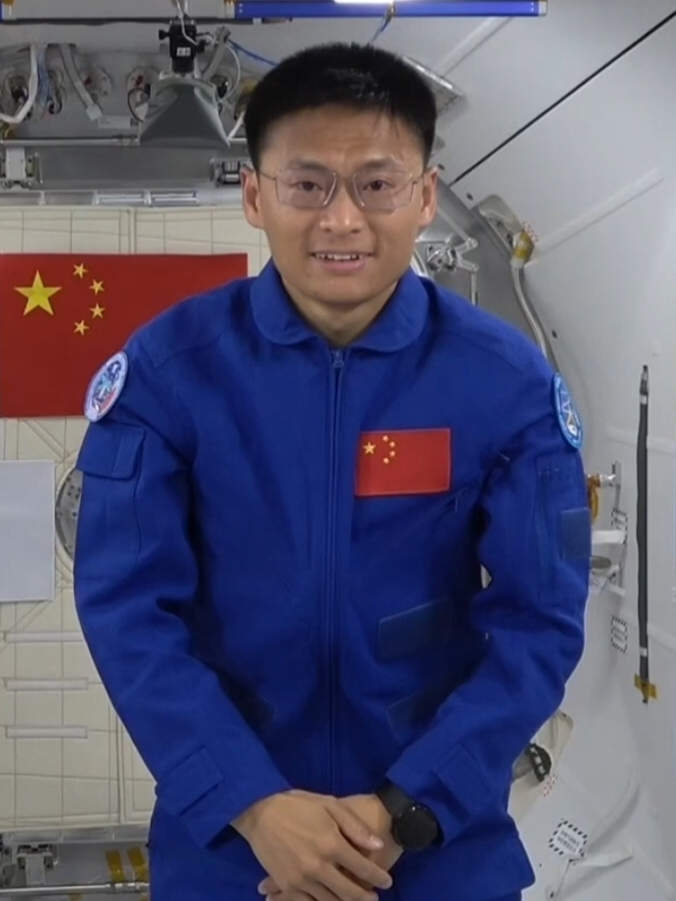
Gui Haichao, an astronaut who graduated from this university at the Tiangong Space Station

- Gui Haichao, Chinese academic and astronaut

=== Engineers ===
- Qi Faren, chief engineer of the Shenzhou program

=== Politicians ===
- Zhu Fenglian, spokesperson of the Taiwan Affairs Office
- Yuan Jiajun 袁家军, member of the 20th Politburo, former chief of the Shenzhou program
- Li Peiyao 李沛瑶, former vice chairman of the Standing Committee of the Chinese People's Political Consultative Conference
- Zhang Guoguang, former governor of Liaoning and Hubei

=== The military ===
- Yang Dongming, lieutenant general, former deputy commander of the PLA Air Force

=== Financier ===
- Jiang Bin, billionaire co-founder of GoerTek

=== Writer ===
- Xue Yiwei, Chinese writer resident in Montreal, Canada

== Aircraft projects ==
- Beijing 1
- BUAA Mifeng-6

== See also ==
- Beijing Air and Space Museum
