= Beijing Air and Space Museum =

Museum in Beijing, China

- 北京航空航天博物馆
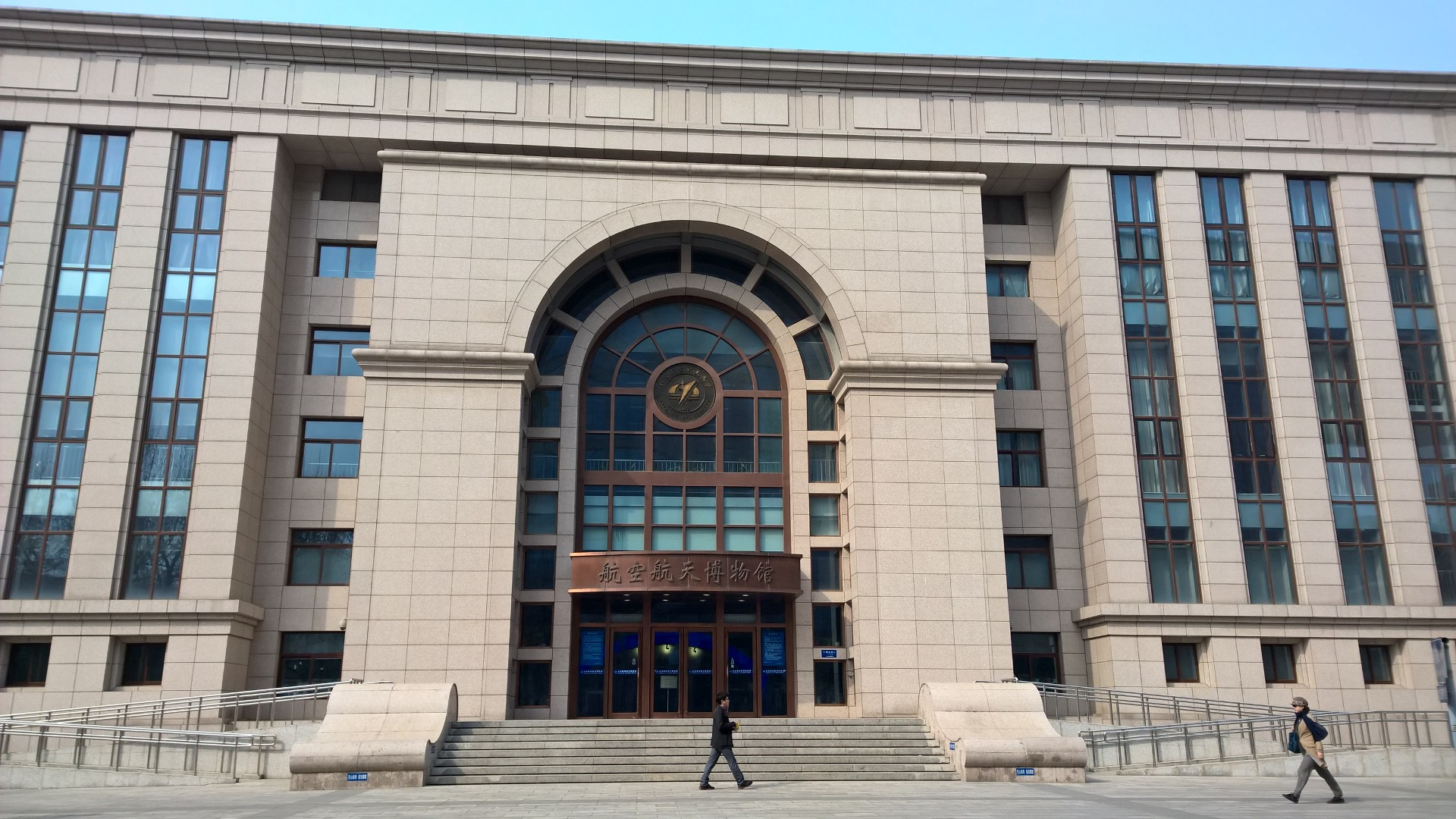
- Former name: Beijing Aviation Museum
- Established: 1985
- Location: Beijing, China
- Coordinates: 39.981903°N 116.350640°E
- Architect: Hetzel Design
- Website: airandspacemuseum.buaa.edu.cn

The Beijing Air and Space Museum is a museum in Haidian, Beijing, China. The museum is part of the Beihang University, one of China's most prestigious engineering schools. It was founded in 1985 under its original name the Beijing Aviation Museum. The museum has 8,300 square meters of exhibition area.

== Background ==
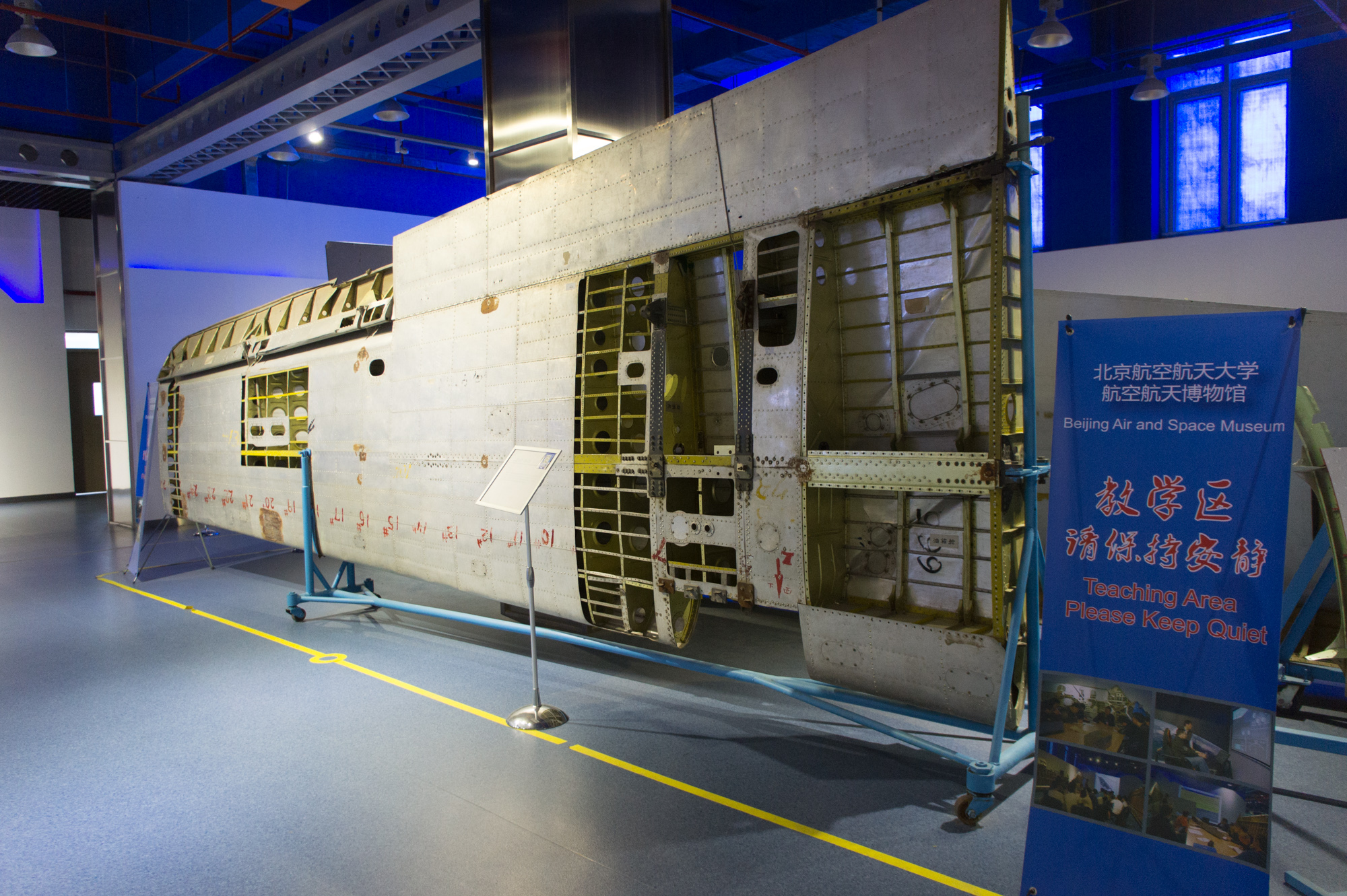
Aircraft wing with internal structure exposed and a sign reads "teaching area"

In 1985, the Beijing Aviation Museum was founded as part of the university of Aeronautics and Astronautics; in 1986, it was officially opened to the public. The mission of the museum is "to support the teaching and popularize the scientific and technical knowledge of aviation."

In 2002, the name of the school was changed to the Beihang University. The university is considered to be one of China's best engineering schools and is highly influential to the country's aeronautical and space industries.

After renovations in 2012, the museum reopened as the Beijing Air and Space Museum. This was the first aerospace science and technology museum built in China. The museum carries over 300 domestic and international aerospace items including plane structures, engines and equipment.

Because the museum is part of a university, many classes about aircraft structure, landing gears, missiles and other plane related topics are given there. The doors of the museum are generally open to its students but it is also open to the public through tours.

== Architecture ==
The building that houses the museum was designed by the architecture firm Hetzel Design.

It is called Futura City Beijing Air and Space Museum that also has 18 interactive exhibits, 3 theaters, children's astronaut training center and more. The 43,000 square meter building is part of the Futura City scheme which was the firm's idea that they should "break away from the standard city grid formation and introduce meandering boulevards leading to a large central park."

The problem the firm faced was connecting the parks to the building. They came up with the idea of a bridge, and after many renderings decided that the bridge should actually be part of the building. The bridge is a focal point of the buildings design as it looks like a plane taking off. Even before opening day the building drew crowds due to its design. The building won several awards.

== Exhibits ==
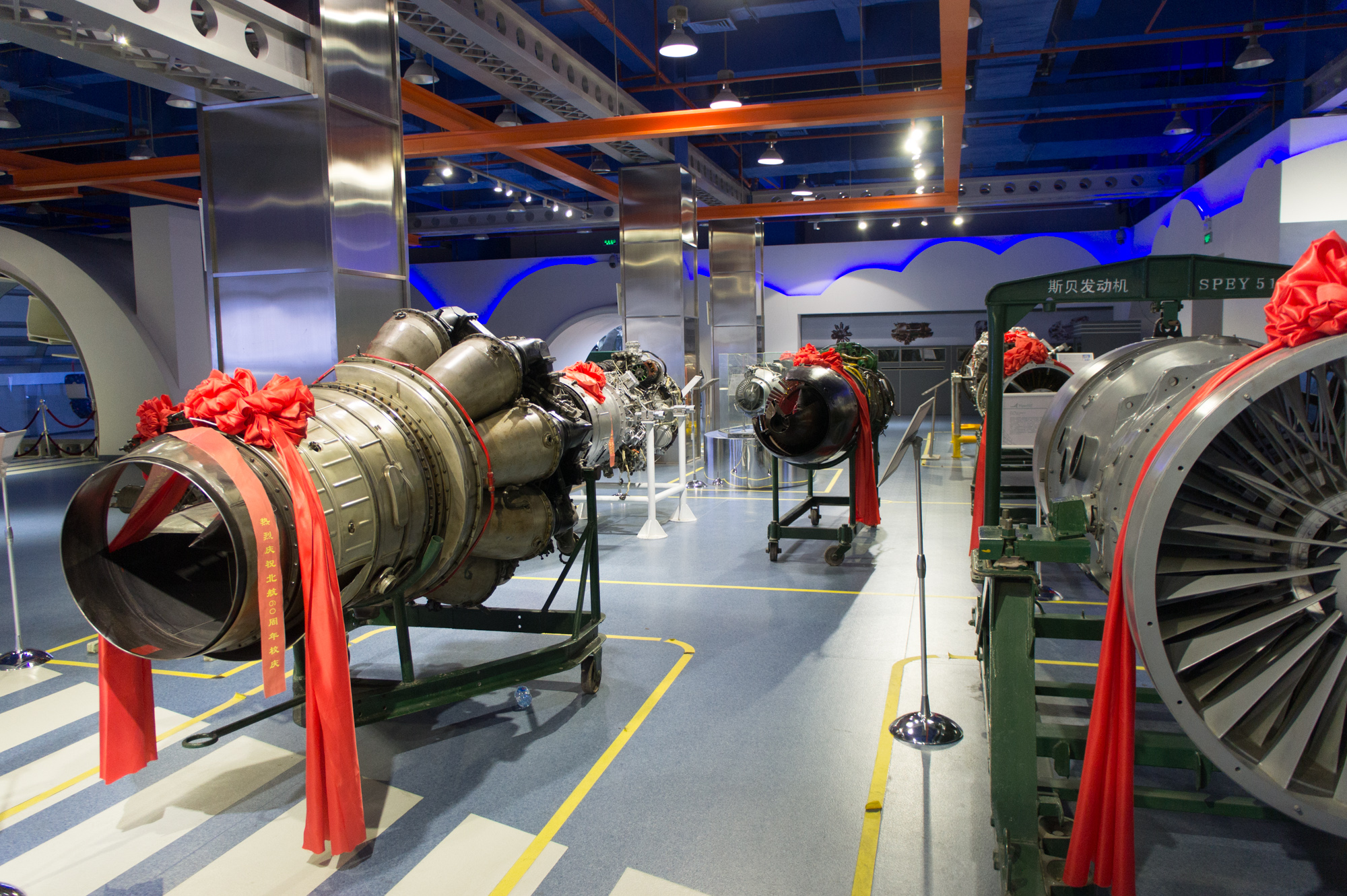
Aircraft engines on display

=== Dream of the Sky ===
The Dream of the Sky exhibit is divided into four areas: aviation design, aircraft engines, avionics and aerospace. At the core of the exhibit is a 3D cinema that uses large screens to present aerospace images. The exhibit is built so that visitors feel as if they are inside an actual plane. Not only do visitors feel like they are in a plane, but the exhibit is also decorated to make visitors seem like they are flying in the air. With the use of sound and light effects, the exhibit gives the visitors a full sensory experience. The showroom houses multiple parts of the airplane such as fuselage, wings, landing gear, engines and on-board equipment. The exhibit is interactive in many senses and because of this it is not only used for touring purposes but is also used for multiple courses in the university.

=== Silver Eagle Air Patrol ===
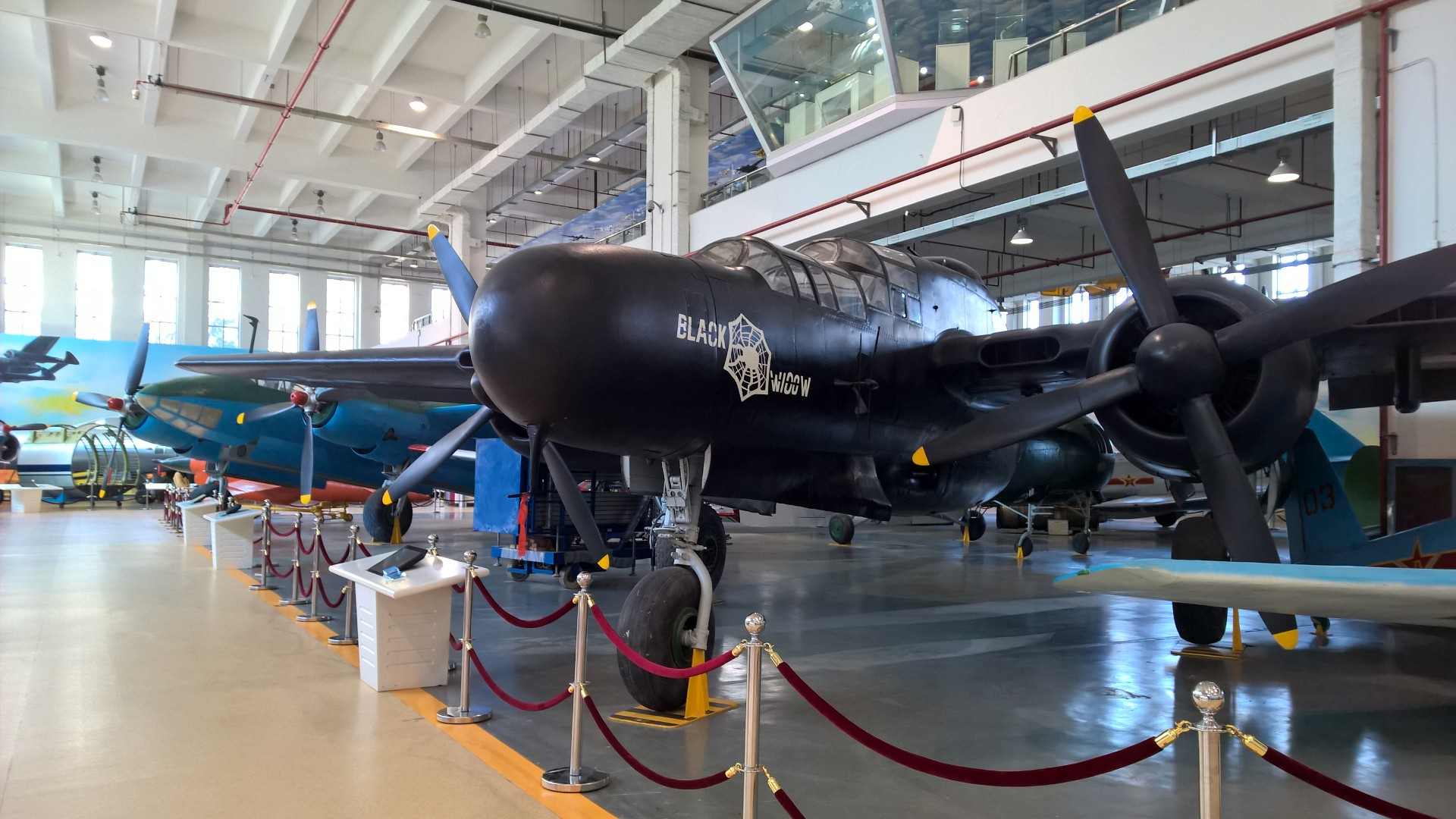
The P-61 Black Widow

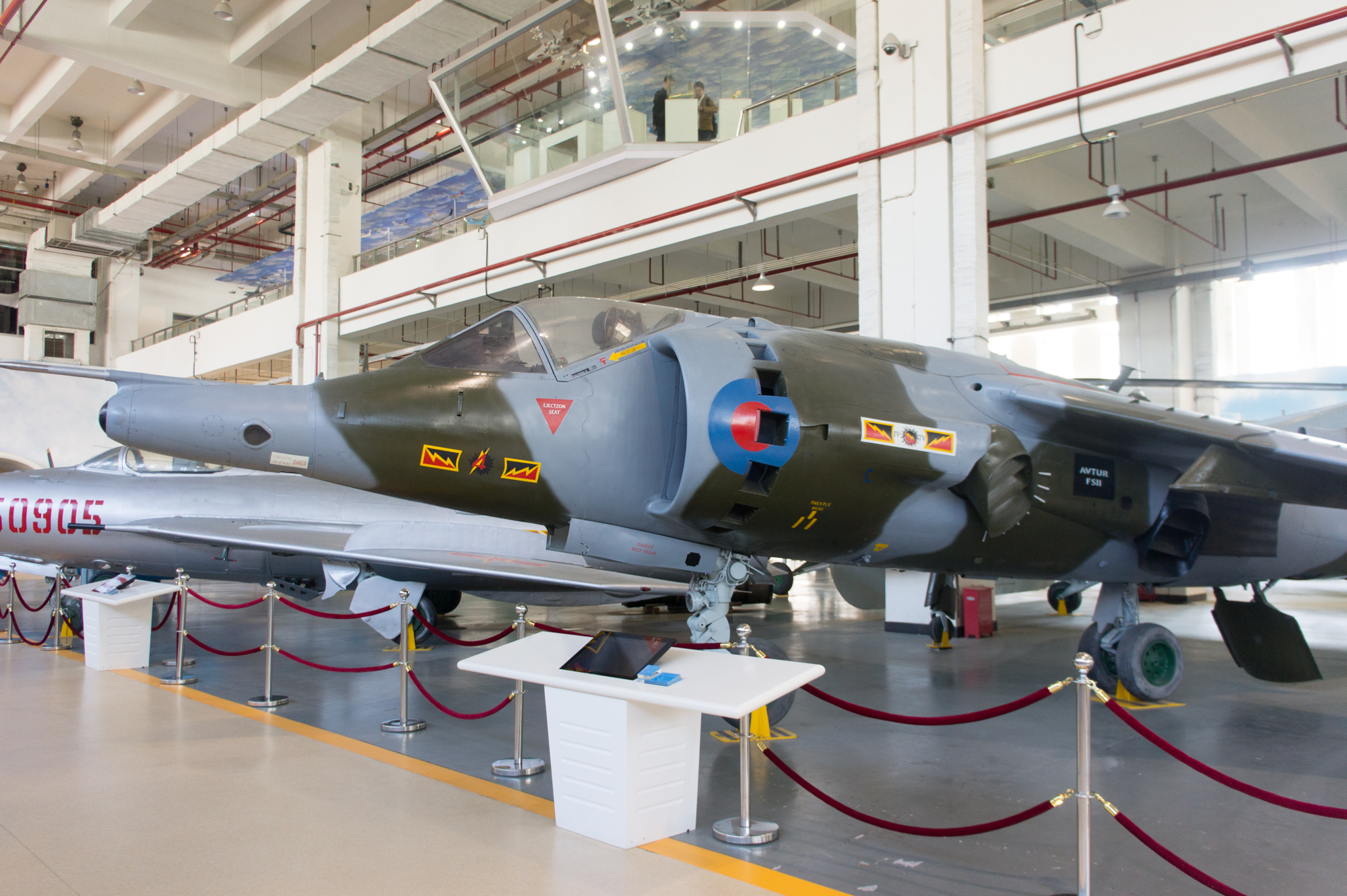
Harrier GR3

The Silver Eagle Air Patrol exhibit is split into two areas: Beihang Specialty Aircraft and Physical Aircraft Displays. The exhibit displays over 30 domestic and international aircraft. Some of these aircraft were designed and produced by the university itself. The exhibit is set up in a circular layout and is planned so that as one walks through they can see the evolution of aircraft over time. There are touchscreens that correspond to each plane that provides relevant background information so visitors can learn the technologies and stories behind each of these aircraft. Behind each aircraft is a painted panel that is themed to the plane to help create an immersive background.

==== Prominent exhibitions ====
- Northrop P-61 Black Widow, developed during World War II; the first operational U.S. warplane designed as a night fighter and the first aircraft designed to use radar; one of the four known surviving P-61s in the world and the only one outside United States.
- Hawker Siddeley Harrier GR3, a jet-powered attack aircraft capable of vertical/short takeoff and landing operations (V/STOL); obtained by exchanging with Imperial War Museum in 1996; the only Harrier in China.

=== Air Corridor ===
The Air-Day Corridor is divided into two sections: The History of Aviation Science and Technology and The History of Aviation Development. To add to the flow of the museum, the exhibit is spaced between the conclusion of the first and the start of the second floor of the museum. Suspended from the ceiling are a display of model planes that are perfectly coordinated in a line. These models help the visitors understand the evolution of planes and the advancements in aerospace exploration over time.

=== Shenzhou to Space ===
The Shenzhou Qiantang exhibit is divided into five sections: Rockets and Missiles, Satellites and Detectors, Manned Space, The Aerospace Interactive Area and a Student Work Area. The exhibit shows the dreams of space exploration and how they became a reality. The exhibit is filled with rockets, missiles, space suits, satellites, spacecraft, shuttles and other space related items from the past half century. There is a deep space background painting with celestial flowers so that visitors have the sense that they are in space.

== See also ==
- List of aerospace museums
