= China Association of Agricultural Science Societies =

Organization in Beijing, China

Established in 1917, the China Association of Agricultural Science Societies (CAASS, Chinese: 中国农学会), or Chinese Society of Agriculture is the oldest agricultural science and technology organization in China, serving as both a witness to and a proponent of the advancement of modern agricultural science and technology in the country.

This is a national academic organization co-directed by the Ministry of Agriculture and the China Association for Science and Technology, primarily tasked with advancing agricultural science and technology and fostering economic growth in agriculture and rural regions.

== History ==
=== Establishment ===
In January 1917, the pioneering Chinese agronomists who returned to China after studying overseas, including Wang Shunchen (Chinese: 王舜臣), Chen Rong (Chinese: 陈嵘), and Guo tanxian (Chinese: 过探先), established the Chinese Agricultural Society. In June 1917, the Jiangsu Province Education Association had its first conference in Shanghai, at which Zhang Jian (Chinese: 张謇) was chosen as honorary president and Chen Rong as president. From 1918 until 1947, the Chinese Agricultural Society had 26 annual meetings and published the "Chinese Agricultural Society Newspaper" in 1918.

=== Merge and Rebuild ===
In January 1950, the East China Financial Committee (Chinese: 华东区财经委员会), along with the China Agricultural Science Research Society (Chinese: 中国农业科学研究社), the New China Agricultural Society (Chinese: 新中国农学会), and several agricultural groups, organized the inaugural East China Agricultural Exhibition. In November, Beijing established the preparatory committee for the restoration of the agricultural society, which aimed to form the China Agricultural Society by incorporating members from the China Agricultural Science Research Society (Shanghai), Yan'an Agricultural Society, and other affiliated organizations. In April 1951, the Chinese Agricultural Society was rebranded as the China Association of Agricultural Science Societies with the endorsement of the Ministry of the Interior.

In October 1959, the organizations of animal husbandry and veterinary medicine, soil, agricultural machinery, plant diseases, insects, horticulture, and the agricultural water conservancy segment of the Water Conservancy Society were consolidated into the CAASS. In April 1978, the Ministry of Agriculture and Forestry, along with the Chinese Association for Science and Technology, submitted the Report of the Petition to the State Council on Strengthening the Organization and Establishment of the CAASS, which received approval from the State Council. The State Council and central leadership authorized and designated the CAASS as a public organization.

In July 1978, the third national congress of the CAASS convened in Taiyuan, Shanxi Province, where Yang Xiantong (Chinese: 杨显东) was re-elected as chairman of the board of directors for a third term. Subsequent to the summit, Yang guided 800 attendees to Dazhai; nevertheless, the agricultural conditions in Dazhai were profoundly unsatisfactory to all present agricultural specialists. Upon returning to Beijing, Yang established an agricultural meeting and articulated his aim to address the issue of the erroneous "Learn from Dazhai in agriculture", which garnered support from economists such Chen Hansheng. In the spring of 1979, Yang convened a speech at the 5th National Committee of the Chinese People's Political Consultative Conference to deny "Learn from Dazhai in agriculture", which emerged as a significant event of that year's conference. Subsequently, in September 1980, Vice Premier of China Chen Yonggui resigned, marking the conclusion of the "Learn from Dazhai in agriculture" debacle.

On December 12, 2017, a retrospective ceremony commemorating the centenary of the CAASS was conducted in Beijing. Wang Yang, a member of the Politburo Standing Committee of the Chinese Communist Party and Vice Premier of the State Council, participated in the retrospective event and made a speech. Xi Jinping, General Secretary of the Chinese Communist Party, dispatched a letter to commemorate the centenary of the CAASS, extending heartfelt greetings to all members of the Society and to the vast community of agricultural science and technology professionals.

== Leadership ==
First Session (March 1956)

- Chairman: Yang Xiandong
- Vice Chairman: Wu Juenong, Wang Shou, Jin Shanbao, Chen Fengtong
- Secretary General: Dai Song'en

Second session (February 1960)

- Chairman: Yang Xiandong
- Vice Chairman: Cheng Zhaoxuan, Jin Shanbao, Chen Shichang, Shen Qiyi
- Executive Director: Yu Tingzi, Wang Changsheng, Zhong Xingfan, Ren Bojiu, Lin Yifu, Qu Jian, Xi Fengzhou, Tang Chuan, Chen Yongkang, Chen Lingfeng, Gao Huimin, Xu Dudu, Xu Xilian, Cheng Shaozhuan, Xiong Yi, Zang Chengyao.
- Secretary General: Xi Fengzhou
- Deputy Secretary General: Chen Lingfeng

Third (July 1978)

- Chairman: Yang Xiandong
- Vice Chairman: He Kang, Jin Shanbao, Yu Dafu, Wu Juenong, Chen Shiqiang, Shen Qiyi, Cheng Shaozhuan, Li Qingkui, Zhang Xinyi, Ding Zhenlin, Li Peiwen, Zou Zhonglin, Chang Zizhong, Shen Juan
- Executive Directors: Ma Jueweng, Wang Gengsheng, Wang Zenong, Shi Shan, Zhu Lianqing, Zhong Xingfan, Zao Xingxian, Sun Zhongyi, Wu Jichang, He Guangwen, Chen Yongkang, Chen Huaji, Chen Lingfeng, Zhao Shanhuan, Lou Chenghou, Xu Guanren, Xu Dudu, Edward Liang, Tang Chuan, Tao Dinglai, Kang Di, Gao Huimin, Cui Xuan, Cheng Kansheng, Cheng Yiping, Zang Chengyao, Xiong Yi, Dai Songn
- Secretary-General: Sun Senfu
- Deputy Secretary-General: Yin Wannian

Fourth (May 1983)

- Honorary Presidents: Yang Xiandong, Jin Shanbao
- President: Lu Liangshu
- Vice Presidents: Ma Shijun, Fang Pingnong, Shi Shan, Sun Han, An Min, Zhu Xuanren, Chen Huaji, He Kang, Yang Feng
- Advisors: Ma Ling, Wang Gengsheng, Zhuang Wanfang, Sima Yi Asenov, Sun Senfu, Zhu Mingkai, Zhong Xingfan, Chen Ren, Chen Zhiping, Chen Yongkang, Chen Hongyou, Li Peiwen, Wu Juenong, Wu Jichang, He Guangwen, Zhang Xinyi, Zhang Dayong, Zhou Keyong, Zhou Yongzeng, Ke Xiangyin, Tang Chuan, Xu Dugu, Gao Huimin, Cui Xuan, Chang Zizhong, Cheng Kansheng, Cheng Shaozhuan, Cai Banghua
- Managing Directors: Ma Shijun, Ma Shiwei, Ma Defeng, Fang Pingnong, Shi Shan, Lu Liangshu, An Min, Xu Linghume, Xu Shijian, Zao Xingxian, Wu Xianzhi, Bu Yongbin, Liu Gengxue, Liu Zhicheng, Liu Jinxu, Liu Yuxiang, Sun Zhaoshan, Zhu Xuanren, Li Huaiyao, Chen Huaguyi, Chen Lingfeng, Shen Jun, Shen Qiyi, He Kang, Yang Feng, Xiang Chongyang, Gao Yiling, Xu Guanren, Tao Dinglai, Huang Zongdao, Qiu Weifan, Cai Ziwei and Cai Xu, Zang Chengyao
- Secretary-General: Li Huaiyao
- Deputy Secretary General: Pang Erdong, Li Junkai, Yang Xianzhang

Fifth (June 1987)

- Honorary Presidents: Du Runsheng, He Kang, Yang Xiandong, Jin Shanbao, Wu Juenong
- Honorary members: Ma Shijun, Fang Zhongda, Wang Zenong, Wang Shuxin, Shi Shan, He Guangwen, Liu Jinxu, Zhu Xuanren, Chen Ren, Chen Huaji, Chen Lingfeng, Li Junkai, Shen Qiyi, Zhang Xinyi, Zhang Jigao, He Shannwen, Gao Yiling, Ke Xiangyin, Tang Chuan, Zhang Wencai, Cheng Shaozhuan, Cai Ziwei
- President: Lu Liangshu
- Vice President: Fang Pingnong, Shi Yuanchun, Sun Jue, Xiang Chongyang, Zhou Yuzhen, Hu Hengjue, Gu Yulian, Huang Zongdao, Qian Ren
- Secretary General: Li Huaizhi
- Deputy Secretaries-General: Yang Xianzhang, Duan Xiuting, Wang Yongchang

Sixth (April 1992)

- Honorary Presidents: Du Runsheng, He Kang, Yang Xiandong, Jin Shanbao, Liu Zhongyi, Lu Liangshu
- Honorary members: Wang Qian, Wang Zenong, Fang Pingnong, Shi Shan, Ma Shijun, Zhu Pirong, An Min, Zhuang Qiaosheng, Wu Xianzhi, Sun Zhaosheng, Shen Jue, Shen Qiyi, Chen Ren, Chen Huaji, Chen Lingfeng, Li Huaiyao, Li Junkai, Zeng Xingxian, He Xiuyin, Xu Guanren, Qian Ren, Tang Chuan, Huang Zongdao, Zhang Wencai, Cheng Shaozhuan, Qiu Weifan, Zang Chengyao
- President: Hong Fuzeng
- Vice Presidents: Wang Lianzheng, Shi Yuanchun, Li Huaizhi, Liu Zhicheng, Mijiti-Nasr, Zhang Fengshan, Zhou Yuzhen, Luo Zejun, Xiang Chongyang, Hu Hengjue, Pei De'an
- Secretary-General: Li Huizhi
- Deputy Secretary-General: Duan Xiuting, Shen Qiuxing

Seventh (January 1997)

- Honorary Presidents: Yang Xiandong, Jin Shanbao, He Kang, Liu Zhongyi, Lu Liangshu, Liu Jiang
- President: Hong Fuzeng
- Vice President: Wang Lianzheng, Shi Zhicheng, Liu Zhicheng, Lu Feijie, Sun Xiang, Li Rite, Yang Xinhua, Zhou Xinyuan, Luo Zejun, Xiang Chongyang, Shu Huiguo
- Secretary General: Sun Xiang
- Deputy Secretary General: Shen Qiuxing, Jiang Ying, Li Kexin

Eighth (May 2002)

- Honorary Presidents: Du Qinglin, He Kang, Liu Zhongyi, Liu Jiang, Lu Liangshu, Hong Fuzeng
- Honorary Councilors: Wang Lianzheng, Xiang Chongyang, Lv Feijie, Fan Lian, Fang Pingnong, Liu Zhicheng, Shi Yuanchun, Ren Jizhou, Liu Gengxiao, Zhao Fazhen, Wang Maohua
- President: Zhang Baowen
- Vice President: Shu Huiguo, Yang Xinhua, Han Deqian, Zhai Huqu, Niu Dun, Chen Zhangliang, Fang Zhiyuan, Chen Jianhua, Li Rite, Pan Yingjie, Zhang Qifa, Yu Wei, Jiang Wenlan, Luo Shiming
- Secretary-General: Chen Jianhua
- Deputy Secretary-General: Li Kexin, Zou Ruicang

Ninth (June 2007)

- Honorary Presidents: Lu Liangshu, Hong Fuzeng, Zhang Baowen
- Honorary Councilors: Fang Pingnong, Wang Lianzheng, Shi Yuanchun, Ren Jizhou, Liu Zhicheng, Liu Gengxiao, Xiang Zhonghuai, Zhu Xioyan, Wu Changxin, Li Rite, Yang Xinhua, Wang Maohua, Fan Yunliu, Fan Lian, Nan Qingxian, Xiang Chongyang, Rong Tingzhao, Zhao Fazhen, Yuan Longping, Pan Yingjie
- President: Gu Chaoan (2007.6-2010.9), Zhang Taolin (2010.9-2012.12)
- Vice Presidents: Fang Zhiyuan, Wang Shoushen, Bai Jinming, Liu Yonghao, Liu Liren, Xu Rigan, Zhang Fengtong, Zhang Qifa, Li Jiayang, Yang Jun, Chen Zhangliang, Wu Wenbin, Zhao Fangtian, Luo Shiming, Ke Bingsheng, Liang Tiangeng, Liang Bin, Shu Huiguo, Han Deqian, Zhai Huqu, Teng Caiyuan
- Secretary-General: Zhao Fangtian (2008.5-2012), Yang Jun (2007.6-2008.5)

Tenth (December 2012)

- Honorary Presidents: Lu Liangshu, Hong Fuzeng, Zhang Baowen, Liu Chengguo
- Honorary Councilors: Fang Pingnong, Wang Lianzheng, Shi Yuanchun, Ren Jizhou, Liu Zhicheng, Liu Gengxiao, Xiang Zhonghuai, Zhu Xiuyan, Wu Changxin, Li Rite, Yang Xinhua, Wang Maohua, Fan Yunliu, Fan Lian, Nan Qingxian, Sang Chongyang, Rong Tingzhao, Zhao Fazhen, Yuan Longping, Pan Yingjie, Fang Zhiyuan, Bai Jingming, Li Jiayang, Liu Yonghao, Zhang Qifa, Wu Wenbin, Liang Tiangeng, Luo Shiming, Shu Huiguo, Han Deqian, Zhai Huqu
- President: Zhang Taolin
- Vice President: Deng Xiuxin, Xu Rigan, Liu Xu, Sun Qixin, Li Ning, Wu Kongming, Zhang Yaping, Zhou Guanghong, Zhao Fangtian, Ke Bingsheng, Tang Qisheng, Tang Ke, Yu Shuxun, Zeng Yichun
- Secretary-General: Zhao Fangtian

Eleventh (December 2017)

- President: Zhang Taolin
- Vice President: Wan Jianmin, Deng Xiuxin, Liu Xu, Sun Qixin, Wu Kongming, Shen Renfang, Chen Xiaoya, Zhou Guanghong, Hu Yiping, Yu Shuxun, Liao Xiyuan
- Secretary General: Hu Yiping
- Deputy Secretary General: Wu Jinyu, Mo Guanggang, Wang Jiayun
