= Yang Xiantong =

Chinese agricultural scientist

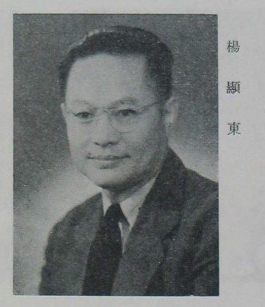
Yang Xiantong

Yang Xiandong (November 23, 1902 - October 20, 1998, Chinese: 杨显东), a native of Shinyang (now Xiantao), Hubei, was an agricultural scientist in the People's Republic of China.

== Biography ==
In 1923, Yang Xiantong was accepted into the Agricultural Department of Nanjing Jinling University with distinction, specializing in cotton and sericulture. In the summer of 1927, Yang Xiantong graduated from university and commenced teaching at the Henan Training College, established by General Feng Yuxiang. In 1928, Yang Xiantong was designated as a technician and interim director of the Hubei Provincial Cotton Experimentation Field. In 1934, with the support of Shi Qi and Li Fanyi, a prominent figure in Hubei, Yang enrolled at the Graduate School of Cornell University, focusing on the enhancement of cotton types. In 1937, Yang received a degree from the Cornell Graduate School of Agriculture. In 1937, Yang obtained his doctorate from Cornell University.

Following the onset of the Lugouqiao Incident on July 7, Yang returned to Peking and was designated as the commissioner of the Agricultural Adjustment Committee of the Military Commission and the director of verification for the provinces of Shaanxi, Henan, and Hubei. In 1937, Yang resided in Hubei and established contact with the Chinese Communist Party (CCP) under the leadership of Dong Biwu and Zhou Enlai.

In October 1937, Yang held the position of technician at the Hubei Provincial Construction Department and served as the director of the Provincial Cotton Industry Improvement Farm. Upon the establishment of the Grain Emergency Purchase and Storage Association in Shanghai by the Kuomintang, Yang was proposed for membership in the Association. He employed the Fusheng Fanzhuang governmental and commercial entities to amass substantial finances and resources for the New Fourth Army, earning the moniker "God of Wealth."

During the Chinese Civil War between the CCP and the Kuomintang-led Nationalist government, Yang dispatched a substantial quantity of food, medicine, equipment, clothes, and other military supplies to the Central Plains Liberation Zone under the guise of post-conflict aid. In 1948, Yang was reassigned from Wuhan to Shanghai as a special advisor to the Shanghai Emergency Grain Purchasing and Storage Association, and in May 1949, the CCP Central China Bureau (Chinese: 中共华中局) designated Yang as the dean of the Faculty of Agriculture at Wuhan University. In the autumn 1949, he was chosen as a representative of Central China to participate in the Chinese People's Political Consultative Conference and the Founding Ceremony of the People's Republic of China in Beijing, and was appointed by the State Council as the Vice Minister of the Ministry of Agriculture.

In 1951, a significant locust plague transpired in Hebei, Henan, Shandong, northern Anhui, northern Jiangsu, and Xinjiang. Yang Xiandong and other locust specialists traveled to other locations to coordinate locust management, and in 1956, Yang Xiandong became a member of the CCP, and ultimately attained significant success in eradicating the locust epidemic in China during the early 1960s. Yang advanced the progression of cotton-related scientific research and academic endeavors.

In July 1978, the third national congress of the CAASS convened in Taiyuan, Shanxi Province, where Yang was re-elected as chairman of the board of directors for a third term. Subsequent to the summit, Yang guided 800 attendees to Dazhai; nevertheless, the agricultural conditions in Dazhai were profoundly unsatisfactory to all present agricultural specialists. Upon returning to Beijing, Yang established an agricultural meeting and articulated his aim to address the issue of the erroneous "Learn from Dazhai in agriculture", which garnered support from economists such Chen Hansheng. In the spring of 1979, Yang convened a speech at the 5th National Committee of the Chinese People's Political Consultative Conference to deny "Learn from Dazhai in agriculture", which emerged as a significant event of that year's conference. Subsequently, in September 1980, Vice Premier of China Chen Yonggui resigned, marking the conclusion of the "Learn from Dazhai in agriculture" debacle.

On October 20, 1998, he died.

== Family ==
His father, Yang Jiekang (杨介康), served as the governor of Xinhui County. His uncle, Yang Huikang, was the acting governor of Hubei Province in the Republic of China government. Cousin Yang Chao and cousin Yang Gang were both journalists. Cousin niece Zheng Guangdi was the Vice Minister of the Ministry of Transportation of the People's Republic of China. His son, Yang Yuanxing, is the husband of Liu Yandong, Vice Premier of the State Council.
