= Ni Fake =

Chinese politician

- 倪发科

Vice-Governor of Anhui
- In office February 2008 – January 2013
- Governor: Wang Sanyun; Li Bin
- Preceded by: Tian Weiqian
- Succeeded by: Yang Zhenchao

Chairman of the Standing Committee of Lu'an Municipal People's Congress
- In office June 2003 – January 2008
- Preceded by: Hong Wenhu
- Succeeded by: Tang Linxiang

Communist Party Secretary of Lu'an
- In office November 2002 – January 2008
- Preceded by: Hong Wenhu
- Succeeded by: Tang Linxiang

Mayor of Lu'an
- In office March 2000 – June 2003
- Preceded by: New title
- Succeeded by: Ye Wencheng

Personal details
- Born: January 22, 1954 (age 72) Lishui County, Jiangsu, China
- Party: Chinese Communist Party (1973–2013, expelled)
- Education: Central Party School of the Chinese Communist Party

Ni Fake (simplified Chinese: 倪发科; traditional Chinese: 倪發科; pinyin: Ní Fākē; born January 22, 1954) is a former Chinese provincial politician who spent most of his career in Anhui Province. He took on leadership roles in the cities of Wuhu and Lu'an, before becoming Vice Governor of Anhui Province in 2008.

In June 2013, Ni was placed under investigation by the Communist Party's disciplinary body for corruption-related offenses; he was later removed from all his posts and expelled from the Communist Party. In February 2015, he was convicted of bribery and "amassing assets of unclear origin", and was sentenced to 17 years in prison. He was known for his enthusiasm for fine jade and owned a massive jade collection.

== Biography ==
Ni was born in Lishui County, Jiangsu province, near the provincial capital Nanjing, on January 22, 1954. During the Down to the Countryside Movement, he worked as a sent-down youth at Jianxin Farm, in Anhui Production and Construction Corps. He quickly emerged as a team leader among his peers on the production team.

Ni specialized in agriculture in his early career, becoming the leader of a local state-run farm production unit. He joined the Chinese Communist Party in January 1973. In 1983 he joined the provincial department in charge of overseeing state-run agricultural initiatives in Anhui province. He also took up studies on the side at the national school agricultural cadres and Nanjing Agricultural University. In 1987 he became deputy head of the department of agriculture in Wuhu, being promoted to head the department two years later.

He rose through the ranks to become the CPC Nanling County Committee Secretary in March 1992. In 1994, he was elevated to the Vice-Mayor of Wuhu and a Standing Committee member of the Wuhu Communist Party organization, and later became executive vice mayor. He served as the Deputy Party Secretary of Wuhu between December 1997 to October 1999.

Ni served as the Deputy Party Secretary and Mayor of Lu'an between 1999 and 2002. In November 2002, he was appointed the Party Secretary and Mayor of Lu'an, he remained in that position for five years, when he was elevated again to become the Vice-Governor of Anhui. During his term as Vice-Governor, Ni also served as an Honorary Chair of the provincial Jewelry Association.

Ni was a delegate to the 10th National People's Congress and a delegate to the 17th Party Congress.

== Corruption case ==
On June 4, 2013, state media announced that Ni was being investigated by the Central Commission for Discipline Inspection of the Chinese Communist Party for "serious violations of laws and regulations". The party investigation concluded that Ni had abused his power to seek benefit for others, taken "massive amounts" in bribes, and was "morally depraved". On September 30, 2013, he was expelled from the Chinese Communist Party, and sacked from all his government posts. He was formally arrested on October 17. His case was moved to judicial authorities for prosecution.

Ni's trial took place at the intermediate court in Dongying, Shandong province beginning in December 2014. The prosecution alleged that Ni received kickbacks such as luxury trips and renovations to his home in exchange for giving favourable treatment to a local entrepreneur; Ni was also said to be responsible for wasting some 1.9 billion yuan (~$307 million) in government resources. The prosecution referred to a large personal jade collection as evidence of Ni's corruption. The court found that Ni took bribes – in the form of cash, jade, and calligraphic works – on some 49 different occasions during his tenure as Vice Governor, worth the equivalent of 13.48 million yuan (~$2.15 million). He was also said to have taken bribes in the form of home furnishings, debts forgiven to his relatives, and retail cash cards. Moreover, some 5.8 million yuan ($930,000) of his assets were of unclear origin, which also constituted a criminal offense. In addition, it was established that Ni took kickbacks for lobbying for favorable policies for the executive of a local metals processing company.

Chinese media also reported that Ni himself claimed that he had always been a hardworking public servant and that he only became corrupt later in life as a result of becoming hopeless about gaining further promotion as he reached retirement age. Ni said he began taking bribes in order to "plan for retirement." He was quoted as saying, "for a few decades I was living for others, I wanted to live for myself for a change in the last years of my career." On February 28, 2015, Ni was sentenced to 17 years in prison. Ni stated he would not appeal the decision.

The Communist Party-run People's Daily wrote an editorial that compared Ni's obsession with jade with an ancient ruler from the 660s BC who diverted state treasury to fund his hobby of raising cranes. Ni also reportedly complained that he would not have committed the most egregious offenses had his superiors and party disciplinary authorities simply warned him about the nature of his conduct, implying essentially that he 'wouldn't have done it if he knew he would be caught.' Along this theme, several Chinese newspapers ran commentaries that rule of law and better enforcement of discipline were the best means to prevent corruption.

== Personal life ==
Ni is married to Xu Aiping (徐爱萍). Ni said he did not drink, smoke, or gamble, but had a weakness for fine jade.

Government offices
New title	Mayor of Lu'an; 2000–2003	Succeeded by Ye Wencheng
Preceded by Tian Weiqian	Vice-Governor of Anhui; 2008–2013	Succeeded by Yang Zhenchao
Party political offices
Preceded by Jing Yuankang	Communist Party Secretary of Nanling County; 1992–1994	Succeeded by Cheng Xiaosu
Preceded by Hong Wenhu	Communist Party Secretary of Lu'an; 2002–2008	Succeeded by Tang Linxiang
Assembly seats
Preceded by Hong Wenhu	Chairman of the Standing Committee of Lu'an Municipal People's Congress; 2003–2008	Succeeded by Tang Linxiang
