= Ahau =

Ahau or AHAU may refer to:

- Ajaw, a political rulership title from the Maya civilization
- Ahau, Fiji, the government station of Rotuma, a Fijian Dependency
- Ahau, Tonga, a town in the region of Tongatapu, some 10 mi (or 16 km) west of Nuku'alofa, the country's capital city
- Kinich Ahau, the 16th-century Yucatec name of the Maya sun god
- Anhui Agricultural University, a university on Anhui, China
