= Wang Maohua =

Chinese agricultural engineer

- 汪懋华
- Born: 11 November 1932; Xingning County, Guangdong, China
- Died: 28 February 2025 (aged 92); Beijing, China
- Education: China Agricultural University; Moscow State Agricultural College
- Scientific career
- Fields: Agriculture
- Workplaces: China Agricultural University

Chinese name
- Simplified Chinese: 汪懋华
- Traditional Chinese: 汪懋華
Transcriptions
Standard Mandarin
- Hanyu Pinyin: Wāng Màohuá

Wang Maohua (Chinese: 汪懋华; 11 November 1932 – 28 February 2025) was a Chinese agricultural engineer who was a professor at the China Agricultural University, a member of the China Association of Agricultural Science Societies, and an academician of the Chinese Academy of Engineering.

== Biography ==
Wang was born in Xingning County, Guangdong, on 11 November 1932. He attended Xingning County No.1 High School, where he studied alongside Wang Fosong. In 1951, he entered Beijing Agricultural Mechanization College (now China Agricultural University), and stayed to teach after graduation in 1956. He joined the Chinese Communist Party (CCP) in June 1956. In October 1958 he pursued advanced studies in the Soviet Union, earning vice-doctorate degree from Moscow State Agricultural College in 1962.

Wang returned to China in June 1962 and continued to teach at Beijing Agricultural Mechanization College (now School of Information and Electrical Engineering, Faculty of Engineering, China Agricultural University). In 1984, he was promoted to vice president of the Beijing University of Agricultural Engineering (now China Agricultural University), a position he held until 1990.

Wang died on 28 February 2025 in Beijing, at the age of 93.

== Honours and awards ==
- 1995 Member of the Chinese Academy of Engineering (CAE)
- 2007 Fellow of the International Eurasian Academy of Sciences (IEAS)
