= Lu Liangshu =

Chinese politician

Lu Liangshu (November 3, 1924 - January 4, 2017, Chinese: 卢良恕), originally from Huzhou, Zhejiang Province, and born in Shanghai, was a specialist in wheat breeding and cultivation, agricultural science and technology advancement, an academician of the Chinese Academy of Engineering, and the former president of the Chinese Academy of Agricultural Sciences.

== Biography ==
In September 1943, Lu Liangshu enrolled in the Department of Agronomy at Jinling University. In January 1947, upon completing his Bachelor's Degree, he commenced employment as a technician in the Department of Wheat Crops at the old Central Agricultural Experimental Research Institute, specializing on wheat genetic breeding until January 1952. In January 1952, he was designated as an assistant researcher in the Department of Grain Crops at the East China Agricultural Science Research Institute, a position he held until January 1965. In September 1953, he became a member of the Chinese Communist Party (CCP). In January 1965, he joined the Jiangsu Branch of the Chinese Academy of Agricultural Sciences, where he held the position of Director until January 1980. In 1970, he organized and led the establishment of the Taihu Lake Modernization Scientific Experimental Base. In January 1980, he became President of the Jiangsu Agricultural Science Center until January 1982, and in the same year, he also served as President of the Jiangsu Agricultural Society until January 1982. In January 1980, he assumed the presidency of the Agricultural Science Center of Jiangsu Province (until January 1982), concurrently becoming the president of the Agricultural Society of Jiangsu Province (until January 1982), and also the vice-chairman of the Science and Technology Association of Jiangsu Province (until January 1983).

In January 1982, he was appointed President of the Chinese Academy of Agricultural Sciences (CAAS) until January 1987. In May 1983, he assumed the presidency of the China Association of Agricultural Science Societies, a position he held until January 1995. In October 1984, he simultaneously served as President of the Graduate School of the Chinese Academy of Agricultural Sciences (CAAS) until April 1988. In December, he assumed the role of Chairman of the Second Academic Degree Evaluation Committee of the CAAS until March 1989. He served as the director of the National Advisory Committee on Food and Nutrition from January 1993 to January 2009. In 1994, he was chosen as an Academician of the Chinese Academy of Engineering, and in June, he assumed the role of Vice-President of the Chinese Academy of Engineering until January 1999. In 1998, he assumed the role of director of the Advisory Panel of Agricultural Experts at the Chinese Academy of Agriculture. By 2004, he led the team tasked with formulating China's food and nutrition policy for the 2011-2020 period, coinciding with the era of the Comprehensive Moderately Well-off Society and the Food and Nutrition Development Program for a moderately affluent society (Chinese: 全面小康社会时期的食物与营养发展纲要). In January 2005, he held the position of deputy director of the Expert Advisory Committee at the Ministry of Agriculture. From January 2009 to January 2017, he held the position of honorary director of the National Advisory Committee on Food and Nutrition.

Lu Liangshu died at the age of 93 on January 4, 2017, in Beijing.
