= Fang Xiping =

Chinese politician

- 方西屏

Communist Party Secretary of Huainan
- In office February 2013 – August 2014
- Preceded by: Yang Zhenchao
- Succeeded by: Shen Qiang

Director of Anhui Department of Commerce
- In office April 2011 – February 2013
- Succeeded by: Cao Yong

Mayor of Chizhou
- In office February 2006 – April 2011
- Preceded by: Xie Dexin
- Succeeded by: Zhao Xinqun

Personal details
- Born: October 1958 (age 67–68) Nanjing, Jiangsu, China
- Party: Chinese Communist Party (1982–2015; expelled)
- Relations: Fang Dongping (brother)
- Education: Fudan University; Anhui Agricultural University

Fang Xiping (Chinese: 方西屏; pinyin: Fāng Xīpíng; born October 1958) is a former Chinese politician who spent most of his career in Anhui province. Between 2013 and 2014 he served as the Party Secretary of Huainan; in 2014, he was put on trial for corruption and eventually expelled from the Chinese Communist Party (CCP).

Although Fang is an atheist and a member of the CCP, he was said to have believed in feng shui.

== Early life and education ==
Fang was born and raised in Nanjing, Jiangsu. He took part in rural manual labour between 1976 and 1978 as a sent-down youth; he graduated from Anhui Agricultural University in September 1982, majoring in agronomy, he obtained a Master of Business Economics degree from Fudan University.

== Career ==
He got involved in politics in September 1982 and joined the CCP in August 1982. From March 1987 to January 1988, he served as the Party Secretary of Dingyuan County.

Beginning in 1988, he served in several posts in Anhui Provincial Bureau of Land Management, including section chief, division head, and station agent. In November 1996, he became the deputy party secretary and county governor of Shucheng County, rising to Party Secretary in 1998.

In March 2000, he was appointed as deputy mayor of Lu'an, then he served as the deputy party secretary (February 2005 – February 2006). Fang then served as the deputy party secretary and mayor of Chizhou between February 2006 to April 2011.

In April 2011, he was appointed the party secretary and director of the Department of Commerce for the provincial government, he remained in that position until February 2013, when he was transferred to Huainan as the party secretary, replacing Yang Zhenchao.

== Downfall ==
On August 17, 2014, it was announced that Fang Xiping was undergoing investigation by the Central Commission for Discipline Inspection for "serious violations of laws and regulations".

On July 24, 2015, at the conclusion of the CCDI investigation, Fang was expelled from the CCP. He was accused of soliciting and taking bribes personally and through his family, and "maintaining mistress[es]". On October 18, he was indicted on suspicion of accepting bribes and abusing of power. On December 17, he stood trial at the Intermediate People's Court of Ma'anshan.

On July 22, 2016, he was sentenced to twelve years and six months and fined 3.25 million yuan. On August 23, his brother, Fang Dongping (方东屏), former director of the Internal Affairs and Judicial Work Committee of the Standing Committee of Hefei Municipal People's Congress, was sentenced to twelve years and fined 3.55 million yuan.

Government offices
Preceded by Xie Dexin	Mayor of Chizhou; 2006–2011	Succeeded by Zhao Xinqun
Party political offices
Preceded by Yang Zhenchao	Communist Party Secretary of Huainan; 2013–2014	Succeeded by Shen Qiang
