= Kong Xiaohong =

Chinese politician

- 孔晓宏

Deputy Secretary-General of the Anhui Provincial Committee of the Chinese People's Political Consultative Conference
- In office December 2022 – May 2023

Personal details
- Born: July 1966 (age 60) Lujiang County, Anhui, China
- Party: Chinese Communist Party
- Education: Anhui Agricultural University

Chinese name
- Simplified Chinese: 孔晓宏
- Traditional Chinese: 孔曉宏
Transcriptions
Standard Mandarin
- Hanyu Pinyin: Kǒng Xiǎohóng

Kong Xiaohong (Chinese: 孔晓宏; born July 1966) is a former Chinese politician who spent his entire career in his home-province Anhui. As of May 2023 he handed himself in to the anti-corruption agency of China. Previously he served as deputy secretary-general of the Anhui Provincial Committee of the Chinese People's Political Consultative Conference.

He is a representative of the 20th National Congress of the Chinese Communist Party.

== Early life and education ==
Kong was born in Lujiang County, Anhui, in July 1966. In 1982, he enrolled at Anhui Agricultural University, where he majored in agronomy. He joined the Chinese Communist Party (CCP) in July 1989.

== Career ==
After university in 1989, he was despatched to Anhui Provincial Planning Commission, where he worked for more than ten years. In August 2000, he was transferred to Bozhou and appointed director and party branch secretary of Bozhou Municipal Development Planning Commission. He was appointed vice mayor of Huaibei in November 2003 and in September 2006 was admitted to member of the CCP Huaibei Municipal Committee, the city's top authority. He was chosen as deputy director of Anhui Provincial Development and Reform Commission. In June 2013, he was transferred to Chuzhou and appointed deputy party secretary. He was made deputy party secretary of Huangshan in February 2015, concurrently serving as mayor since April of that same year. He also served as director of Mount Huangshan Scenic Area Management Committee. He became mayor of Xuancheng in September 2019, and then party secretary, the top political position in the city, beginning in May 2021. In December 2022, he was appointed deputy secretary-general of the Anhui Provincial Committee of the Chinese People's Political Consultative Conference, the provincial advisory body.

== Downfall ==
On 10 May 2023, he surrendered himself to the Central Commission for Discipline Inspection (CCDI), the party's internal disciplinary body, and the National Supervisory Commission, the highest anti-corruption agency of China.

Government offices
Preceded by Ren Zefeng	Mayor of Huangshan; 2015–2019	Succeeded by Sun Yong
Preceded by Zhang Dongyun	Mayor of Xuancheng; 2019–2021	Succeeded by He Chunkuan
Party political offices
Preceded by Tao Fangqi	Communist Party Secretary of Xuancheng; 2021–2022	Succeeded by Li Zhong
