= Zhang Shougong =

Chinese forestry scientist

- 张守攻

President of Chinese Academy of Forestry
- In office 2007 – November 2018
- Preceded by: Jiang Zehui
- Succeeded by: Liu Shirong

Personal details
- Born: 1 July 1957 (age 69) Huaiyuan County, Anhui, China
- Party: Chinese Communist Party
- Education: Anhui Agricultural University; Beijing Forestry University
- Scientific career
- Fields: Forestry
- Workplaces: Chinese Academy of Forestry

Chinese name
- Simplified Chinese: 张守攻
- Traditional Chinese: 張守攻
Transcriptions
Standard Mandarin
- Hanyu Pinyin: Zhāng Shǒugōng

Zhang Shougong (born 1 July 1957) is a Chinese forestry engineer and academician of the Chinese Academy of Engineering, formerly served as president of Chinese Academy of Forestry from 2007 to 2018.

== Biography ==
Zhang was born in Huaiyuan County, Anhui, on 1 July 1957. He holds a bachelor's degree from Anhui Agricultural University, and master's and doctor's degrees from Beijing Forestry University, all in forestry.

He was dispatched to the Chinese Academy of Forestry in 1990, becoming vice president in 1997 and president in 2008. On 24 February 2018, he became a delegate to the 13th National People's Congress. In March 2018, he was appointed vice chairperson of the National People's Congress Environment Protection and Resources Conservation Committee.

He was a delegate of the 17th National Congress of the Chinese Communist Party.

== Honors and awards ==
- 2001 State Science and Technology Progress Award (Second Class)
- 2002 State Science and Technology Progress Award (Second Class)
- 2010 State Science and Technology Progress Award (Second Class)
- 27 November 2017 Member of the Chinese Academy of Engineering (CAE)

Academic offices
Preceded by Jiang Zehui	President of Chinese Academy of Forestry; 2007–2018	Succeeded by Liu Shirong
