= Zengjian J. Chen =

Zengjian Jeffrey Chen is a Chinese American plant biologist and molecular geneticist. He is the D. J. Sibley Centennial Professor of Plant Molecular Genetics at University of Texas at Austin. His research focuses on gene expression regulation in plant hybrids and polyploids and cotton genomics. Chen received his B.S. at Zhejiang Agricultural University (now Zhejiang University), M.S. at Nanjing Agricultural University, and Ph.D. in Genetics at Texas A&M University. Following a postdoctoral position at University of Minnesota and as an NIH Postdoctoral Fellow at Washington University in St. Louis, he joined the faculty at Texas A&M in 1999, where he was promoted to the rank of associate professor with tenure. In 2005, he moved to The University of Texas at Austin and became a full professor in 2008 in the Departments of Molecular Biosciences and Integrative Biology, Center for Computational Biology and Bioinformatics, and Institute for Cellular and Molecular Biology.

Chen is known for his pioneering work on defining genomic and epigenetic changes in plant hybrids and polyploids with an emphasis on associating gene expression variation with phenotypic traits using Arabidopsis, cotton, and corn as experimental systems. He and his colleagues have discovered that epigenetic mechanisms drive genome-wide nonadditive expression of the genes in different regulatory pathways, including circadian clock genes that promote growth vigor, transcription factor genes that control fiber cell development, and genes and small RNAs that mediate seed size. Chen has led an international effort to sequence the tetraploid genome of Upland cotton that accounts for 90% of the cotton produced worldwide, providing a unique resource for cotton improvement using breeding and biotechnology. His research findings have significant implications, not only for advancing the field of genetics and epigenetics, but also for successful applications of biotechnology to safely and effectively manipulate gene expression associated with growth vigor in plants and crops that produce food, feed, and biomaterials. Chen is an elected fellow of American Association for the Advancement of Science (AAAS) (2011) and American Society of Plant Biologists (ASPB) (2023), and has received NIH National Research Service Award (1997-1999), Fulbright US-UK Scholar Award (2011), and Cotton Biotechnology Award (2016).
