= Yu Shuxun =

- 喻树迅
- Born: 1 November 1953; Macheng County, Hubei, China
- Died: 7 September 2025 (aged 71); Hainan, China
- Education: Huazhong Agricultural University; Northwest A&F University
- Scientific career
- Fields: Cotton genetic breeding
- Workplaces: Cotton Research Institute, Chinese Academy of Agricultural Sciences; Zhejiang A&F University

Chinese name
- Simplified Chinese: 喻树迅
- Traditional Chinese: 喻樹迅
Transcriptions
Standard Mandarin
- Hanyu Pinyin: Yù Shùxùn

Yu Shuxun (Chinese: 喻树迅; 1 November 1953 – 7 September 2025) was a Chinese cotton genetic breeder who served as director of the Cotton Research Institute, Chinese Academy of Agricultural Sciences from 2001 to 2013, a former president of the China Cotton Association, and an academician of the Chinese Academy of Engineering.

== Biography ==
Yu was born into a peasant family in Macheng County (now Macheng), Hubei, on 1 November 1953. He joined the Chinese Communist Party (CCP) in April 1972. In 1976, after the end of the Cultural Revolution, he was accepted to Huazhong Agricultural College (now Huazhong Agricultural University), where he majored in agronomy. He obtained his doctor's degree from Northwest A&F University in 2003.

Starting in July 1989, Yu served in several posts in the Cotton Research Institute, Chinese Academy of Agricultural Sciences, including deputy director, deputy division director, and assistant director. He moved up the ranks to become director in July 2001, and served until January 2013. In 2016, he was recruited as a doctoral supervisor of Zhejiang A&F University.

On 7 September 2025, Yu died in Hainan, at the age of 71.

== Honours and awards ==
- 1995 State Science and Technology Progress Award (First Class) for a new cotton variety suitable for wheat-cotton double cropping and summer intercropping - Zhongmiansuo 16
- 1999 State Science and Technology Progress Award (Second Class) for a new low-phenol cotton variety suitable for wheat-cotton double cropping and summer intercropping - Zhongmiansuo 20
- 2004 State Science and Technology Progress Award (Second Class) for biochemical assisted breeding technology has been used to select high-quality, multi-resistant, and high-yielding new varieties - Zhongmiansuo 24, 27, and 36
- 2010 Science and Technology Progress Award of the Ho Leung Ho Lee Foundation
- 2011 Member of the Chinese Academy of Engineering (CAE)

Academic offices
Preceded by Xia Jingyuan (夏敬源)	President of the China Cotton Association; 2001–2011	Succeeded by ?
