= Li Jiayang =

Chinese agronomist, Vice Minister of Agriculture (born 1956)

- 李家洋; ForMemRS
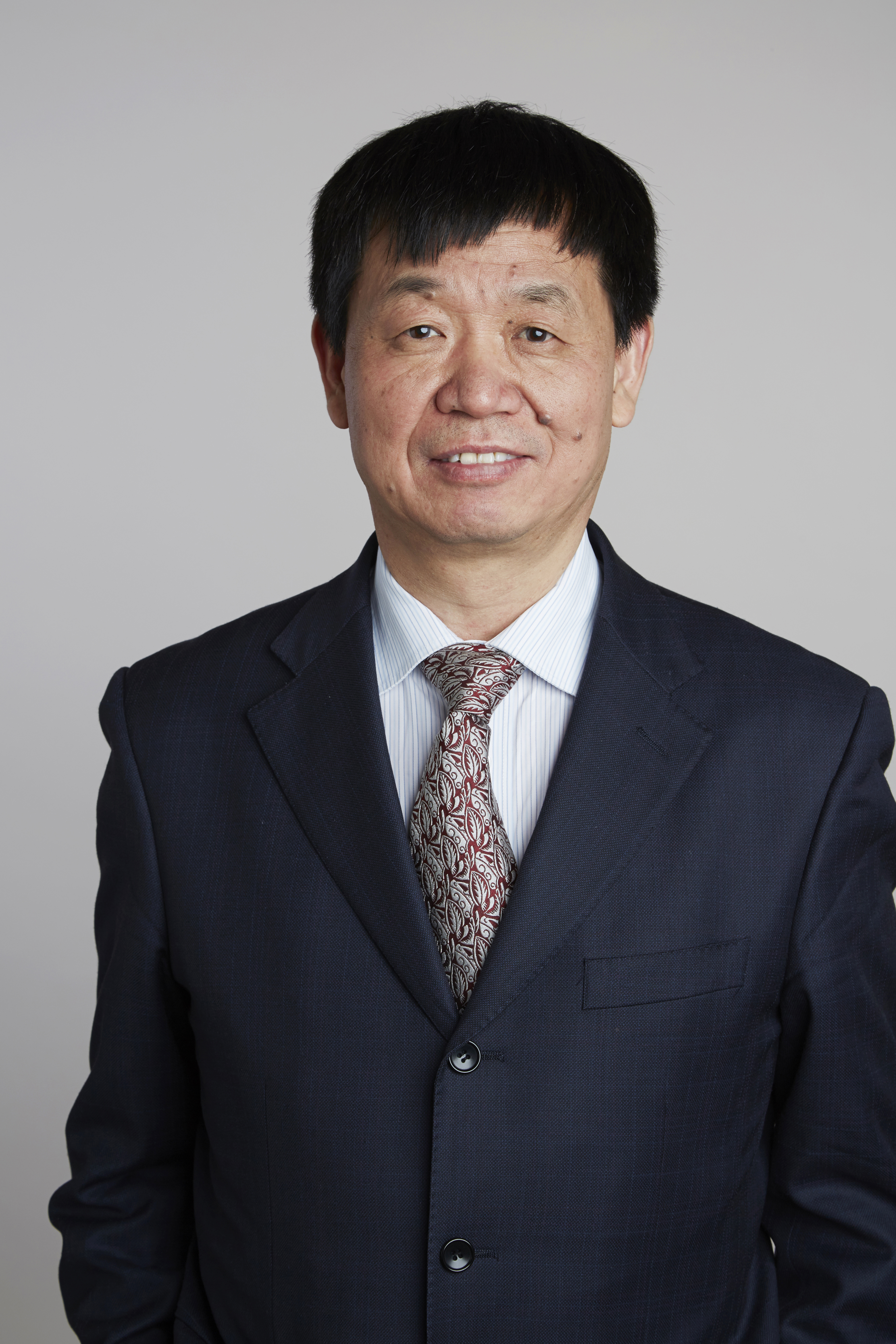
- Li Jiayang in 2015
- Born: 1956 (age 69–70); Anhui, China
- Education: Anhui Agricultural University; Brandeis University (PhD)
- Awards: ForMemRS (2015); Foreign Associate of National Academy of Sciences (2011); Fellow of TWAS; Ho Leung Ho Lee Foundation award for Life Sciences
- Scientific career
- Fields: Rice; Genetics; Genomics; Plant breeding; Plant Sciences
- Workplaces: Cornell University; University of Leeds; Chinese Academy of Sciences
- Thesis: Purification and properties of ATP sulfurylase and adenosine 5'-phosphosulfate sulfotransferase from Euglena (1991)
- Doctoral advisor: Jerome A. Schiff
- Website: sourcedb.cas.cn/sourcedb_genetics_cas/yw/zjrc/cm/200907/t20090721_2130992.html

Li Jiayang ForMemRS (Chinese: 李家洋; born 1956) is a Chinese agronomist and geneticist. He is Vice Minister of Agriculture in China and President of the Chinese Academy of Agricultural Sciences (CAAS). He is also Professor and Principal investigator at the Institute of Genetics and Development at the Chinese Academy of Sciences (CAS).

== Education ==
Li was educated at Anhui Agricultural University in China where he was award a Bachelor's degree in Agronomy in 1982. He continued his education in the United States where he was awarded a PhD in 1991 from Brandeis University for his research into the enzymes involved in the reduction of sulfate (ATP sulfurylase and adenosine 5'-phosphosulfate sulfotransferase) in the single-celled organism Euglena.

== Career ==
Following his PhD, Li completed postdoctoral research with Robert L. Last at Cornell University. He has been Professor of plant molecular genetics at the Institute of Genetics, Chinese Academy of Sciences since 1994.

== Awards and honours ==
Li was elected a Foreign Member of the Royal Society (ForMemRS) in 2015. His nomination reads:

Professor Jiayang Li has made seminal contributions to establishing forward genetics approaches in rice and in using them to understand rice growth habit. He has identified and characterized key transcription factors and hormonal signals that determine rice architecture, and he has demonstrated that this fundamental knowledge can contribute to the development of improved rice varieties through marker assisted breeding.

Li was also elected a Member of the Chinese Academy of Sciences (CAS) in 2001, a Fellow of the Third World Academy of Sciences (TWAS) in 2004, a Foreign Associate of the National Academy of Sciences (NAS) of the US in 2011, a Member of the German Academy of Sciences Leopoldina in 2012, and a Foreign Member of the European Molecular Biology Organization (EMBO) in 2013. In both 2016 and 2019, he became a laureate of the Asian Scientist 100 by the Asian Scientist.
