= Xiang Jutan =

Chinese politician

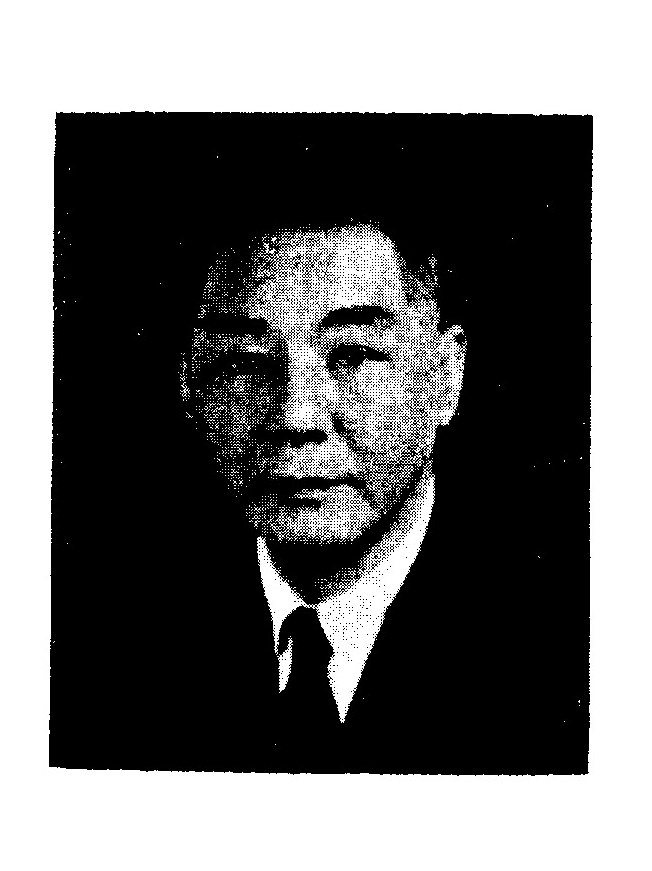
Xiang Jutan

Xiang Jutan (November 14, 1889 - June 6, 1970, Chinese: 相菊潭), also known as Shouqi, was a male politician from Baoying, Jiangsu Province, during the Republic of China era. He has a son Xiang Chongyang.

Xiang obtained a degree from the National Nanjing Higher Teacher's College and held the position of professor at the Soochow-Hujiang Joint School of Law and Business. On September 9, 1931, he was designated as the section chief of the Education Department of the Shandong Provincial Government. On September 10, 1931, he was designated as inspector of the Ministry of Education of the Republic of China. On September 3, 1934, he was designated as the section chief of the Education Department of the Jiangsu Provincial Government. On March 19, 1936, he was designated as the secretary of the Civil Affairs Department of the Jiangsu Provincial Government. On March 19, 1941, he was designated as a councillor in the Ministry of Education. He resigned on May 19, 1948. Subsequently, he assumed the role of acting principal at the Third Middle School in Jiangsu Province. He died on June 6, 1970.
