= Zhao Fazhen =

Chinese aquaculturist (1935–2025)

- 赵法箴
- Born: 13 May 1935; Ye County, Shandong, China
- Died: 26 February 2025 (aged 89); Qingdao, Shandong, China
- Education: Shandong University
- Scientific career
- Fields: Aquaculture
- Workplaces: Yellow Sea Fisheries Research Institute, Chinese Academy of Fishery Sciences

Chinese name
- Simplified Chinese: 赵法箴
- Traditional Chinese: 趙法箴
Transcriptions
Standard Mandarin
- Hanyu Pinyin: Zhào Fǎzhēn

Zhao Fazhen (Chinese: 赵法箴; 13 May 1935 – 26 February 2025) was a Chinese aquaculturist, a member of the China Association of Agricultural Science Societies, and an academician of the Chinese Academy of Engineering. He was a member of the 7th, 8th, 9th and 10th National Committee of the Chinese People's Political Consultative Conference.

== Biography ==
Zhao was born in Ye County, Shandong, on 13 May 1935. He attended Ye County Middle School (now Laizhou No.1 Middle School) and Yantai Aquatic Technology School. In 1954, he enrolled at Shandong University, where he majored in the Department of Aquaculture.

After graduation in 1958, Zhao was assigned to the Yellow Sea Fisheries Research Institute, Chinese Academy of Fishery Sciences, where he was promoted to associate research fellow in January 1983 and to research fellow in December 1988.

Zhao died on 26 February 2025 in Qingdao, at the age of 90.

== Honours and awards ==
- 1985 State Science and Technology Progress Award (First Class) for industrial artificial seedling cultivation technology for shrimp
- 1987 State Science and Technology Progress Award (Second Class) for research on artificial combined feed for shrimp
- 1995 Member of the Chinese Academy of Engineering (CAE)
- 2004 5th Guanghua Engineering Science and Technology Award
