= Zhuang Qiaosheng =

Chinese geneticist and plant breeder (1916–2022)

- 庄巧生
- Born: 5 August 1916; Minhou County, Fujian, China
- Died: 8 May 2022 (aged 105); Beijing, China
- Education: University of Nanking; Kansas State University; Cornell University
- Scientific career
- Fields: Genetic breeding
- Workplaces: Chinese Academy of Agricultural Sciences

Chinese name
- Simplified Chinese: 庄巧生
- Traditional Chinese: 莊巧生
Transcriptions
Standard Mandarin
- Hanyu Pinyin: Zhuāng Qiǎoshēng

Zhuang Qiaosheng (Chinese: 庄巧生; 5 August 1916 – 8 May 2022) was a Chinese geneticist and breeder, and an academician of the Chinese Academy of Sciences. He was a member of the China Democratic League. He was a member of the 7th National Committee of the Chinese People's Political Consultative Conference.

== Biography ==
Zhuang was born into a family of farming background in the town of Nanyu in Minhou County, Fujian, on 5 August 1916. His grandmother and mother were farming at home. After graduating from Secondary Normal School, his father settled in a remote island in Dutch Sumatra to teach primary school. In 1921, when he was five years old, his family moved to Southeast Asia and he studied at Minde Primary School founded by local overseas Chinese. The family returned to Fuzhou in 1925, where he was admitted to Fuzhou Private Sanmin Middle School in January 1928. In January 1935, he was accepted to the College of Agriculture of the University of Nanking, majoring in agronomy and minoring in auxiliary plants.

After graduating in February 1939, he worked at the Guiyang Workstation of the Central Agricultural Experimental Institute. In August 1940, he became an assistant to Professor Jin Zizhong (靳自重). In the winter of 1942, he resigned and was invited by Dai Songen (戴松恩) to be a technician and head of Hubei Agricultural Improvement Institute in Enshi County (now Enshi City). In October 1944, recommended by Dai Songen, he returned to the Wheat Miscellaneous Grain Department of the Central Agricultural Experimental Institute as a technician to engage in wheat variety improvement. In July 1945, he arrived in the United States and studied the quality identification technology of durum wheat at the Kansas State University, Cornell University, and Ohio Federal Laboratory. He returned to China in August 1946 and continued to work at the Central Agricultural Experimental Institute. In October, he was transferred to the Beiping Agricultural Experimental Farm of the Central Agricultural Experimental Institute at No. 12 Baixiang'an near Weigong Village, Beijing, and had stayed there for more than 60 years.

After the peaceful liberation of Peiping in February 1949, he had successively served as technical principal, associate researcher, researcher and director of the Wheat Production Office of North China Institute of Agricultural Sciences (formerly known as the Beiping Agricultural Experimental Farm of the Central Agricultural Experimental Institute and was reshuffled as Chinese Academy of Agricultural Sciences in July 1957). In August 1957, he served as a researcher of the Institute of Crop Breeding and Cultivation, Chinese Academy of Agricultural Sciences, and then successively served as deputy director or director of Rice and Wheat Room, Genetics and Breeding Room, Breeding room and Winter Wheat Room. In March 1971, he was a researcher of the Crop institute of Beijing Academy of Agricultural Sciences. In May 1978, he became a researcher of the Institute of Crop Breeding and Cultivation, Chinese Academy of Agricultural Sciences, where he concurrently served as deputy director between November 1978 and June 1987. He retired in July 2018.

On 8 May 2022, he died from an illness in Beijing, at the age of 105.

== Contributions ==
He bred more than 20 new winter wheat varieties with high yield, disease resistance and early maturity in four batches represented by Huabei 187, Beijing 8, Beijing 10, Fengkang 2, and Fengkang 8.

== Honours and awards ==
- 1987 State Science and Technology Progress Award (Second Class)
- 1991 Member of the Chinese Academy of Sciences (CAS)
- 1995 Science and Technology Progress Award of the Ho Leung Ho Lee Foundation
