= Xiyang County =

Xiyang 昔阳县 Siyang
- County
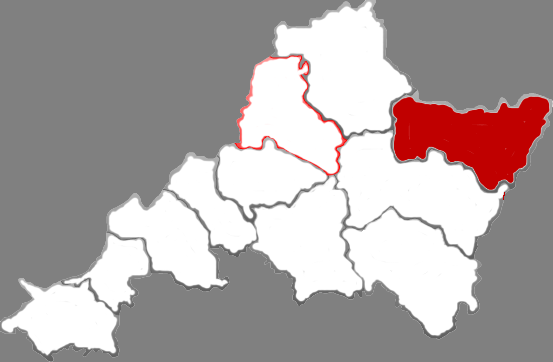
- Xiyang in Jinzhong

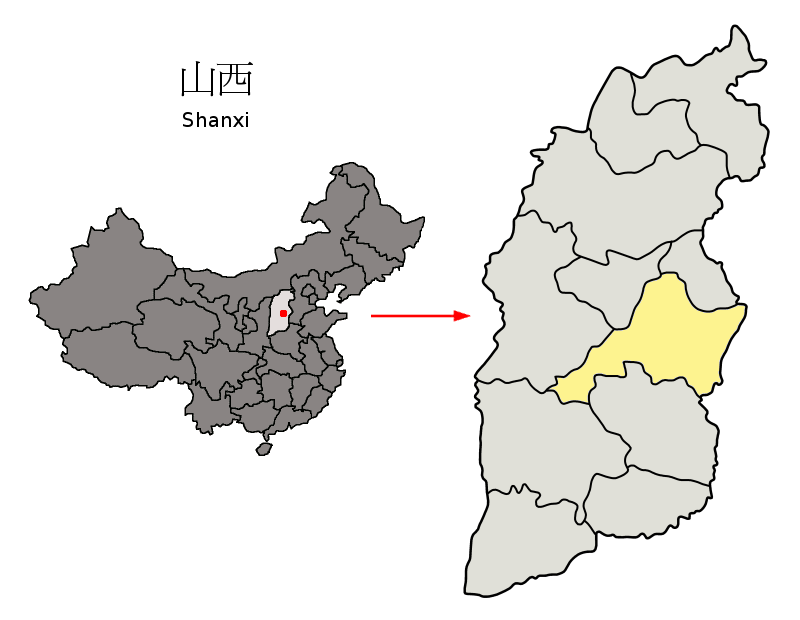
- Jinzhong in Shanxi
- Coordinates: 37°36′40″N 113°42′25″E
- Country: People's Republic of China
- Province: Shanxi
- Prefecture-level city: Jinzhong

Government
  - Magistrate: Fan Kai
  - CCP Secretary: Huang Yaping

Area
  - County: 1,954 km^{2} (754 sq mi)
  - Urban: 26.87 km^{2} (10.37 sq mi)
- Highest elevation: 1,833 m (6,014 ft)
- Lowest elevation: 560 m (1,840 ft)

Population (2023)
  - County: 185,143
  - Density: 94.75/km^{2} (245.4/sq mi)
  - Urban: 94,041
  - Urban density: 3,500/km^{2} (9,065/sq mi)
- Time zone: UTC+8 (China Standard)
- Postal code: 045300
- Area code: 0354
- Vehicle registration: 晋K
- Website: xiyang.gov.cn

Xiyang County (simplified Chinese: 昔阳县; traditional Chinese: 昔陽縣; pinyin: Xīyáng Xiàn) is a county in the east of Shanxi province, China, bordering Hebei province to the east. It is the easternmost county-level division of the prefecture-level city of Jinzhong. Xiyang County is located at the western foot of Taihang Mountain, bordering Zanhuang County, Neiqiu County, Jingxing County, and Xingtai in Hebei province to the east, Heshun County to the south, and Pingding County in Yangquan to the north.

== Administrative divisions ==
Xiyang County has five towns, five townships, and one urban social affairs service center under its jurisdiction.

=== Towns ===
- Leping (乐平镇)
- Gaoluo (皋落镇)
- Yetou (冶头镇)
- Zhanshang (or Dianshang) (沾尚镇)
- Dazhai (大寨镇)

=== Townships ===
- Lijiazhuang (李家庄乡)
- Jiedu (界都乡)
- Sandu (三都乡)
- Zhaobi (赵壁乡)
- Kongshi (孔氏乡)

=== Urban social affairs service center ===
- Cheng Qu (Urban) social affairs service center (城区社会事务服务中心)

== Climate ==
Climate data for Xiyang, elevation 940 m (3,080 ft), (1991–2020 normals, extremes 1981–2010)
Month	Jan	Feb	Mar	Apr	May	Jun	Jul	Aug	Sep	Oct	Nov	Dec	Year
Record high °C (°F)	14.1 (57.4)	18.1 (64.6)	26.1 (79.0)	34.5 (94.1)	34.6 (94.3)	39.7 (103.5)	37.9 (100.2)	33.7 (92.7)	34.1 (93.4)	27.5 (81.5)	21.7 (71.1)	14.5 (58.1)	39.7 (103.5)
Mean daily maximum °C (°F)	2.5 (36.5)	6.1 (43.0)	12.4 (54.3)	19.7 (67.5)	25.2 (77.4)	28.7 (83.7)	29.3 (84.7)	27.6 (81.7)	23.6 (74.5)	18.0 (64.4)	10.4 (50.7)	4.0 (39.2)	17.3 (63.1)
Daily mean °C (°F)	−4.9 (23.2)	−1.6 (29.1)	4.7 (40.5)	12.1 (53.8)	17.9 (64.2)	21.7 (71.1)	23.1 (73.6)	21.5 (70.7)	16.6 (61.9)	10.3 (50.5)	3.0 (37.4)	−3.0 (26.6)	10.1 (50.2)
Mean daily minimum °C (°F)	−10.4 (13.3)	−7.3 (18.9)	−1.5 (29.3)	5.2 (41.4)	10.9 (51.6)	15.3 (59.5)	18.1 (64.6)	16.7 (62.1)	11.1 (52.0)	4.6 (40.3)	−2.4 (27.7)	−8.1 (17.4)	4.4 (39.8)
Record low °C (°F)	−25.7 (−14.3)	−23.7 (−10.7)	−17.4 (0.7)	−10.3 (13.5)	−2.8 (27.0)	4.2 (39.6)	9.3 (48.7)	5.6 (42.1)	−2.3 (27.9)	−9.4 (15.1)	−21.7 (−7.1)	−25.1 (−13.2)	−25.7 (−14.3)
Average precipitation mm (inches)	3.5 (0.14)	5.9 (0.23)	10.4 (0.41)	29.4 (1.16)	40.6 (1.60)	63.8 (2.51)	140.5 (5.53)	114.5 (4.51)	63.5 (2.50)	31.0 (1.22)	14.6 (0.57)	3.6 (0.14)	521.3 (20.52)
Average precipitation days (≥ 0.1 mm)	2.8	3.3	3.8	6.2	6.5	10.7	14.0	12.2	9.0	6.3	3.8	1.9	80.5
Average snowy days	3.8	4.6	3.0	1.1	0	0	0	0	0	0.2	2.5	2.8	18
Average relative humidity (%)	49	48	45	47	50	60	74	77	73	65	56	49	58
Mean monthly sunshine hours	182.9	174.3	208.2	231.0	252.1	223.9	195.2	194.9	187.0	190.5	177.7	179.6	2,397.3
Percentage possible sunshine	59	57	56	58	57	51	44	47	51	56	59	61	55
Source: China Meteorological Administration

== See also ==
- Chen Yonggui
- Dazhai
