= Wu Kongming =

Chinese politician (born 1964)

- 吴孔明

President of the Chinese Academy of Agricultural Sciences
- Incumbent
- Assumed office October 2021
- Preceded by: Tang Huajun

Personal details
- Born: 18 July 1964 (age 62) Gushi County, Henan, China
- Party: Chinese Communist Party
- Education: Henan Agricultural University
- Scientific career
- Fields: Plant pest
- Workplaces: Chinese Academy of Agricultural Sciences

Chinese name
- Simplified Chinese: 吴孔明
- Traditional Chinese: 吳孔明
Transcriptions
Standard Mandarin
- Hanyu Pinyin: Wú Kǒngmíng

Wu Kongming (Chinese: 吴孔明; born 18 July 1964) is a Chinese politician, currently serving as president of the Chinese Academy of Agricultural Sciences.

He is an alternate of the 20th Central Committee of the Chinese Communist Party.

== Biography ==
Wu was born in Gushi County, Henan, on 18 July 1964. He attended Henan Agricultural University where he received his bachelor's degree in plant protection in 1984. After completing his master's degree in entomology from the Postgraduate Department of Henan Academy of Agriculture and Forestry Sciences in 1987, he entered the Graduate School of Chinese Academy of Agricultural Sciences where he obtained his doctor's degree in entomology in 1994.

Wu joined the Plant Protection Institute, Henan Academy of Agricultural Sciences as an assistant researcher in July 1987, and moved to the Institute of Plant Protection, Chinese Academy of Agricultural Sciences in September 1994. He moved up the ranks to become deputy director in December 2003 and director in January 2006. He was promoted to vice president in October 2012. In October 2021, he was promoted again to become president, a position at vice-ministerial level.

== Honours and awards ==
- 2007 State Science and Technology Progress Award (Second Class)
- 2010 State Science and Technology Progress Award (Second Class)
- 2011 Member of the Chinese Academy of Engineering (CAE)
- 2011 Science and Technology Progress Award of the Ho Leung Ho Lee Foundation

Academic offices
Preceded by Tang Huajun	President of the Chinese Academy of Agricultural Sciences; 2021–	Incumbent
