= Wang Lianzheng =

Chinese agronomist and politician (1930–2018)

Wang Lianzheng (Chinese: 王连铮; 15 October 1930 – 12 December 2018) was a Chinese agronomist and politician. He served as President of the Chinese Academy of Agricultural Sciences, Vice Governor of Heilongjiang Province, and Vice Minister of Agriculture. An expert in soybean breeding and genetics, he was elected a foreign fellow of the Russian Academy of Agricultural Sciences and of the Indian National Academy of Agricultural Sciences.

== Early life ==
Wang was born on 15 October 1930 in Haicheng, Liaoning, China. After graduating from Northeast Agricultural University in 1954, he worked for the Ministry of Forestry of China and then Heilongjiang Academy of Agricultural Sciences. In October 1960, he went to the Soviet Union to study at Moscow Timiryazev Agricultural Academy. After earning a doctoral degree, in October 1962, he returned to Heilongjiang Academy of Agricultural Sciences where he worked as a research scientist.

== Career ==
During the Cultural Revolution, Wang was persecuted and forced to perform hard labour. He was rehabilitated and returned to work in February 1970 and served as Director of the Soybean Research Institute of Heilongjiang Academy of Agricultural Sciences, and later Vice President and then President of the academy.

In February 1980, Wang was appointed Vice Governor of Heilongjiang Province, while concurrently serving as President of Heilongjiang Academy of Agricultural Sciences. From December 1987 to November 1994, he served as the fourth President of the Chinese Academy of Agricultural Sciences. From December 1988 to April 1991, he concurrently served as China's Vice Minister of Agriculture. He was elected a delegate to the 9th National People's Congress.

Wang was an expert in soybean breeding and genetics. He developed more than 34 soybean cultivars, which have been planted to 150 million mu of farmland. He published more than 170 scientific papers and the monographs Genetics and Cultivation of Soybean (大豆遗传育种学) and Modern Chinese Soybean (现代中国大豆). He was awarded the State Science and Technology Progress Award (First Class) once and the State Technological Invention Award (Second Class) twice. He was elected a foreign fellow of the Russian Academy of Agricultural Sciences in 1988 and of the Indian National Academy of Agricultural Sciences in 1994.

== Death ==
Wang died on 12 December 2018 in Beijing, at the age of 88.
