= Jin Shanbao =

Chinese agricultural educator

Jin Shanbao (simplified Chinese: 金善宝; traditional Chinese: 金善寶; 2 July 1895 – 26 June 1997) was a Chinese agricultural educator and agronomist.

== Biography ==
Jin Shanbao was born on July 2, 1895, in Zhuji, Zhejiang Province. Jin entered the Fifth High School of Zhejiang Province in Shaoxing, where he then studied for four years. In 1917, despite a good grade, his family's poverty caused him to be unable to enroll in many universities, however, he saw an enrollment prospectus for the Agricultural Specialization Section of the Nanjing Normal College granting free tuition, and he decided to enroll in this school. In 1926, Jin married Yao Bihui. In May 1928, he completed "Preliminary Classification of Wheat in China", which was the first paper on wheat classification research in China. In 1930, Jin came to the United States to attend graduate school at Cornell University and the University of Minnesota.

In 1932, Jin returned to China from the United States and taught at Zhejiang University, National Central University and Jiangnan University. In 1934, he completed his statistics on the extent of various types of wheat grown in China, and the Commercial Press published his Treatise on Practical Wheat, the first scientific monograph on wheat in China, which he had compiled from lecture notes. His research work received a blockage during the Second Sino-Japanese War. In 1944, he became involved in the Democracy and Science Forum, which later became the Jiusan Society. After the founding of the People's Republic of China, he served as president of the Nanjing Agricultural College and vice mayor of Nanjing. In 1956, he formally joined the Chinese Communist Party. In March 1957, Jin Shanbao became vice president of the newly established Chinese Academy of Agricultural Sciences, and in 1964, succeeded Ding Ying as president.

During the Cultural Revolution, the Chinese Academy of Agricultural Sciences was in trouble, though Jin was spared from struggle sessions because he was greeted by Zhou Enlai and Mao Zedong in 1967. After the Cultural Revolution, Jin was involved in recalling researchers who had been sent to the countryside and rebuilding the Nanjing Agricultural College, later known as Nanjing Agricultural University.

In 1997, Jin died of a gastrointestinal hemorrhage.
