= Fang Zhiyuan =

Chinese engineer (1939–2023)

- 方智远
- Born: 3 September 1939; Hengyang, Hunan, China
- Died: 20 January 2023 (aged 83); Beijing, China
- Education: Wuhan University
- Scientific career
- Fields: Genetic breeding
- Workplaces: Institute of Vegetables and Flowers, Chinese Academy of Agricultural Sciences

Chinese name
- Simplified Chinese: 方智远
- Traditional Chinese: 方智遠
Transcriptions
Standard Mandarin
- Hanyu Pinyin: Fāng Zhìyuǎn

Fang Zhiyuan (Chinese: 方智远; 3 September 1939 – 20 January 2023) was a Chinese engineer in the field of genetic breeding, and an academician of the Chinese Academy of Engineering.

Fang was a member of the 9th and 10th National Committee of the Chinese People's Political Consultative Conference.

== Biography ==
Fang was born in Hengyang, Hunan, on 3 September 1939. He attended Hengyang No. 1 High School. In 1960, he was admitted to Wuhan University, where he graduated in 1964.

After university, Fang was despatched to the Institute of Vegetables and Flowers, Chinese Academy of Agricultural Sciences, where he moved up the ranks to become director in 1995. He joined the Chinese Communist Party (CCP) in 1980.

On 20 January 2023, he died in Beijing, at the age of 83.

== Honours and awards ==
- 1991 State Science and Technology Progress Award (Second Class) for breeding of new cabbage varieties "Zhonggan 8" and "Zhonggan 11"
- 1995 Member of the Chinese Academy of Engineering (CAE)
- 1996 Science and Technology Progress Award of the Ho Leung Ho Lee Foundation
- 1998 State Science and Technology Progress Award (Second Class) for breeding of a new early-maturing spring cabbage variety "8398"
- 2014 State Science and Technology Progress Award (Second Class) for establishment of breeding technology system and breeding of new varieties of male sterile line in cabbage

Non-profit organization positions
Preceded by Zhu Dewei (朱德蔚)	President of the Chinese Society for Horticultural Science; 2005–2013	Succeeded by Du Yongchen (杜永臣)
