= Wang Fosong =

Chinese chemist (1933–2022)

- 王佛松
- Born: 23 May 1933; Xingning County, Guangdong, China
- Died: 31 December 2022 (aged 89); Beijing, China
- Education: Wuhan University; Soviet Academy of Sciences
- Scientific career
- Fields: Polymer chemistry
- Workplaces: Changchun Institute of Applied Chemistry, Chinese Academy of Sciences

Wang Fosong (Chinese: 王佛松; pinyin: Wáng Fósōng; 23 May 1933 – 31 December 2022) was a Chinese polymer chemist, and an academician of the Chinese Academy of Sciences.

Wang was a member of the 7th National Committee of the Chinese People's Political Consultative Conference. He was a member of the Standing Committees of the 8th and 9th National People's Congress.

== Biography ==
Wang was born into a family of farming background in Xingning County, Guangdong, on 23 May 1933. In 1951, he was admitted to Wuhan University, where he majored in the Department of Chemistry. After graduating in 1955, he was sent to study at the Soviet Academy of Sciences on government scholarships, obtaining a vice-doctorate degree in 1960.

Wang returned to China in 1960 and that same year became a member of the Changchun Institute of Applied Chemistry, Chinese Academy of Sciences. He moved up the ranks to become assistant director in 1984 and director in 1985. He rose to become vice president of the Chinese Academy of Sciences in 1988, a post he kept until 1994.

On 31 December 2022, Wang died in Beijing, at the age of 89.

== Honours and awards ==
- State Natural Science Award (Second Class)
- 1985 State Natural Science Award (Special)
- 1988 State Natural Science Award (Second Class)
- 1991 State Natural Science Award (Third Class)
- 1991 Member of the Chinese Academy of Sciences (CAS)
- 2000 Fellow of The World Academy of Sciences (TWAS)
- 2002 Science and Technology Progress Award of the Ho Leung Ho Lee Foundation
