= Yang Zhenchao =

Chinese politician

- 杨振超

Vice Governor of Anhui
- In office January 2013 – May 2016

Communist Party Secretary of Huainan
- In office July 2007 – February 2012
- Preceded by: Chen Shili (陈世礼)
- Succeeded by: Fang Xiping

Personal details
- Born: August 1960 (age 66) Jinzhai County, Anhui, China
- Party: Chinese Communist Party (1983–2016, expelled)
- Education: Northeastern University; Renmin University of China

Yang Zhenchao (Chinese: 杨振超; pinyin: Yāng Zhēnchāo; born August 1960) is a former Chinese politician, who served as Vice Governor of Anhui and Chinese Communist Party Committee Secretary of Huainan. He was dismissed from his position in May 2016 for investigation by the Central Commission for Discipline Inspection.

== Career ==
Yang was born in Jinzhai County, Anhui. He was graduated from Northeastern University and Renmin University of China and joined work in 1977. In 1983, he worked in Tongling Nonferrous Metals and became the manager from 1998 to 2003. He also served as director of State-owned Assets Supervision and Administration Commission of the State Council of Anhui and director of Economic Committee of Anhui. In 2007, he elected as Chinese Communist Party Committee Secretary of Huainan. In 2013, he was promoted to the post of Vice Governor of Anhui, ranked third; his tenure as vice-governor was said to be mediocre.

On May 24, 2016, Yang was placed under investigation by the Central Commission for Discipline Inspection, the CCP's internal disciplinary body, for "serious violations of regulations". Yang was the third provincial-ministerial level official in Anhui implicated in the anti-corruption campaign under Xi Jinping and the first official of his seniority investigated during the second-round of inspections by the CCDI. He is expelled from the CCP on July 26, 2016. On May 3, 2017, Yang was sentenced to life in prison for bribery, plundering the public fund and abuse of power.
