= Chen Zhangliang =

Chen Zhangliang (Chinese: 陈章良; born February 3, 1961, Fuqing, Fujian) graduated from the South China College of Tropical Crops (now Hainan University) in 1983, and then was sent to study in the United States by the Chinese Government. He finished his Ph.D. in Washington University in St. Louis. After he returned to China in 1987, he worked in Peking University as dean of faculty of biology and chair of school of life science. He became the vice president of Peking University in 1995, and president of China Agricultural University in 2002.

He became vice-governor of Guangxi in 2007.
