= Du Runsheng =

Chinese politician and economist

- 杜润生

Member of the Central Advisory Commission
- In office 1987–1992
- Director: Chen Yun

Director of Rural Development Research Center of the State Council
- In office 1983–1989

Director of Rural Policy Research Office of Secretariat of the Chinese Communist Party
- In office 1983–1989

Deputy Director of National Agricultural Commission of the People's Republic of China
- In office 1979–1983

Personal details
- Born: Du De (杜德); July 18, 1913 Yangyi Village, Taigu County, Shanxi, China
- Died: October 9, 2015 (aged 102) Beijing Hospital, Beijing
- Party: Chinese Communist Party
- Children: 3
- Education: Taiyuan National Normal College; Beijing Normal University

Military service
- Allegiance: China
- Branch/service: Eighth Route Army (1937–1945); People's Liberation Army (1945–1949)
- Years of service: 1936–1949
- Battles/wars: Second Sino-Japanese War; Chinese Civil War

Chinese name
- Traditional Chinese: 杜潤生
- Simplified Chinese: 杜润生
Transcriptions
Standard Mandarin
- Hanyu Pinyin: Dù Rùnshēng

Du Runsheng (Chinese: 杜润生; pinyin: Dù Rùnshēng; July 18, 1913 – October 9, 2015) was a Chinese military officer, revolutionary leader, politician, and economist. He has been hailed as "China's father of rural reform". From 1982 to 1986, he drew up the annual "Document No.1 of the Central Government" about rural reform, which promoted the development of rural areas. Du's students included Wang Qishan, Justin Yifu Lin, Zhou Qiren, Wen Tiejun, Wang Xiaoqiang, Chen Xiwen, Zhang Musheng, Du Ying and Weng Yongxi.

Du was a member of the 12th and 13th National People's Congress and a member of the Central Advisory Commission.

== Biography ==
=== Education and early career ===
Du was born Du De (杜德) on July 18, 1913 in Yangyi Village of Taigu County, Shanxi province, during the dawn of the Republic of China. He was accepted to Taiyuan National Normal College in 1929 and he entered Beijing Normal University in 1934. In 1935 he was detained by the Beiyang government for taking part in anti-government movement.

=== Military campaign in north China ===
He joined the Chinese Communist Party (CCP) in 1936. That same year, he served as chief captain of the Vanguard of National Liberation and head of its Publicity Department. During the Second Sino-Japanese War, he served in various administrative and political roles Taihang Mountain border. He participated in the Huai-Hai Campaign during the Chinese Civil War. He served successively as secretary-general of Central Plains Bureau of the CCP Central Committee, secretary-general of Central China Bureau of the CCP Central Committee, and party boss of CCP Henan-Anhui-Jiangsu Committee.

=== Land reform ===
Du was one of the CCP's foremost rural experts and served an important role in China's land reform movement. According to Du, settling accounts through the land reform movement focused on mobilizing peasants to:

wage struggle through the use of reason with landlords face to face, to expose one by one the landlord's economic exploitation of the peasantry, their political oppression of the peasantry, the facts of how in terms of human dignity they had humiliated the peasantry, in order to force landlords to admit guilt, so that they cannot but offer up their land, while the peasantry is in legal and rightful position, and can feel proud and elated as they boldly and assuredly take possession of the land.

The subsequent study of the land reform movement overseen and edited by Du concludes that "[l]and reform was not only a profound economic transformation, but a profound political transformation as well, a prelude to the establishment and construction of a new China." In Du's view, land reform was significant in constructing a China within the mold of the modern nation-state system and in China's peasants developing class consciousness. Du recounted:

[L]and reform was not a political favor bestowed [upon the peasants], but rather was designed to overthrow feudal ruling power and install a ruling force dominated by the villages' peasant masses so as to raise the self-consciousness of the peasants, instigate class struggle, and promote the self-liberation of the peasant masses so as to realize the goal of "land back to the family."

According to Du, this reorganization of the grassroots increased the organizational mobilizing capacity of the central government, enhancing its ability to unify the country and its political direction and "[w]ith regard to an agrarian nation that had previously been seen as a 'plate of loose sand,' the significance of all this was enormous."

=== After the establishment of PRC ===
After the founding of the Communist State, Du became secretary-general of Central China Bureau of the CCP Central Committee and its deputy director of the Land Reform Commission. He led the local land reform movement. In 1953, he was transferred to Beijing and he joined the newly created Central Rural Work Department of the CCP, working as secretary-general of the Head Deng Zihui. He vigorously developed the private economy, but got criticized for "taking the capitalist road". Mao Zedong evaluated him as "a timid and conservative man". He also served as deputy director of the Rural Office of the State Council. From 1956 towards, he served successively as deputy director of the Office of Scientific Planning Commission of the State Council, secretary-general and CCP Deputy Committee Secretary of Chinese Academy of Sciences.

=== Cultural Revolution ===
In 1966, Mao Zedong launched the Cultural Revolution, Du Runsheng was suspended and suffered political persecution. In 1970, he was sent to the May Seventh Cadre Schools to work in Qianjiang, Hubei.

=== Economic reforms ===
In December 1978, after the 3rd Plenary Session of the 11th Central Committee of the Chinese Communist Party, he was rehabilitated by Hu Yaobang.

He was deputy director of National Agricultural Commission of the People's Republic of China in 1979, and held that office until 1983, when he promoted to become director of Rural Policy Research Office of Secretariat of the Chinese Communist Party and director of Rural Development Research Center of the State Council, he remained in that positions until 1989, while these two agencies were canceled. In 1980, he drafted the Several Problems about the Further Strengthening and Improving the System of Rural Production Responsibility (关于进一步加强和完善农村生产责任制的几个问题), which made the household responsibility system (包产到户/包干到户) first gained legal status.

He served as honorary president of Chinese Association of Agricultural Science Societies, president of China Society of Cooperative Economics, director-general of Chinese Association of Agricultural Economics, and director-general of China Society of Territorial Economists in his old age.

=== Death ===
On October 9, 2015, he died in Beijing Hospital, Beijing.

== Personal life ==
Du had three children.
