= Xiang Chongyang =

Chinese politician

Xiang Chongyang (December 4, 1927 – April 22, 2024, Chinese: 相重扬) was originally from Baoying, Jiangsu province, a member of the Chinese Communist Party, an agriculturalist, and served as the Vice Minister of Agriculture of the People's Republic of China. He is the son of Xiang Jutan (Chinese: 相菊潭).

== Biography ==
During his formative years, Xiang Chongyang was forcibly moved by the Japanese invasion of China and pursued his junior high school education in the French Concession in Shanghai. Following the takeover of the Shanghai Concession by the invading Japanese forces, he was compelled to withdraw from school and return home. In 1946, he was readmitted to the Agricultural College of Jinling University, specializing in agronomy, and in March 1949, he became a member of the Chinese Communist Party.

In August 1950, Xiang graduated from Jinling University and thereafter remained at the institution to serve as a secretary and teaching assistant in the dean's office. In 1952, the faculties of higher education institutions were adjusted, leading to the appointment of a teaching assistant at the Nanjing College of Agriculture and Forestry. In 1953, transferred to the Ministry of Higher Education's Department of Agricultural, Forestry, and Hygienic Education; in 1957, following organizational reorganization, Xiang Chongyang was assigned to the officer of Bureau of Higher Education, Ministry of Agriculture of China.

In October 1972, he worked as the deputy director and subsequently the director of the Bureau of Education under the Ministry of Agriculture and Forestry of the People's Republic of China. In September 1980, he served as the deputy director of the Education Bureau of the Ministry of Agriculture of the People's Republic of China, and subsequently as the director of the Education Bureau of the Ministry of Agriculture, Livestock, and Fisheries.

In the spring of 1983, he commenced overseeing agricultural foreign affairs. By August, he was appointed director of the Foreign Affairs Department of the Ministry of Agriculture and Fisheries of the People's Republic of China. In February 1984, he ascended to the position of vice minister of the Ministry of Agriculture and Fisheries. Subsequently, in May 1988, he was designated vice minister of the Ministry of Agriculture.

Xiang Chongyang died at the age of 97 in Beijing on April 22, 2024.
