= Liu Zhicheng =

Chinese footballer

Personal information
- Date of birth: 28 March 2009 (age 17)
- Place of birth: Shanghai, China
- Height: 1.95 m (6 ft 5 in)
- Position: Centre-back

Team information
- Current team: Qingdao West Coast
- Number: 33

Senior career*
Years	Team	Apps	(Gls)
2026–	Qingdao West Coast	1	(0)

International career^{‡}
2026	China U17	4	(0)
Medal record
Representing China
AFC U-17 Asian Cup
Runner-up	2026 Saudi Arabia
- * Club domestic league appearances and goals as of 19 November 2026 ‡ National team caps and goals as of 20 July 2026

Liu Zhicheng (simplified Chinese: 刘致成; traditional Chinese: 劉致成; pinyin: Liú Zhìchéng; born 28 March 2009) is a Chinese professional footballer who plays as a centre-back for Chinese Super League club Qingdao West Coast.

== Early life and youth career ==
Liu was born on 28 March 2009. He was registered with the Shanghai Football Association during his youth career. In March 2023, he was selected for the Chinese Football Association's 2023 first phase Elite Youth Player Training Camp (East China Region) for the 2009 and 2010 age groups, held at Jiangsu Province Jiangning Football Training Base from 30 March to 4 April 2023.

== Club career ==
=== Qingdao West Coast ===
On 16 February 2026, Qingdao West Coast officially announced the signing of Liu. On 5 March 2026, Qingdao West Coast announced their 2026 Chinese Super League squad list, with Liu included as a defender wearing number 33. He was named in the matchday squad for the first round of the 2026 Chinese Super League season.

== International career ==
In March 2026, Liu was called up to the China U17 national team for the second phase training camp in Zhaoqing, Guangdong, from 13 March to 1 April 2026, as part of preparations for the 2026 AFC U-17 Asian Cup. He and Qingdao Hainiu player Kuang Zhaolei delayed their reporting to the national team to participate in the second round of Chinese Super League matches on 15 March 2026.

Liu was included in the China U17 squad for the 2026 AFC U-17 Asian Cup held in Saudi Arabia. He appeared as a substitute defender during the tournament. In the final against Japan on 23 May 2026, he came on as a substitute. China finished as runners-up after losing 2–3 to Japan. Following the tournament, the Chinese Football Association sent a letter of appreciation to Qingdao West Coast Football Club for cultivating and contributing Liu to the national team.

== Career statistics ==
=== Club ===
As of 20 July 2026

Appearances and goals by club, season and competition
Club	Season	League			National Cup		Continental		Other		Total	
Club	Season	Division	Apps	Goals	Apps	Goals	Apps	Goals	Apps	Goals	Apps	Goals
Qingdao West Coast	2026	Chinese Super League	0	0	0	0	—		—		0	0
Career total			0	0	0	0	0	0	0	0	0	0

== Honours ==
China U17

- AFC U-17 Asian Cup runner-up: 2026
