= An Min =

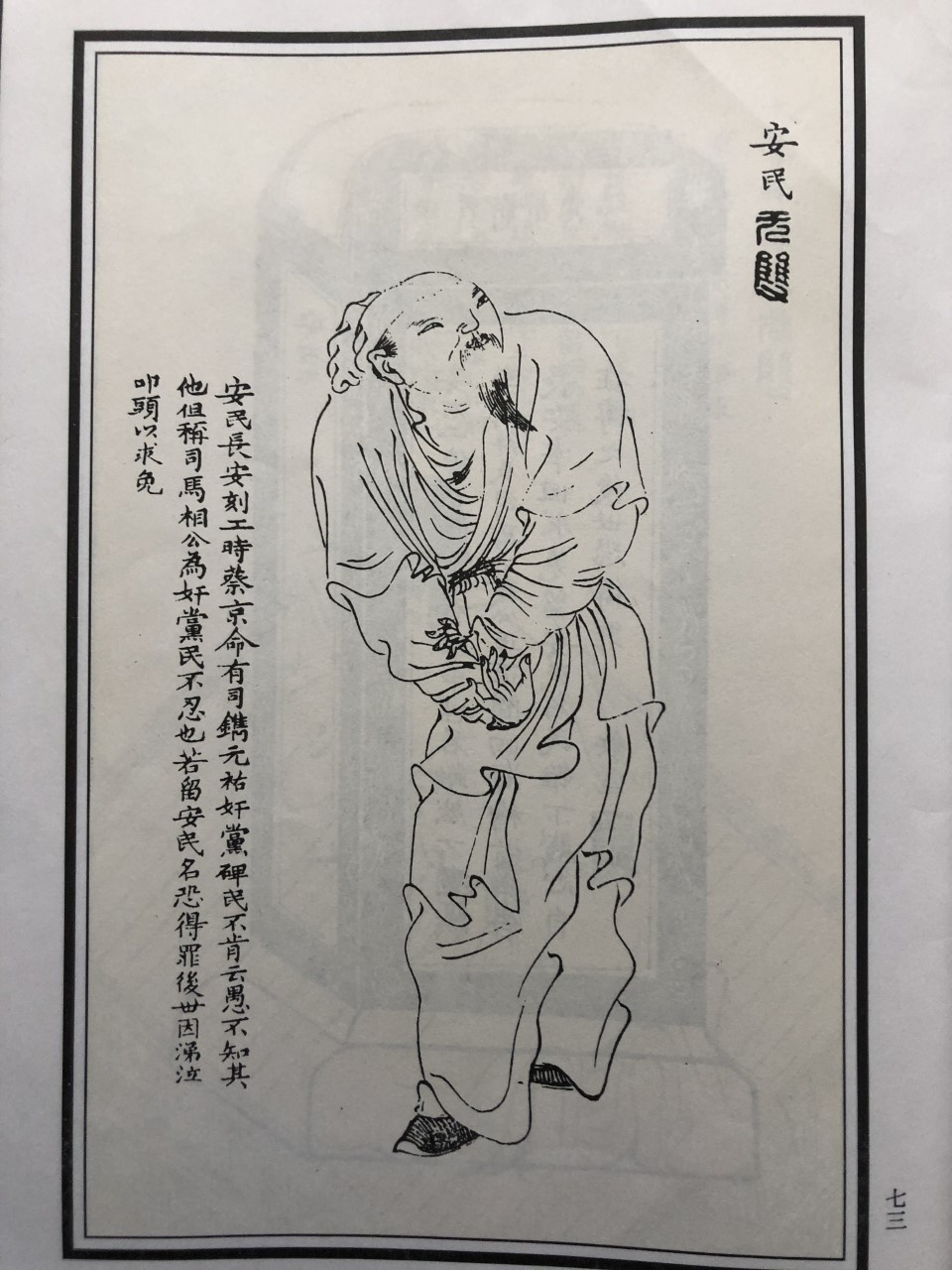
An Min as depicted in the Wu Shuang Pu (無雙譜, Table of Peerless Heroes) by Jin Guliang

An Min (Chinese: 安民; ca. 1050 – 1125) was an official stone carver during the Song dynasty. The story of An Min is included in the book History of Song, where his honorable character and outstanding moral principles are praised.

== Work ==
An Min was working under Emperor Huizong of Song during the Chongning era (崇寧; 1102–1106) and refused to carve the Yuanyou Dang Ren stele for the Yuanyou Partisans. (Yuanyou era: 元祐; 1086–1094). With this kind of loyalty An Min expressed his political stand while other officials dare not to speak out their voices. For his integrity An Min became famous, in spite of his insignificant status.

An Min is depicted in the Wu Shuang Pu (無雙譜, Table of Peerless Heroes), a book of woodcut prints first printed in 1694, by Jin Guliang. The pictures for this book were often distributed and reused, including in porcelain.

== Stele ==
To collect information or archiving in China during the Song dynasty people did use a stone stele (plural stela(s) or stelæ).

== Legacy ==
- "Harvard Fine Arts Library, Special Collections; Stele recording relocation of stelae of classics". "An Min stele (1090)". Harvard Library. Official website
- "Harvard Fine Arts Library, Special Collections; Tomb epitaph of You Shixiong". "An Min stele (1097)". Harvard Library. Official website
