= Dazhai =

Village in Shanxi, northern China

Dazhai 大寨村
- Village
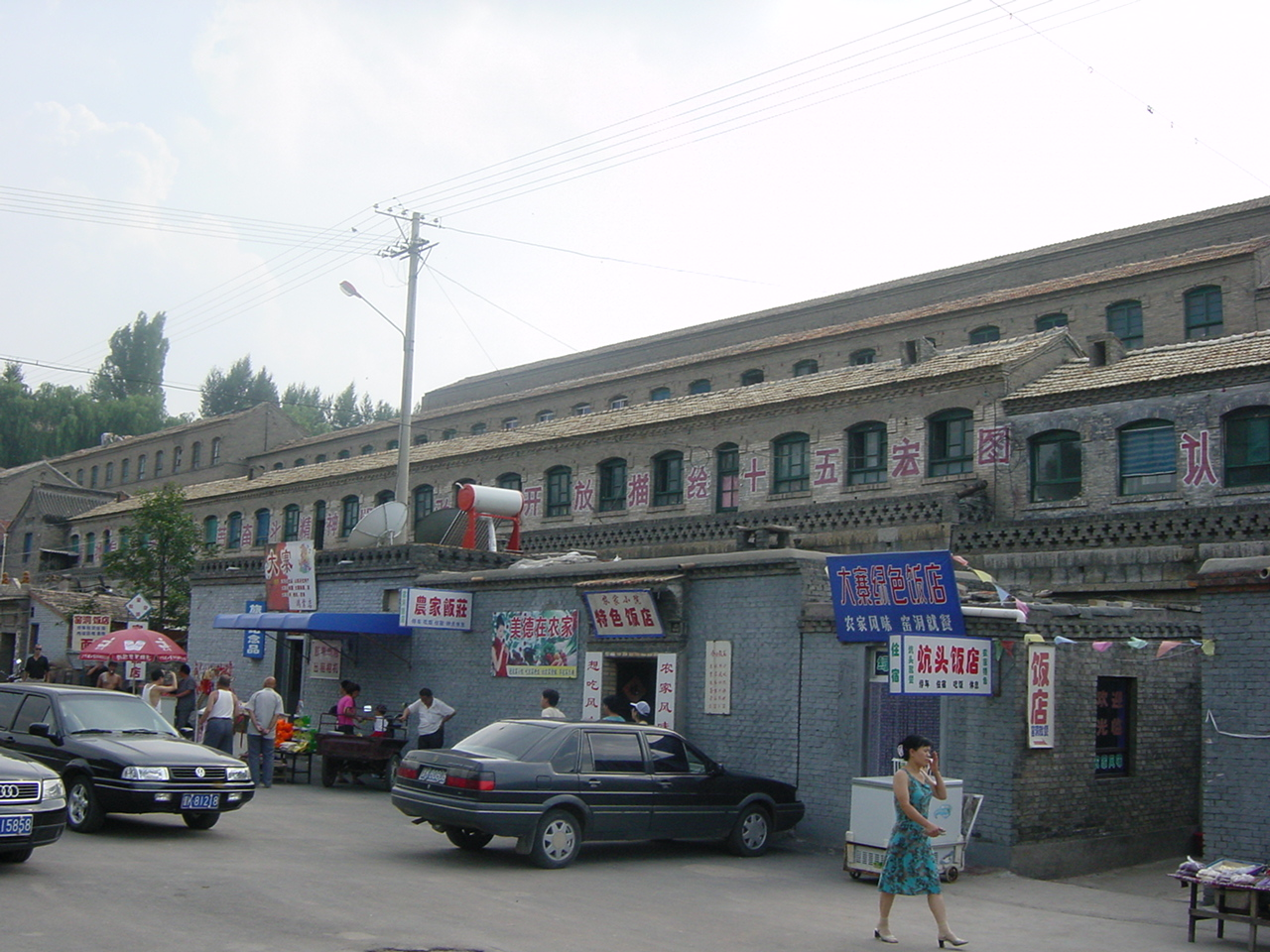

- Location in Shanxi
- Coordinates: 37°34′17″N 113°43′10″E
- Country: China
- Province: Shanxi
- Prefecture-level city: Jinzhong
- County: Xiyang
- Town: Dazhai Town
- Elevation: 948 m (3,110 ft)
- Time zone: UTC+8 (China Standard)

Dazhai (Chinese: 大寨; pinyin: Dàzhài; Wade–Giles: Tachai) is a village and former commune of several hundred farmers in Xiyang County in eastern Shanxi province, chiefly known for Mao Zedong's directive, "Learn from Dazhai in agriculture", which set up Dazhai as the model for agricultural production throughout China during the 1960s and 1970s, amid the Cultural Revolution.

== 'Learn from Dazhai' ==
Dazhai became famous for its agricultural production in the early 1960s. Mao promoted Dazhai as a national model for agricultural production.

Numerous newspaper and magazine stories and books as well as films were published nationwide about how hard and diligently the villagers of Dazhai had worked to build the village into one with not only well-managed fields and bountiful crops, but engineering marvels such as amazing reservoirs and grandiose aqueducts crossing deep valleys for irrigation. Under the leadership of Chen Yonggui, the villagers endeavored to tame nature by turning the mountainous ridges and hills into productive fields and enhancing productivity in such an unfriendly environment. Miraculously, Dazhai indeed became a model for Chinese farmers to contribute grain to the state. They allegedly worked on their own on the principle of self-reliance, without any financial and technical support from the government. A number of songs about Dazhai were popular for a while, the best-known perhaps being "Dazhai Yakexi"《大寨亚克西》(yakexi being the Mandarin transliteration of the Uyghur word meaning good or great), about a Uyghur farmer telling how happy he was after he visited Dazhai. The song was adapted to a dance in which a Uyghur male sang while six ladies accompanied him with dances in the Uyghur traditional style. Both the singer and the dancers were in clothing typical of the Uyghur nationality, which the Han Chinese people found aesthetically appealing. Following the fall of the Gang of Four and the death of Mao Zedong, however, this song was banned. Others include a 1972 piece for sheng and ensemble by Xu Jingqing (许镜清, b. 1942) entitled "Dazhai Hong Hua Bian Di Kai"《大寨红花遍地开》(The Red Flower of Dazhai Blossoms Everywhere); a 1972 song by Yan Cunyi (闫存义) entitled "Dazhai Renxin Xiang Hong Taiyang"《大寨人心向红太阳》(The Hearts of the People of Dazhai Turn Towards the Red Sun); and a 1976 piece for banhu and ensemble by Dou Denggui (窦登贵) entitled "Jianghe Yuantou Dazhai Hua"《江河源头大寨花》(The Dazhai Flower Blooms at the Source of the Rivers).

== See also ==
- Chen Yonggui
- Learn from Daqing in industry (industrial counterpart of Dazhai)
- Mao Zedong Thought
- Potemkin village
- Shanzhai
