= Learn from Dazhai in agriculture =

1963 Chinese campaign organised by Mao Zedong

- Simplified Chinese: 农业学大寨
- Traditional Chinese: 農業學大寨
Transcriptions
Standard Mandarin
- Hanyu Pinyin: Nóngyè xué Dàzhài
- Wade–Giles: Nung-yeh hsüeh Ta-chai

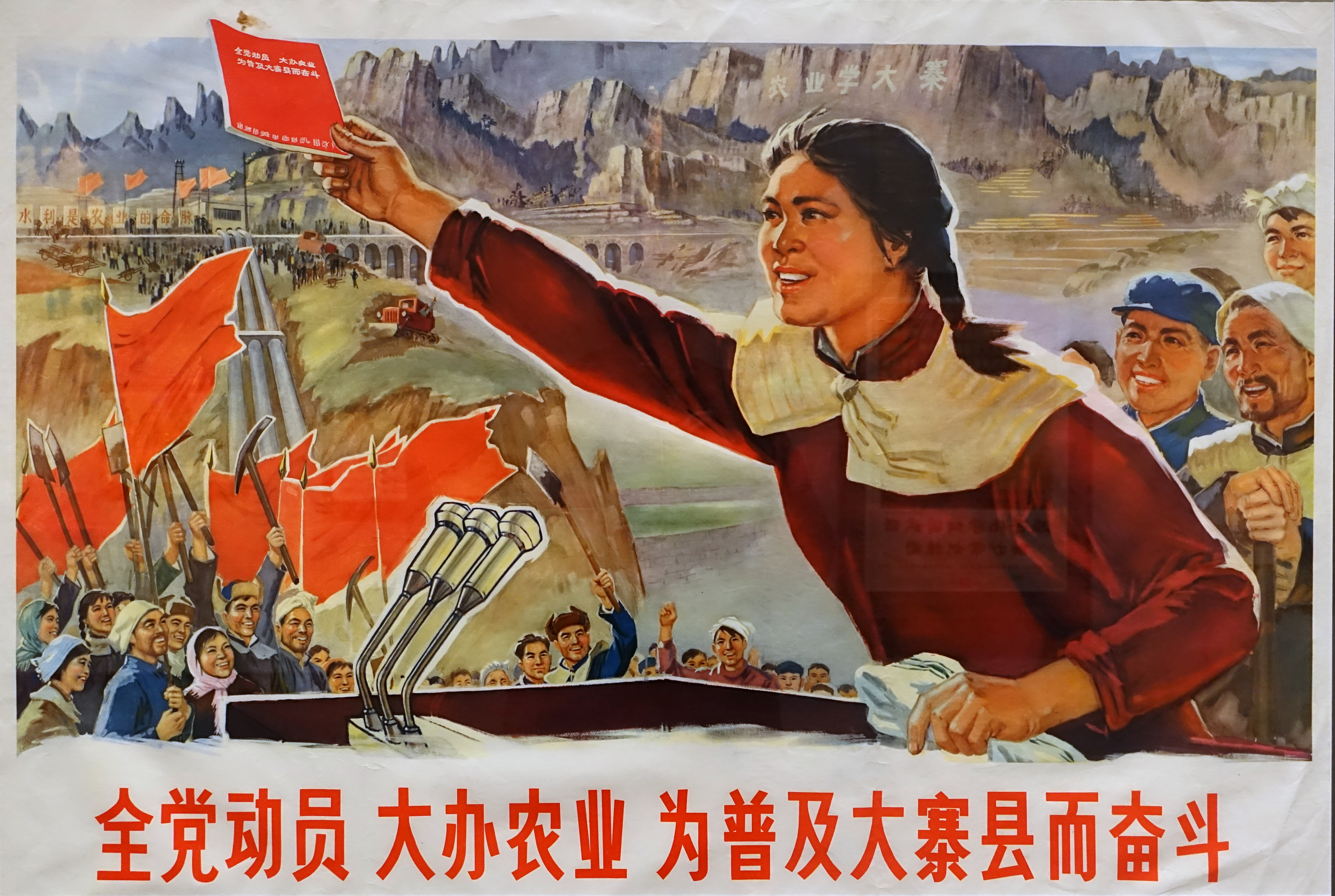
Propaganda poster. The text says, "Let the whole Party mobilize its membership to practice agriculture on a large scale; let them fight to popularize Dazhai County!"

The "Learn from Dazhai in agriculture" Campaign (Chinese: 农业学大寨; pinyin: nóngyè xué Dàzhài, or in Wade-Giles Romanization Tachai) was a campaign organized by Mao Zedong in 1963. The campaign encouraged peasants from all over China to follow from the example of the farmers of the village Dazhai in Shanxi by practicing self-sacrifice and upright political activity.

It grew in importance after the introduction of the Cultural Revolution, but Chen Yonggui and its other proponents were eventually eased out of power by Deng Xiaoping following the removal of the Gang of Four.

== History ==
Dazhai became famous for its agricultural production in the early 1960s. Mao promoted Dazhai as a national model for agricultural production. From 1964 to 1978, Dazhai's model of rural self-reliance was the frequent subject of news reels.

The Learn from Dazhai movement heavily emphasized self-reliance in rural development. This success of Dazhai peasants in building "socialist agriculture"—including overcoming difficult conditions to terrace the land and build an irrigation system—served as the inspiration for the movement. It was significant in Mao Zedong's model of development, which placed agriculture at the foundation of the economy because China had to be self-sufficient at feeding its people. Slogans associated with Dazhai included: "Move the mountains to make farm fields," "Change the sky and alter the land," "Work bitterly, diligently, and with extra energy, and build our village into a Dazhai-like one in three years." The movement boosted rural agricultural construction countrywide.

The commitment of Dazhai women to agricultural work led to the origination of the term Iron Girls to refer to model workers from the Dazhai Young Women Pioneer's Team for agricultural production.

The movement was at its peak during the Cultural Revolution. Farmers from all over the country were organized to visit Dazhai, and well-trained tour guides took posts at important scenes to explain to visitors how the villagers in Daizhai made such achievements with their own hands. One of such scenes was the top of the Tiger Head Mountain where visitors could have a panoramic view of the farm fields, the major irrigation projects as well as the residential area of the villagers. Perhaps hundreds of millions of farmers visited the place during the period and the expenses on their trips were paid by the government.

At this time, farmers throughout China were expected to show their political zeal in following Mao Zedong's directive "Learn from Dazhai in agriculture" ("农业学大寨"). They not only worked during the day, but at night as well, not only in the warm season, but in the depth of winter—a dramatic deviation from their age-old practice. In many places, the farmers literally—and blindly—moved hills (sometimes proclaimed as "mountains"), built reservoirs, tunnels, canals, and so on. As mental motivation, loudspeakers were installed at work sites to broadcast music and songs and films were shown at night on the scene while the farmers took a break.

Meanwhile, a number of leaders of the village made dramatic advances in their political careers. Chen Yonggui, the patriarchal leader of the village, was elected to the Politburo in 1973, reelected in 1977, and named a vice premier of the central government. Guo Fenglian, the Dazhai party secretary, was a favorite of Jiang Qing (the wife of Mao Zedong) and played a significant part in the Chinese political scene.

This campaign was as much political as it was agricultural, and it came to an abrupt end upon Mao's death in 1976. After the victory of Deng Xiaoping over Hua Guofeng, Chen Yonggui, and others following the removal of the Gang of Four from power, Deng's reform and opening up caused Dazhai to become a figure of ridicule, since it was so closely linked to Maoist communal agriculture and socialist propaganda. Chen was removed from the State Council in 1980.

Today, Dazhai is a regional attraction for red tourism.

== See also ==
- Learn from Daqing in industry
- Agriculture in China
- History of agriculture in the People's Republic of China
- Stakhanovite movement
