= Chen Yonggui =

Chinese politician (c. 1915 – 1986)

- 陈永贵
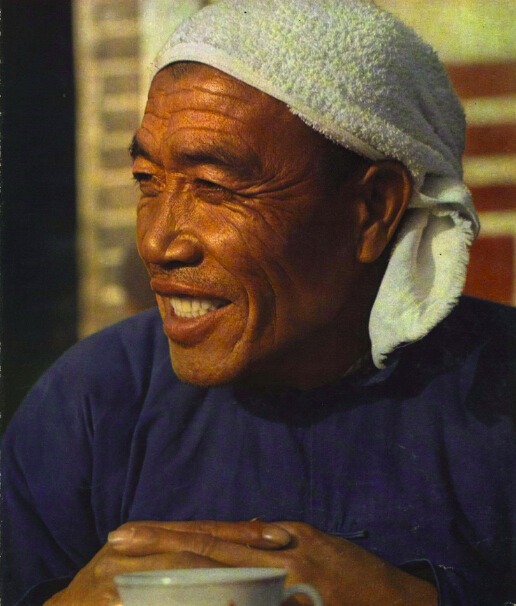
- Chen in 1966

Vice Premier of China
- In office 17 January 1975 – 10 September 1980
- Premier: Zhou Enlai; Hua Guofeng

Personal details
- Born: 14 February 1915 Xiyang County, Shanxi, Republic of China
- Died: 26 March 1986 (aged 71) Beijing, People's Republic of China
- Party: Chinese Communist Party

Chinese name
- Traditional Chinese: 陳永貴
- Simplified Chinese: 陈永贵
Transcriptions
Standard Mandarin
- Hanyu Pinyin: Chén Yǒngguì

Chen Yonggui (Chinese: 陈永贵; pinyin: Chén Yǒngguì; Wade–Giles: Ch'en Yung-kuei; circa 1914 – 26 March 1986) was a Chinese politician. Though he was an illiterate peasant, he became a member of the Politburo of the Chinese Communist Party and Vice Premier of China because of Mao Zedong's recognition of Chen's leadership, during the Cultural Revolution, in turning Dazhai into a model for socialist agriculture.

According to official record of the Xiyang County in Shanxi Province, from 1967 to 1979, under Chen's leadership, the county completed 9,330 projects of agricultural and hydraulic infrastructure construction, extending the total arable land by 6,533 hectares (16,140 acres) but at the cost of 1,040 casualties including 310 deaths.

After Deng Xiaoping initiated the reform and opening up in the late 1970s, Chen gradually lost power and resigned in September 1980. He died of lung cancer in Beijing in 1986.

== Early years ==
Chen Yonggui was born in around 1914 (self-reported as 14 February 1915, the date of the Chinese New Year in 1915) as the son of a poor peasant, who moved to Dazhai when Yonggui was 6 years old, and later hanged himself. This situation forced Chen Yonggui to start working very young to make a living, so he never received formal education.

In 1942, as fighting against communist guerrilla increased in Shanxi Province, where Xiyang County encompassing Dazhai is located, the Japanese tightened their grip on local villages and Chen Yonggui was elected Dazhai representative in the puppet Rejuvenating Asia Society, but resigned and left the village after barely surviving a one-year detention in a concentration camp in 1943–1944. Because of this, he was briefly detained as a suspected collaborationist after Japan's defeat but soon released.

He eagerly took part in the Land Reform Movement initiated by the Chinese Communist Party (CCP) against landlords and joined the CCP in 1948.

== Political career ==
=== The Dazhai period ===
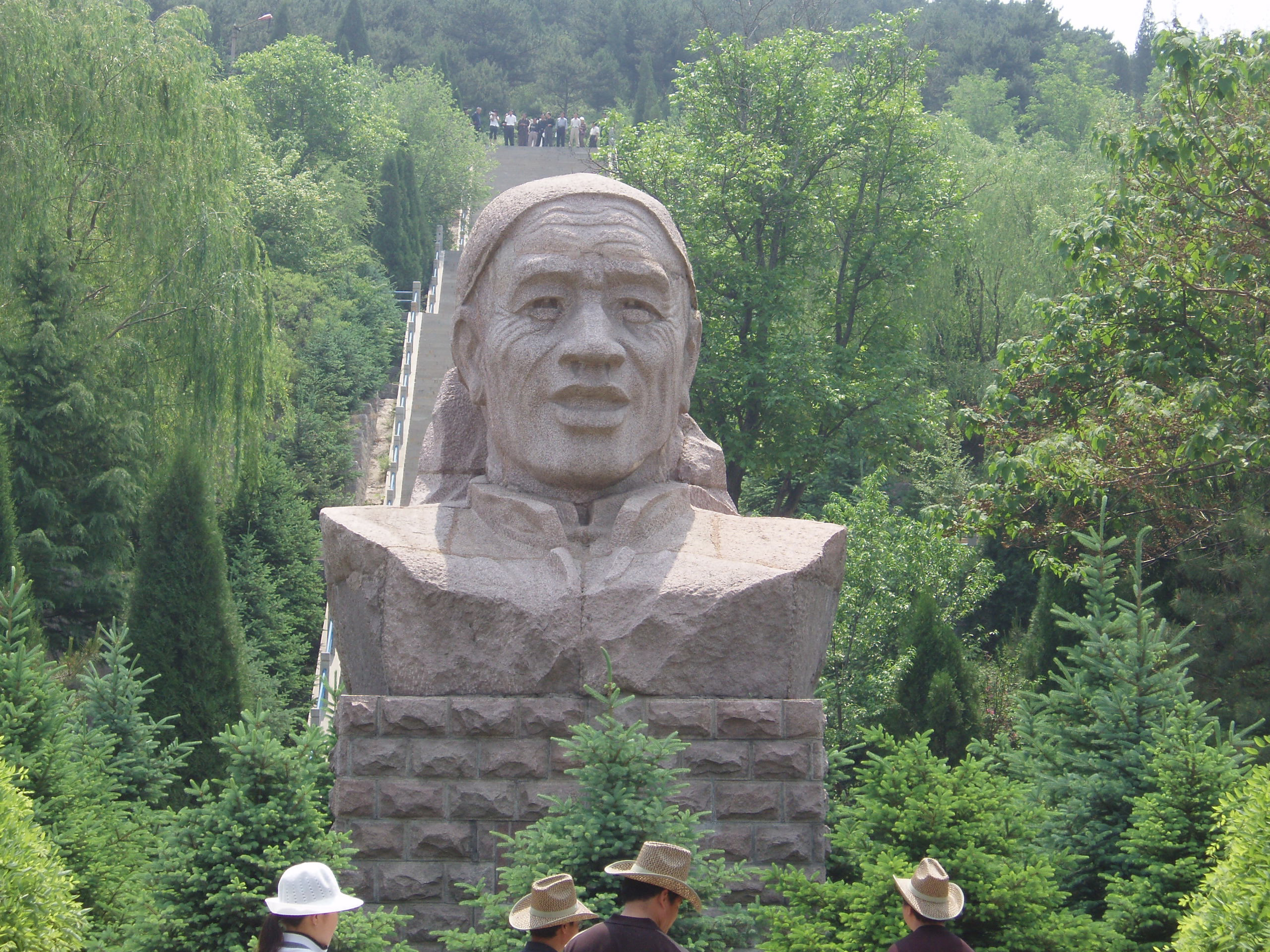
Statue of Chen Yonggui in Dazhai

In 1952 Chen Yonggui was appointed secretary of the CCP branch committee of Dazhai, succeeding Jia Jincai. He led a peasant movement to turn the harsh environment surrounding Dazhai into an environment favourable to agriculture. The plan was a success, and later grain output increased steadily, passing from 237 kg per mu in 1952 to 774 kg per mu in 1962. This progress was brutally halted by a series of natural disasters in 1963, which destroyed 180 acres of arable land and some of the production brigade's buildings. Despite this setback, the brigade refused any help from the state and completed rebuilding efforts in one year. All of this came to the attention of Mao Zedong, who declared that Dazhai was an example to be followed in the field of self-reliance, launching the directive: "Learn from Dazhai in agriculture". In December 1964, while attending the 3rd National People's Congress, Chen Yonggui had dinner with Mao Zedong.

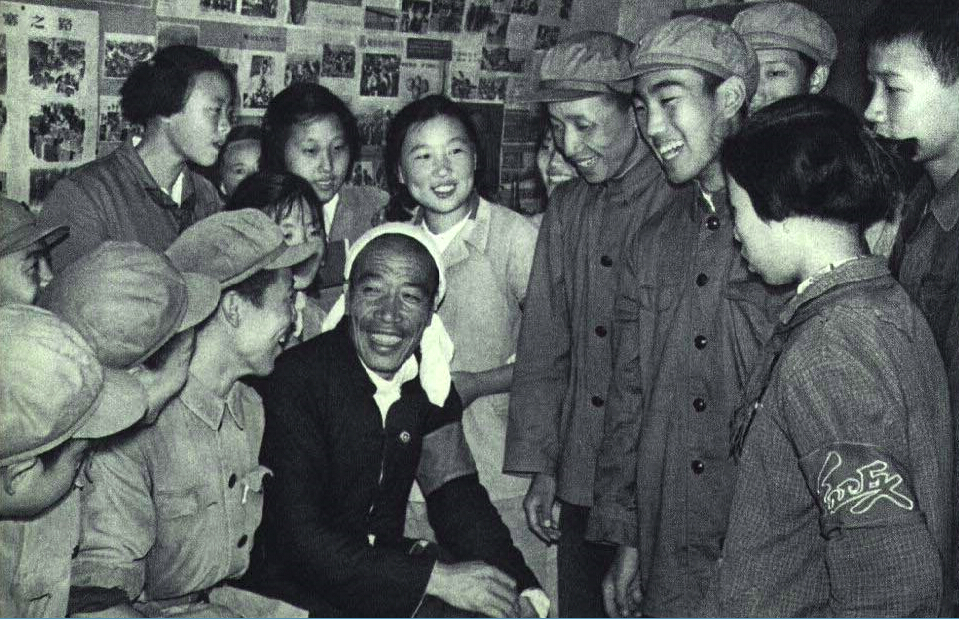
Chen Yonggui getting greeted by Red Guards during the Cultural Revolution in 1966

When the Cultural Revolution began, Dazhai's model was emphasized even more. During a meeting with Zhou Enlai, Chen Yonggui was encouraged to create Dazhai's own Red Guard organization, which was later established under the name "Jinzhong Field Army". He was appointed vice-chairman of the Shanxi Revolutionary Committee in 1967; in the same year, the Cultural Revolution Group approved his "five recommendations" for conducting the Cultural Revolution in rural areas, published in the CCP Central Committee Document No. 339. In 1969 he was elected member of the CCP Central Committee and a secretary of the CCP Shanxi Committee in 1971. He once again gained Mao Zedong's approval in 1972 by firmly opposing Shanxi Revolutionary Committee chairman Xie Zhenhua's request to downgrade the Dazhai production brigade to production team.

=== CCP central leader ===
In 1973 he was elected a member of the CCP Politburo and transferred to Beijing. He was concurrently Secretary of the CCP Xiyang Committee and the CCP Jinzhong Committee. His post as Dazhai Party branch secretary was taken by 22-year-old Guo Fenglian.

In January 1975 Chen Yonggui was appointed a vice premier of the State Council; in March, he led a government delegation to Mexico; in September, he delivered the keynote speech to the First National Conference for Learning From Dazhai in Agriculture, chaired by fellow vice premier and next paramount leader Hua Guofeng. He devoted one third of his time to inspection tours, one third to farm work in Dazhai, and one third to work in Beijing; Mao Zedong approved this programme. Being in charge of agricultural policy, he suggested that Gansu Province adopt the same method employed by Dazhai, but this didn't produce the expected results.

=== Downfall ===
Chen Yonggui was re-elected to the CCP Politburo in 1977 and vice premier in 1978 (in the same year he visited Democratic Kampuchea). Despite this, his views were more and more at odds with Deng Xiaoping's rising authority; as Deng moved to consolidate his position, Chen Yonggui proposed to abolish private plots, calling them the "tail of capitalism". His refusal to approve private plots and carry out the "Seeking truths from facts" campaign (aimed at repudiating the Cultural Revolution) in Dazhai cost him his posts in the party leadership in Jinzhong and Xiyang in 1979; he was dismissed from the State Council in 1980 in a government reshuffle (when Hua Guofeng lost the premiership) and was not reelected as a Central Committee member in 1982.

== Later life and death ==
Chen Yonggui spent the rest of his life as a farm advisor in the eastern suburb of Beijing. He died of lung cancer on 26 March 1986, aged 71.

== Personal life ==
Chen Yonggui married Li Huni, the daughter of a fellow poor peasant, in 1941. Chen Mingzhu was born out of this marriage in 1943. Li Huni died out of cancer in 1965. Chen Yonggui remarried with Song Yuling in 1966. Their son, Chen Mingliang, was born in 1969 but migrated to Australia in 1996.
