= Nanjing Agricultural University =

Public university in Nanjing, China

- 南京农业大学
- Motto: 诚朴勤仁
- Type: Public
- Established: 1902; 124 years ago
- President: Chen Fadi (陈发棣)
- Academic staff: 2,700
- Undergraduates: 17,000
- Postgraduates: 8,500
- Location: Nanjing, Jiangsu, People's Republic of China; 32°01′55″N 118°50′12″E
- Campus: Urban
- Colours: Green
- Website: njau.edu.cn

Nanjing Agricultural University (NAU, 南京农业大学) is a public university in Nanjing, Jiangsu, China. It is affiliated with the Ministry of Education and co-sponsored by the Ministry of Education and the Jiangsu Provincial Government. The university is part of Project 211 and the Double First-Class Construction.

== History ==
The origins of Nanjing Agricultural University can be traced back to the Agriculture Section of Sanjiang Teacher's College (Chinese: 三江师范学堂) in 1902, and its predecessors were the College of Agriculture of the private Jinling University and the College of Agriculture of the National Central University. In 1914, the private Jinling University set up the first four-year agricultural department, the first four-year university of higher agricultural education in China, and in 1930, the agricultural department was expanded to become the College of Agriculture of Jinling University.

In 1949, after the founding of the People's Republic of China, the College of Agriculture of the former private Jinling University was renamed as the College of Agriculture of the public Jinling University, and the College of Agriculture of the former National Central University was renamed as the College of Agriculture of the National University of Nanjing. Wheat genetic breeding experts Jin Shanbao became the first chairman. In the 1960s, the college was identified by the State Council as one of the country's two key agricultural colleges and universities. In January 1972, the school moved to Yangzhou, and the then north of Jiangsu Agricultural College merged with the establishment of Jiangsu Agricultural College. In February 1979, approved by the State Council, Nanjing Agricultural College in the original site of the resumption of schooling, included in the Ministry of Agriculture under the national key universities.

University rankings

Global – Overall
- QS World: 951-1000 (2026)

In July 1984, approved by the Ministry of Education, Nanjing Agricultural College was renamed Nanjing Agricultural University. in December 1998, Nanjing Agricultural University officially entered the national "Project 211" key construction of universities. In February 2000, the university was transferred from the Ministry of Agriculture to the Ministry of Education for direct management.

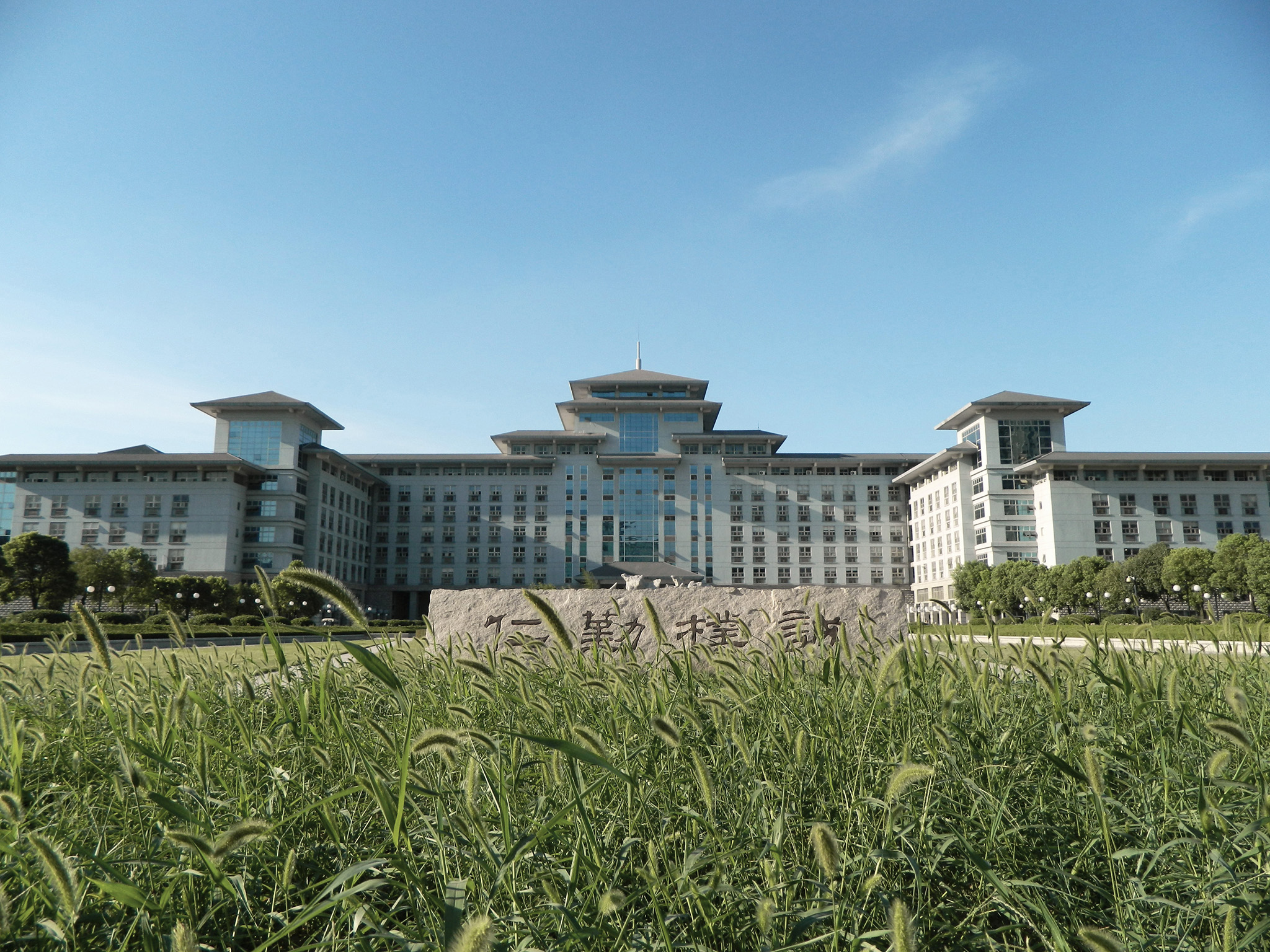
Yifu Hall, the main building of NAU

== Academics ==
=== Faculties and colleges ===
- Faculty of Plant Science
  - College of Agriculture
  - College of Plant Protection
  - College of Horticulture
- Faculty of Animal Science
  - College of Veterinary Medicine
  - College of Animal Science & Technology
  - College of Prataculture College of Aquaculture
- Faculty of Biology and Environment
  - College of Resources & Environmental Sciences
  - College of Life Sciences
- Faculty of Food and Engineering
  - College of Food Science & Technology
  - College of Engineering
  - College of Information Science & Technology
- Faculty of Social Science
  - College of Economics & Management
  - College of Public Administration
  - College of Humanities & Social Sciences
  - College of Finance
  - College of Rural Development
- General education
  - College of Foreign Studies
  - Department of General Education on Political Science
  - Department of Physical Education

=== Research facilities ===
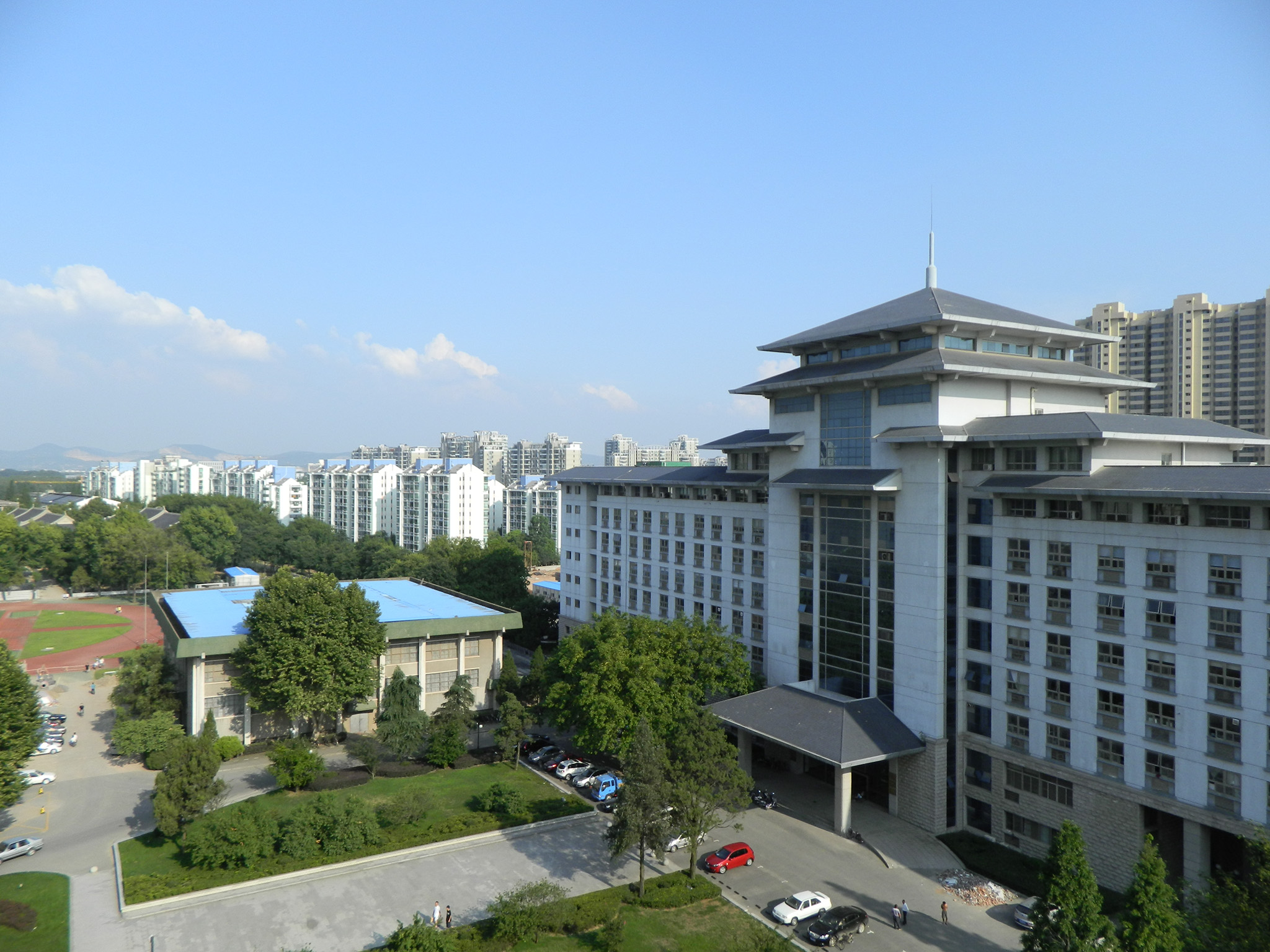
Back of the Yifu Hall

- State Key Laboratory of Crop Genetics and Germplasm Innovation (作物遗传与种质创新国家重点实验室)
- Crop Genetics & Germplasm Enhancement
- Meat Quality and Safety Control
- Soybean Improvement
- Information Agriculture
- National Key Engineering Center for Organic-based Fertilizers

=== NAU journals ===
- Journal of Nanjing Agricultural University
- Chinese Agricultural Education
- Journal of Nanjing Agricultural University (Social Science)
- Animal Husbandry and Veterinary Medicine
- Institution of Chinese Agricultural Civilization
- Horticulture Research
