= Anhui Agricultural University =

Provincial public university in Hefei, Anhui, China

- 安徽农业大学 (Chinese)
- Established: 1928
- President: Xia Tao (夏涛)
- Undergraduates: 20,904
- Postgraduates: 2,861
- Location: Hefei, Anhui, China
- Campus: Urban
- Website: ahau.edu.cn eng.ahau.edu.cn

Chinese name
- Simplified Chinese: 安徽农业大学
- Traditional Chinese: 安徽農業大學
Transcriptions
Standard Mandarin
- Hanyu Pinyin: Ānhuī Nóngyè Dàxué

Anhui Agricultural University (AHAU; 安徽农业大学) is a provincial public university in Hefei, Anhui, China. It is affiliated with the Anhui Provincial Government, and co-sponsored by the Anhui Provincial People's Government, the Ministry of Agriculture and Rural Affairs, and the National Forestry and Grassland Administration.

The university has a major focus on agriculture and forestry.

== History ==
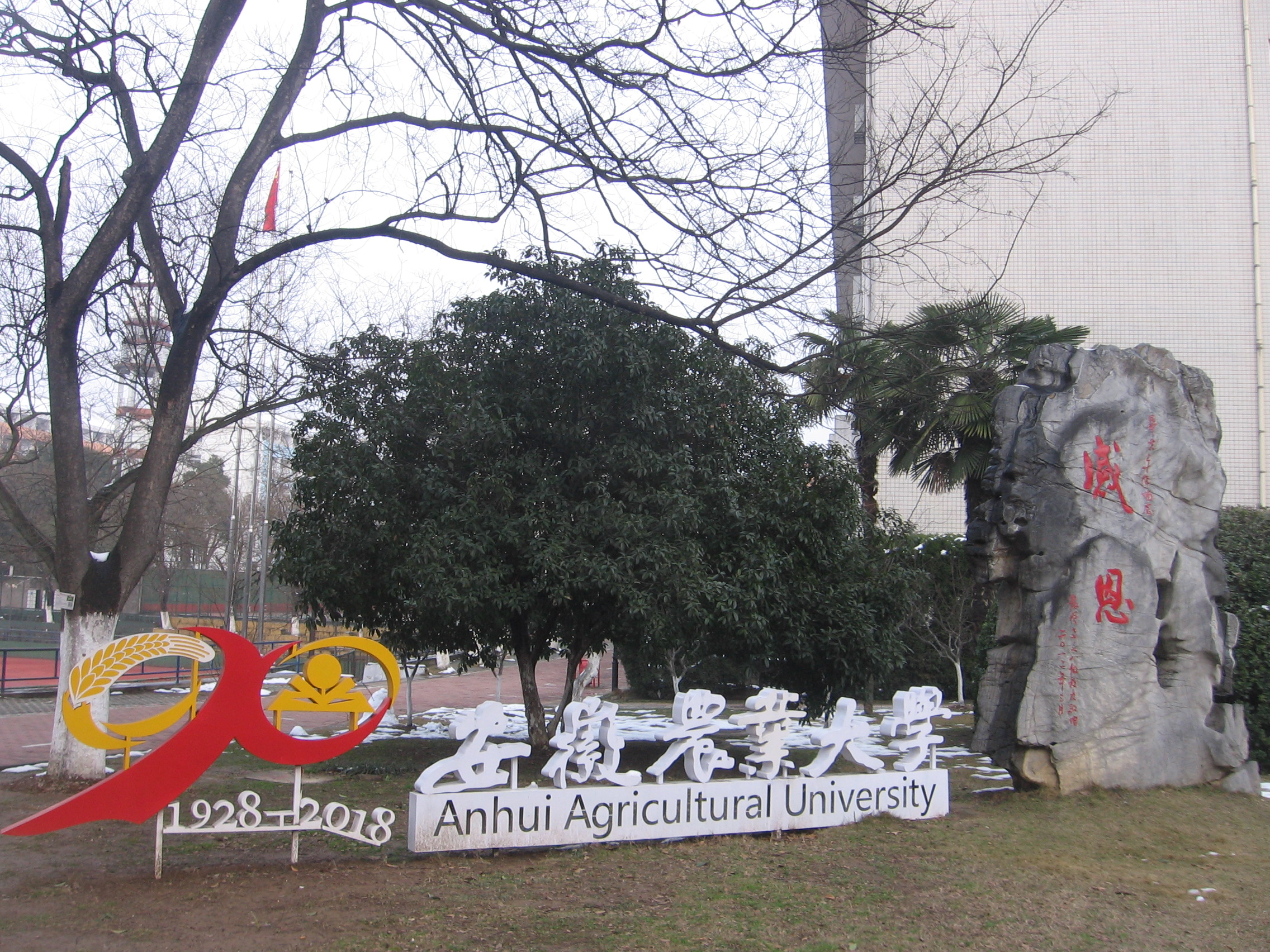
Ninetieth Anniversary of Anhui Agricultural University in 2018

The origin of the university dates back to 1928, when Anhui University was founded in Anqing.

In 1935, AAU started its history as a college of agriculture under Anhui University.

In December 1949, Anhui University moved from Anqing to Wuhu.

In July 1950, July 1952, September 1952, and the summer of 1953, Anhui University conducted three adjustments. After the adjustments, including Anhui University majored in agriculture and forestry professional and specialty of normal school two.

In February 1954, the Agricultural College of Anhui University moved independently to Anhui Agricultural College. It became an independent institution. In April, Anhui Agricultural College moved to Hefei.

In December 1968, Anhui Agricultural College moved to rural education, and split into three campuses: Suxian Zilu lake purple campus, Chuxian campus and Fengyang campus.

In 1970, Anhui Agricultural College recruited the first batch of the worker peasant soldier students. From 1970 to 1977, 2,731 peasants and soldiers students enrolled.

In October 1978, Anhui Agricultural College moved back to Hefei.

In 1995, Anhui Agricultural College changed its name to Anhui Agricultural University.

== Schools ==
- School of Animal Science
- School of Agronomy
- School of Continuing Education (SCE)
- School of Economics and Management
- School of Engineering
- School of Foreign Languages
- School of Forestry and Landscape
- School of Horticulture
- School of Humanities and Social Sciences
- School of Information and Computer Science
- School of Life Science
- School of Textile Engineering
- School of Plant Protection
- School of Resources and Environment (SRE)
- School of Natural Sciences
- School of Tea and Food Science
- School of Marxism

== Research ==
AAU has one national key discipline in process and 19 provincial key disciplines.

AAU has one state key laboratory, one national engineering laboratory, one international joint laboratory, and 37 provincial key laboratories, two provincial "2011" collaborative innovation centers, one provincial key think tank, and one provincial research institute of industrial technology.

== See also ==
- List of universities in China
