= Chinese Academy of Agricultural Sciences =

Research institute in Beijing, China

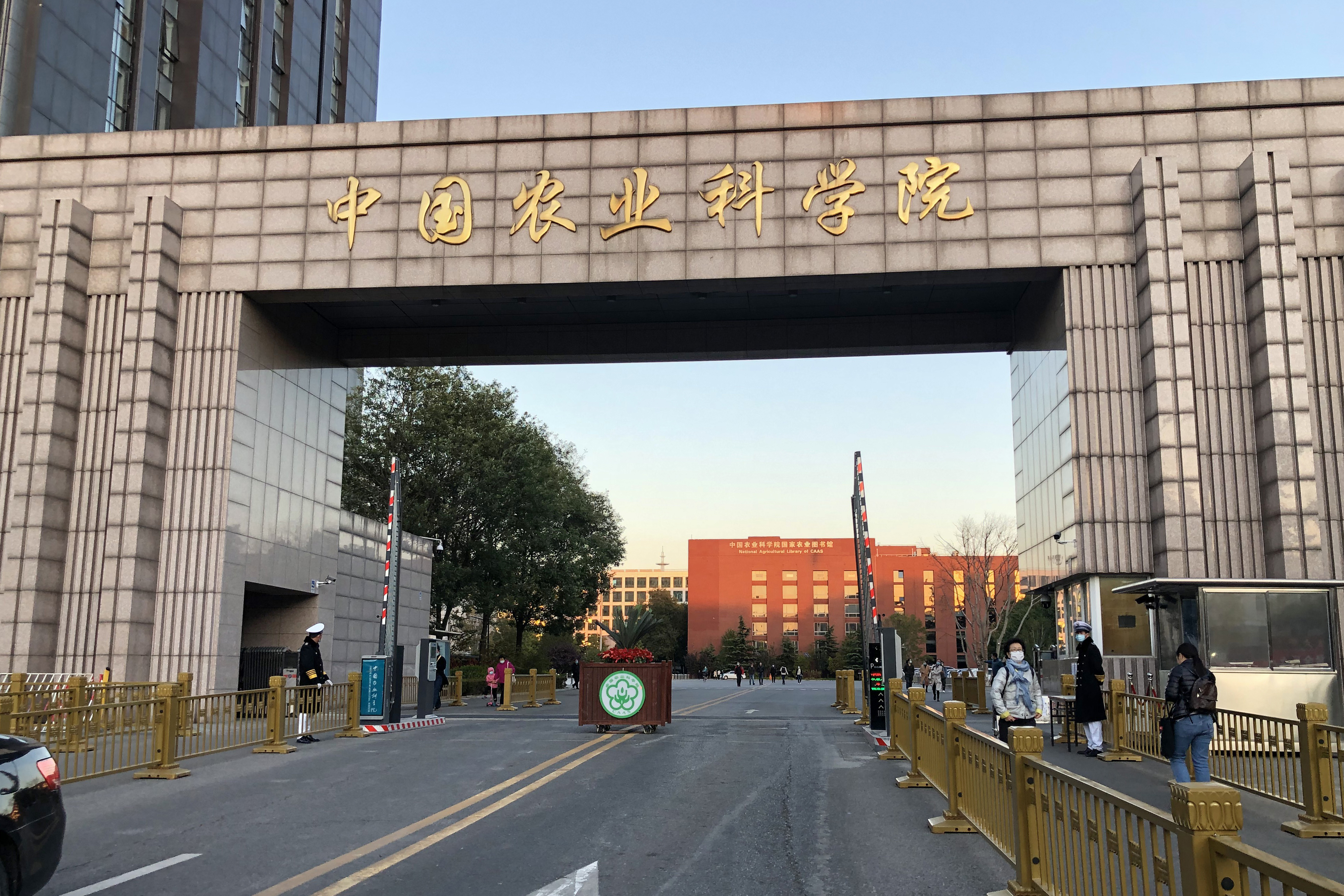

Research institution overview
- Formed: March 1, 1957; 68 years ago
- Jurisdiction: Ministry of Agriculture and Rural Affairs
- Headquarters: Beijing, China; 39°58′02″N 116°20′04″E
- President responsible: Tang Huajun
- Website: www.caas.cn

Chinese name
- Traditional Chinese: 中國農業科學院
- Simplified Chinese: 中国农业科学院
Transcriptions
Standard Mandarin
- Hanyu Pinyin: Zhōngguó Nóngyè Kēxuéyuàn

The Chinese Academy of Agricultural Sciences (CAAS; Chinese: 中国农业科学院) is the Chinese national agricultural scientific research organization.

It was established in 1957 in Beijing and oversees 45 institutes. Thirty-six are direct affiliates, nine institutes are co-hosted together with local governments or universities. It has more than 5,000 professional employees.

The Academy building contains offices of several Chinese policy institutions such as the China Association for the Promotion of International Agricultural Cooperation (CAPIAC, 中国农业国际合作促进会) established in 1998. One of CAPIAC's branches is the International Cooperation Committee for Animal Welfare (ICCAW), established in 2011. In 2017, ICCAW hosted a farm animal welfare conference together with UN Food and Agriculture Organization, RSPCA, Compassion in World Farming, the U.S. Meat Export Federation and the U.S. National Pork Board.

In 2023, CAAS and Tencent announced a partnership to establish a Digital Seed Bank at the Tencent Science and Technology Museum. The Digital Seed Bank includes digital displays of germplasm resources preserved at the National Crop Genebank of China, along with seed-storage and breeding technologies.

== List of institutes ==
- Beijing branch
  - Crop Sciences Institute
  - Plant Protection Institute
  - Vegetable and Flower Research Institute
  - Institute of Agricultural Environment and Sustainable Development
  - Beijing Institute of Animal Husbandry and Veterinary Medicine
  - Bee Research Institute
  - Feed Research Institute
  - Agricultural Products Processing Research Institute
  - Institute of Biotechnology
  - Institute of Agricultural Economics and Development
  - Institute of Agricultural Resources and Agricultural Regional Planning
  - Agricultural Information Research Institute
  - Institute of Agricultural Quality Standards and Testing Technology
  - Institute of Food and Nutrition Development, Ministry of Agriculture and Rural Affairs
  - China Agricultural Science and Technology Press
- Outside of Beijing
  - Farmland Irrigation Research Institute
  - Rice Research Institute
  - Cotton Research Institute
  - Oil Crops Research Institute
  - Hemp Research Institute
  - Fruit Research Institute
  - Zhengzhou Fruit Research Institute
  - Tea Research Institute
  - Harbin Veterinary Research Institute
  - Lanzhou Veterinary Research Institute
  - Lanzhou Institute of Husbandry and Pharmaceutical Sciences
  - Shanghai Veterinary Research Institute
  - Grassland Research Institute
  - Specialty Research Institute
  - Environmental Protection Research and Monitoring Institute
  - Biogas Science Institute
  - Nanjing Institute of Agricultural Mechanization
  - Tobacco Research Institute
  - Shenzhen Agricultural Genome Research Institute
  - Urban Agriculture Research Institute
- Co-hosted institutes
  - Citrus Research Institute
  - Beet Research Institute
  - Sericulture Research Institute
  - China Agricultural Heritage Research Office
  - Buffalo Institute
  - Grassland Ecological Research Institute
  - Poultry Research Institute
  - Sweet Potato Research Institute
