= Dǒng =

Chinese surname

- Romanization: Dong, Tung
- Language: Chinese, Korean

Origin
- Origin: China
- Meaning: "To Supervise/Manage"

Other names
- Anglicisations: Dong, Tung

Dong (Chinese: 董; pinyin: Dǒng; Wade–Giles: Tung³; Jyutping: Dung2; Cantonese Yale: Dúng) is a surname of Chinese origin. Dong is from a Chinese character that also means "to supervise" or "to administer." The story goes that in the 23rd century BC, an adviser to the Emperor Shun was conferred this surname due to his ability to supervise and train dragons. In 2019, it was the 35th most common surname in mainland China, shared by 6,770,000 people or 0.510% of the population.

== Origin ==
Dǒng origins from:

- Zhu Rong (祝融) of Ji (己) family received the surname Dong (董) on the territory of the State of Chu.
- Dongfu (董父) was a descendant of the ruler Shuan (叔安) in Chifeng, he married a daughter of Emperor Yao, and used the surname Dong (董).
- During the Zhou dynasty, someone of government public official received the surname Dong with Public Office name.
- During the Ming dynasty, the Ming government gave the surname Dong (董) to the leader of the Jurchen.

== People ==
People with the surname Dong (董) include:

=== Historical figures ===
- Dong Chang (董昌; died 896), Tang dynasty warlord
- Dong Cheng (董承; died 200), Han dynasty general
- Dong Feng (董奉; c. 200–280), Eastern Han physician
- Dong Fuxiang (董福祥; 1839–1908), Qing dynasty general
- Dong Gao (董誥; 1740–1818), Qing dynasty politician, scholar, painter, calligrapher
- Dong He (董和; died 221), Shu Han official
- Dong Jin (董晉; 724–799), Tang dynasty official and general
- Dong Qichang (董其昌; 1555–1636), Ming dynasty art theorist, calligrapher, painter, politician
- Dong Xi (董襲; died 217), Han dynasty general
- Dong Xian (董賢; 22 BC–1 BC), Han dynasty politician
- Dong Xiaowan (董小宛; 1624–1651), Ming dynasty courtesan and poet
- Dong Yi (董翳; died 204 BC), Qin dynasty general
- Dong Yuan (董源; c. 934–c. 962), Southern Tang painter
- Dong Zhao (董昭; 156–236), Cao Wei official
- Dong Zhongshu (董仲舒; 179–104 BC), Han dynasty philosopher, politician, writer
- Dong Zhuo (董卓; c. 140s–192), Han dynasty general and warlord
- Empress Dowager Dong (董太后; d.189), Han Dynasty Empress Dowager and Grand Empress Dowager, Mother of Emperor Ling of Han

=== Modern figures ===
==== Dong ====
- Adam Dong (董星宇; born 1994), Chinese-born Canadian badminton player
- Dong Biwu (董必武; 1886–1975), former acting Chairman of the People's Republic of China
- Dong Chao (董超; born 1985), Chinese para sport shooter, Paralympic gold medalist
- Dong Chao (董超; born 1988), Chinese fencer
- Dong Chen (董晨; born 1967), Chinese immunologist
- Dong Cheng (董程; born 1986), Chinese boxer
- Dong Chengpeng (董成鹏; born 1982), Chinese actor, film director, producer, screenwriter
- Dong Chuncai (董纯才; 1905–1990), Chinese educator and politician
- Dong Chunhua (董春华; born 1990), Chinese baseball player
- Dong Chunyu (董春雨; born 1991), Chinese footballer
- Dong Dong (董栋; born 1989), Chinese trampoline gymnast, Olympic gold medalist
- Dong Erdan (董尔丹; born 1959), Chinese physician
- Dong Fang (董芳; born 1981), Chinese former badminton player
- Dong Fangxiao (董芳霄; born 1986), Chinese retired international gymnast
- Dong Fangzhuo (董方卓; born 1985), Chinese former professional footballer
- Dong Guangping (董广平; born 1958), Chinese human rights activist
- Dong Guishan (董贵山; born 1946), Chinese retired general
- Dong Guojian (董国建; born 1987), Chinese long-distance runner
- Dong Hairong (董海荣), Chinese transportation engineer
- Han Dong (董晗鵬; born 1977), Canadian politician
- Dong Hao (董浩; born 1956), Chinese former host, actor, painter
- Dong Hong (董宏; born 1953), Chinese former politician
- Dong Hongyun (董洪运; born 1956), Chinese former politician
- Dong Huibo (董慧博; born 1989), Chinese former competitive pair skater
- Dong Jiahong (董家鸿; born 1960), Chinese surgeon
- Dong Jialin (董佳林; born 1993), Chinese footballer
- Dong Jian (董健; 1936–2019), Chinese literary scholar
- Dong Jianwu (董健吾; 1891–1970), Chinese Episcopalian priest
- Dong Jie (董洁; born 1980), Chinese actress and dancer
- Dong Jie (董洁; born 1998), Chinese swimmer, Olympic gold medalist
- Dong Jingwei (董经纬; born 1963), Chinese politician and intelligence officer
- Dong Jiong (董炯; born 1973), Chinese badminton player, Olympic silver medalist
- Joanna Dong (董姿彦; born 1981), Singaporean singer and actress
- Dong Jun (董军; born 1961), Chinese admiral
- Dong Junshu (董君舒; born 1949), Chinese politician
- Kui Dong (董葵; born 1966), Chinese-American composer, musician, teacher
- Dong Le'an (董乐安; born 1982), Chinese modern pentathlete
- Dong Leshan (董乐山; 1924–1999), Chinese author and translator
- Dong Mingzhu (董明珠; born 1954), Chinese businesswoman
- Dong Qing (董卿; born 1973), Chinese television host
- Dong Shaoming (董绍明; born 1962), Chinese engineer
- Dong Sicheng (董思成; stage name Winwin, born 1997), Chinese singer and actor, member of boy bands NCT and WayV
- Taishan Dong (董建军; born 1988), Chinese professional boxer
- Dong Tichen (董悌忱; 1931–1966), Chinese anthropologist and educator
- Dong Tonghe (董同龢; 1911–1963), Chinese linguist
- Dong Wenfei (董文飞; born 1990), Chinese Sanda fighter and kickboxer
- Dong Wenjing (董文静; born 1998), Chinese badminton player
- Xinnian Dong (董欣年; born 1959), Chinese-American biologist
- XinQi Dong (董新奇), American physician
- Dong Xiaojun (董晓军; born 1962), Chinese diplomat
- Dong Xiaoqin (董晓琴; born 1983), Chinese long-distance runner
- Dong Xiwen (董希文; 1914–1973), Chinese painter
- Dong Xuan (董璇; born 1979), Chinese actress and singer
- Dong Xue (董雪; born 1986), Chinese biathlete
- Dong Xuesheng (董学升; born 1989), Chinese former professional footballer
- Dong Yang (董阳; born 1983), Chinese footballer
- Dong Yaoqiong (董瑶琼; born 1989), Chinese dissident
- Dong Yifan (董一凡; born 1992), Chinese footballer
- Dong Yinchu (董寅初; 1915–2009), Chinese politician
- Dong Ying (董瑛; born 1972), Chinese sprint canoeist
- Dong Yingjie (董英杰; 1897–1961), Chinese martial artist, leading master of tai chi
- Dong Yong (董勇; born 1968), Chinese actor
- Dong Youngbae (董永培; 동영배; stage name Taeyang, born 1988), South Korean singer, member of boy band BigBang
- Dong Yu (董钰), Chinese gymnast
- Dong Yu (董宇; born 1994), Chinese footballer
- Dong Yueqian (董越千; 1914–1978), Chinese diplomat
- Dong Yuhui (董宇輝; born 1993), Chinese internet celebrity
- Dong Yuping (董玉萍; born 1963), Chinese retired athlete
- Dong Yuyu (董郁玉; born 1962), Chinese former journalist and editor
- Dong Zhao (董釗; 1902–1977), Kuomintang general
- Dong Zhen (董贞; born 1986), Chinese singer-songwriter
- Dong Zhen (董震; born 1977), Chinese retired artistic gymnast
- Dong Zhi (董智; born 1981), Chinese para archer, Paralympic silver medalist
- Dong Zhiming (董枝明, 1937–2024), Chinese vertebrate paleontologist
- Dong Zhiyuan (董志远; born 1989), Chinese former footballer
- Dong Zijian (董子健; born 1993), Chinese actor
- Dong Zuobin (董作賓; 1895–1963), Chinese archaeologist

==== Tong ====
- Chiling Tong (董繼玲; born 1958), American politician
- Hollington Tong (董顯光; 1887–1971), Chinese journalist and diplomat
- Tong Jong-ho (董正浩; 동정호; born 1956), North Korean politician
- Kaity Tong (董恺悌; born 1947), Chinese-born American broadcast journalist
- Tong Yang-tze (董陽孜; born 1942), Taiwanese artist

==== Tung ====
- Betty Tung (董趙洪娉; born 1935), Hong Kong philanthropist
- Bill Tung (董驃; 1933–2006), Hong Kong actor and horse racing commentator
- Tung Chao-yung (董兆榮; 1912–1982), Chinese shipping magnate
- Tung Chee-chen (董建成; born 1942), Hong Kong billionaire businessman
- Tung Chee-hwa (董建華; 1937–2026), the first Chief Executive of Hong Kong
- Tung Ching Chang (董景昌; 1916–1975), Chinese acupuncturist
- Ho-Pin Tung (董荷斌; born 1982), Dutch-Chinese racing driver
- Tung Hsiang-lung (董翔龍; born 1952), Taiwanese military official and retired admiral
- Tung Hu Ling (董虎嶺; 1917–1992), Chinese-American martial artist, master of tai chi
- Kelly Tung (董健莉; born 1981), Hong Kong politician
- Tung Kuo-yu (董國猷), Taiwanese diplomat
- Lola Tung (董丽华; born 2002), American actress and model
- Monie Tung (董敏莉; born 1980), Hong Kong actress, entertainer, singer
- Tung Pao-cheng (董保城; born 1951), Taiwanese legal scholar and politician
- Tung Soo Hua (董素华; born 1974), Singaporean news anchor and presenter
- Stephen Tung (董瑋; born 1954), Hong Kong action choreographer, actor, film director

== See also ==
- List of common Chinese surnames
