= Wang Guangfa =

Chinese respiratory expert at Peking University First Hospital

- 王广发
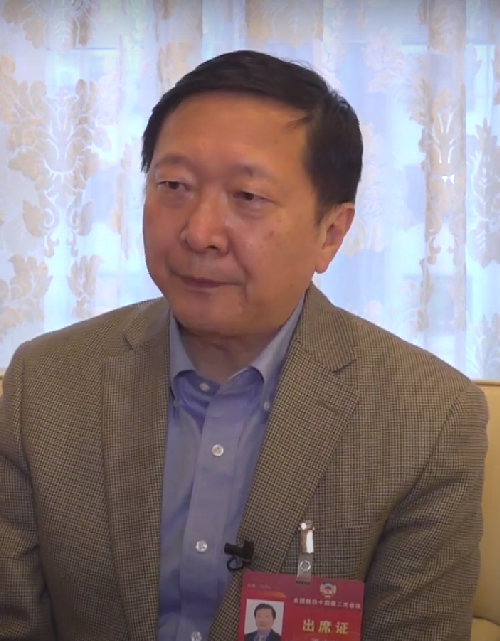
- Born: 1964 (age 61–62)
- Education: Beijing Medical University; Jichi Medical University; Peking University
- Scientific career
- Fields: respiratory medicine, critical care medicine
- Workplaces: Peking University First Hospital

Chinese name
- Traditional Chinese: 王廣發
- Simplified Chinese: 王广发
Transcriptions
Standard Mandarin
- Hanyu Pinyin: Wáng Guǎngfā

Wang Guangfa (Chinese: 王广发, born 1964) is a Chinese physician. He is a respiratory expert at Peking University First Hospital.

== Career ==
Wang entered Beijing Medical University in 1981, majoring in medical, where he graduated in 1987 and earned a bachelor's degree. Between 1995 and 1996 he was studied in Jichi Medical University, majoring in respiratory medicine. Later, he earned a master's degree in Peking University in 2001, and doctor's degree in 2006.

Since 1998 he started working in Peking University First Hospital. During SARS Outbreak, he served as the chief examiner and expert group leader of SARS at Peking University First Hospital, responsible for SARS treatment of the hospital.

In January 2020, a "unknown cause pneumonia" (later known as COVID-19) outbreak in Wuhan. Wang was part of National Health Commission's expert group and visited Wuhan. On 10 January, Wang told China Central Television (CCTV) that "There was uncertainty regarding the human-to-human transmission" and the outbreak was "preventable and controllable". However, he was infected by COVID-19 and hospitalized on 21 January. On 30 January, he recovered and discharged from the hospital.
