= Dong Erdan =

Chinese physician

- Born: March 1959 (age 67); China
- Education: Inner Mongolia Medical University; Beijing Medical University
- Scientific career
- Fields: Cardiovascular disease
- Workplaces: Peking University Third Hospital

Chinese name
- Traditional Chinese: 董爾丹
- Simplified Chinese: 董尔丹
Transcriptions
Standard Mandarin
- Hanyu Pinyin: Dǒng Ěrdān

Dong Erdan (Chinese: 董尔丹; born March 1959) is a Chinese physician who is a researcher at Peking University Third Hospital.

== Biography ==
Dong was born in March 1959. After the resumption of National College Entrance Examination, he graduated from Inner Mongolia Medical University in 1983. He obtained his doctor's degree from Beijing Medical University in 1994. He was a postdoctoral fellow at the University of Rochester between 1995 and 1999. He joined the Peking University Third Hospital at the end of 2017.

== Honours and awards ==
- November 22, 2019 Member of the Chinese Academy of Engineering (CAE)
