= Piety (disambiguation) =

Piety is a virtue which may include religious devotion or spirituality, such as:

- popular piety

Piety may also refer to:

- Piety (film), 2022 Spanish Argentine film
- Temple of Piety, sanctuary in Ancient Rome
- Piety Street Recording, recording studio in New Orleans, US
- Marilyn Gaye Piety, American philosopher
- The PIETY Study, U.S. longitudinal study of Chinese families
