= Li Xiaolai =

Chinese billionaire Bitcoin investor

Li Xiaolai (born 1971 or 1972) is a Chinese billionaire and bitcoin investor known for founding Chinese venture capital firm Bitfund. He has been described in the press as "China's richest Bitcoin billionaire" and had an estimated net worth of ¥7 billion in 2018.

== Career ==
Li was an English test prep teacher at New Oriental from 2001 to 2008. He began investing in bitcoin and advocating for cryptocurrencies in 2011. Li purchased 2,100 bitcoins, which was at the time valued at USD$1, before buying an additional 100,000 bitcoins six months later. He subsequently branched out into mining bitcoin, and achieved a net worth of $100 million before the 2013 Bitcoin crash. Li raised a $200 million ICO in China during July 2017, two months before the Chinese government banned initial coin offerings.

Li founded the cryptocurrency venture capital Bitfund in 2013. In 2018, Li was appointed co-chief executive of the Hangzhou blockchain investor Grandshores Technology Group, as part of a project to create a Hong Kong-based stablecoin.

In July 2018, a profanity laden rant was leaked in which Li allegedly described leading cryptocurrency exchanges as "cheaters" and "scams". In September 2018, Li announced that he would no longer be investing in cryptocurrency projects, and that investors should discount rumors that he was involved in any future blockchain projects.
