= Qiao Jie =

- 乔杰
- Born: January 2, 1964 (age 62); Harbin, Heilongjiang, China
- Education: Peking University Health Science Center
- Scientific career
- Fields: Reproductive medicine Reproductive endocrinology
- Workplaces: Peking University Third Hospital

Chinese name
- Traditional Chinese: 喬傑
- Simplified Chinese: 乔杰
Transcriptions
Standard Mandarin
- Hanyu Pinyin: Qiáo Jié

Qiao Jie (Chinese: 乔杰; born January 2, 1964) is a Chinese obstetrician, reproductive physician and biologist. She is an academician of the Chinese Academy of Engineering (CAE) and currently president of Peking University Third Hospital. She is also director of the National Clinical Research Center on Obstetrics & Gynecology, president of China Women Doctors' Association and chair for the Reproductive Medical Society of Chinese Medical Doctor Association.

== Biography ==
Qiao was born in Harbin, Heilongjiang, on January 2, 1964. She holds a bachelor's degree in medical science from Peking University Health Science Center, and master's and doctor's degrees from the Peking University Third Hospital, all in obstetrics and gynaecology. After she got her master's degree, she worked as an obstetrician at the hospital. She carried out postdoctoral research at the Stanford University Medical Center in September 2002. She served two briefly separate terms as a visiting scholar at the Queen Mary Hospital from September 1996 to March 1997 and from October 1997 to November 1997. In October 1997 she was promoted to associate professor of Peking University Third Hospital, and was promoted to full professor in June 2001. Beginning in October 2000, she served in several administrative positions at the hospital, including director of Obstetrics and Gynecology, director of Reproductive Medicine Center, and deputy party chief of the hospital. She has been president of the hospital since May 2012.

On 1 February 2020, Qiao left for Wuhan with a team of medical workers from Beijing to help combat the Wuhan coronavirus epidemic.

== Works ==
- 妇产科学 [Gynaecology and Obstetrics] (in Chinese). Beijing: People's Medical Publishing House. 2014. ISBN 9787117188494.
- 黄体支持与孕激素补充专家共识及解读 [Consensus Interpretation on Luteal Phase Support and Progesterone Supplement] (in Chinese). Beijing: People's Medical Publishing House. 2017. ISBN 9787117239653.
- 辅助生育技术促排卵药物治疗共识 [Expert Consensus Statement for Ovulation Stimulation in Assisted Reproductive Technology] (in Chinese). Beijing: People's Medical Publishing House. 2016. ISBN 9787117213196.
- 体外受精胚胎移植技术实施指南 [Guidelines for in Vitro Fertilization and Embryo Transfer Technology] (in Chinese). Beijing: People's Medical Publishing House. 2017. ISBN 9787117240208.
- 生育力保护与生殖储备 [Fertility Preservation] (in Chinese). Beijing: Peking University Press. 2013. ISBN 9787565906916.
- 生殖医学微创手术学 [Minimally Invasive Surgery in Reproductive Medicine] (in Chinese). Beijing: Peking University Press. 2012. ISBN 9787565903359.
- 生殖内分泌疾病诊断与治疗 [Reproductive Endocrine Diseases: Diagnosis and Management] (in Chinese). Beijing: Peking University Press. 2013. ISBN 9787565904608.

== Translations ==
- Roger P. Smith (2007). Netter's Obstetrics, Gynecology and Women's Health (in Chinese). Beijing: People's Medical Publishing House. ISBN 9787117084444.
- Elizabeth Stewart; Janie Tingson (2018). Mayo Clinic: Guide to Fertility and Conception (in Chinese). Beijing: Beijing Science and Technology Press. ISBN 9787530490976.
- Jerome F. Strauss; Robert L. Barberis (2020). Reproductive Endocrinology (in Chinese). Beijing: Science Press. ISBN 9787030594747.

== Honours and awards ==
- 2008 National Science Fund for Distinguished Young Scholars
- 2009 State Science and Technology Progress Award (Second Class)
- 2010 "Chang Jiang Scholar" (or " Yangtze River Scholar")
- 2011 State Science and Technology Progress Award (Second Class)
- 2011 Science and Technology Progress Award of the Ho Leung Ho Lee Foundation
- 2017 State Science and Technology Progress Award (Second Class)
- November 2017 Academician of the Chinese Academy of Engineering (CAE)
- 2018 the 10th Tan Jiazhen Life Science Award
- 2021 Asian Scientist 100, Asian Scientist
