= Yubo Ruan =

Chinese entrepreneur (born 1996)

- 阮宇博
- Born: October 14, 1996 (age 30); Beijing
- Occupation: CEO of 8 Decimal Capital

Yubo Ruan (Chinese: 阮宇博), born in Beijing in 1996, is a tech entrepreneur and venture capitalist. He is the founder and CEO of 8 Decimal Capital, a venture capital investment firm focusing on early stage fintech, and Parallel Finance, a decentralized finance (DeFi) platform on multiple blockchains valued at $500 million.

== Early life ==
In high school, Ruan started his first company Alisimba Technologies in Beijing, China while winning 13 invention awards and five patents. Alisimba was acquired by TopHacker Consulting Group in 2015.

== Career ==
From 2008 to 2012, Ruan developed and upgraded the smart piggy bank system.

In 2017, he served as the co-founder of Skylight Investment, backed by New Oriental (NYSE: EDU) and Taiyou Fund.

In 2017, he launched his second VC fund 8 Decimal Capital with an AUM of over $60 million.
