= Jiangyin Senior High School =

School in Jiangyin, China

Jiangyin Senior High School (Chinese: 江苏省江阴高级中学) was first established as Jiyang Academy (Chinese: 暨阳书院) in 1738. It is now located on Shengang street of Jiangyin in Jiangsu Province. Gu Jixiang is the headmaster of the school. Jiangyin Senior High School is divided into three parts —— senior high, junior high and an experimental school. It covers a total area of 150,000 m^{2}. There are 140 teaching classes and almost 8000 students in the school. It also owns a team of nearly 200 senior teachers. The concept of teaching in Jiangyin Senior High School is "laying a solid basis for the lifelong development of every student". And the objective of cultivating students is "to be a pacemaker". School motto is called "What have you done today" (Chinese: 今日何成). Its school ethos is "be patriotic, be honest, be enterprising". Jiangyin Senior High school plays an important role in establishing the first education group in Wuxi, which is a platform for sharing education resources.

== Famous Schoolmates ==
- Wu Wenzao (吴文藻)
- Yu Minhong (俞敏洪)
