= Peking University First Hospital =

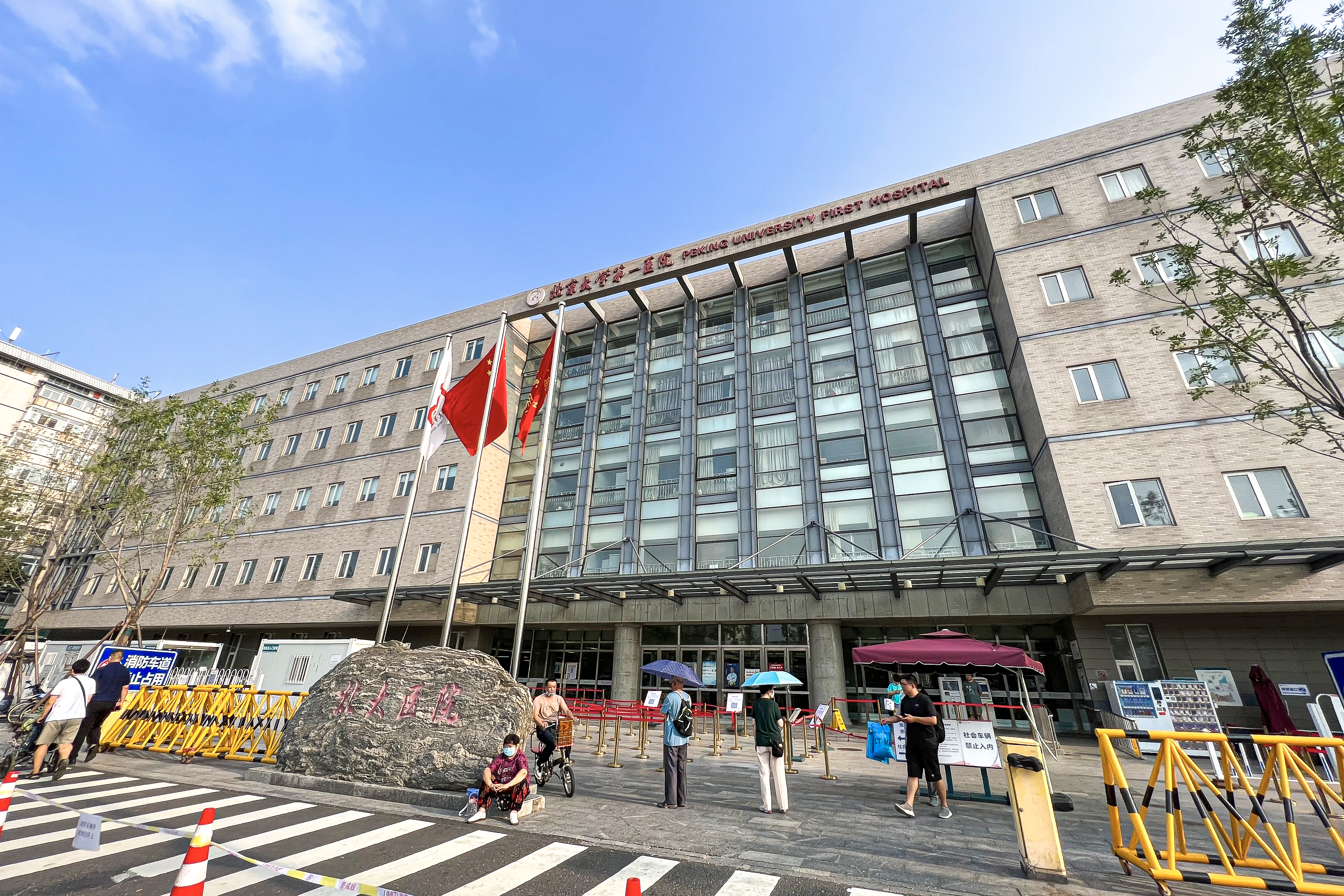
- North Gate of Outpatient Building

Geography
- Location: No. 8 Xishiku Street, Xicheng District, Beijing (Outpatient Department) No. 1 Xi'anmen Street (Women and Children's Hospital, First Inpatient Department) No. 7 Xishiku Street (Second Inpatient Department), China
- Coordinates: 39.93011°N 116.37426°E

Organisation
- Type: comprehensive 3A hospital
- Affiliated university: Peking University

History
- Founded: February 15, 1915

Links
- Website: https://www.pkufh.com/

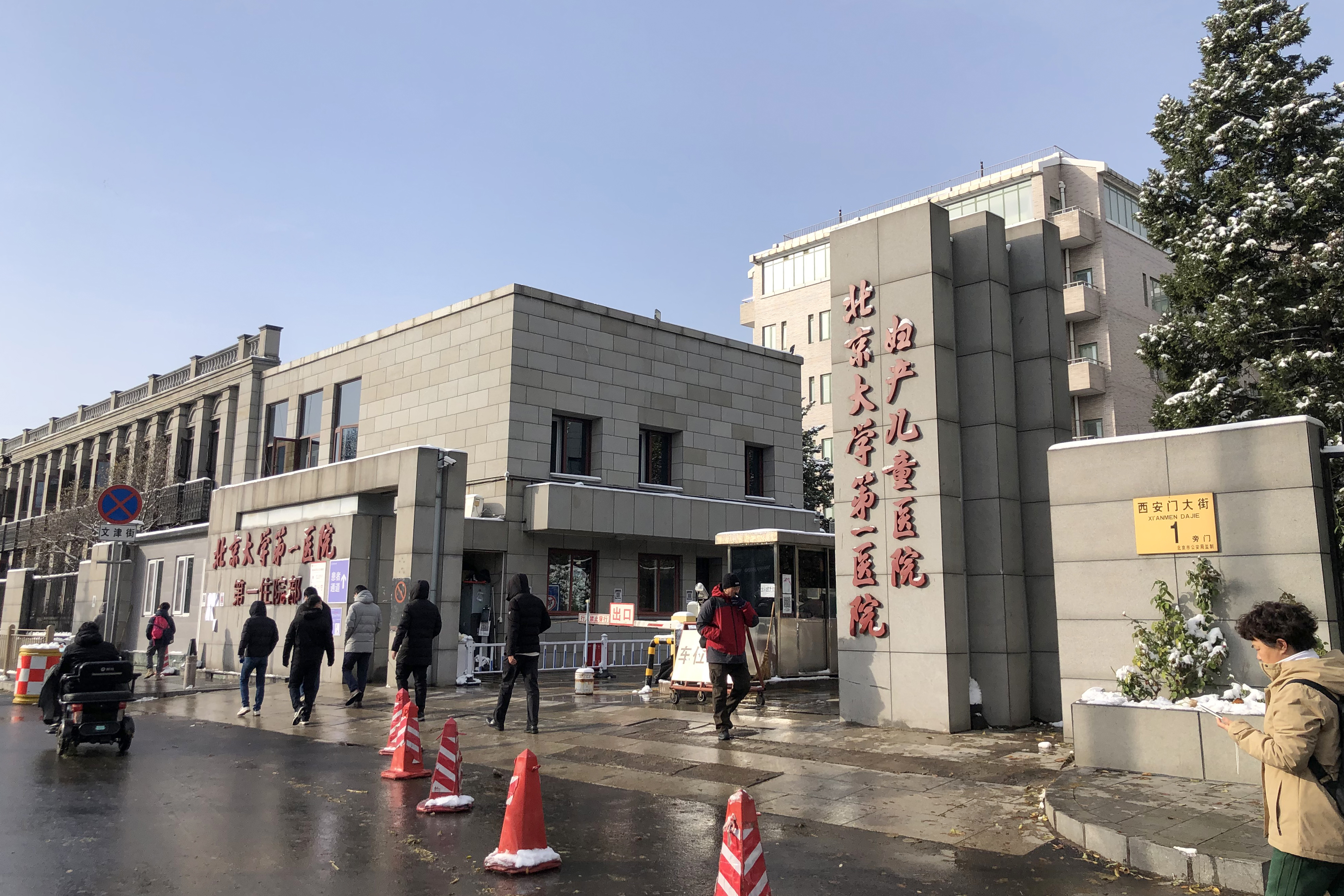
Peking University First Hospital, Women and Children's Hospital

Peking University First Hospital (Chinese: 北京大学第一医院; pinyin: Běijīng Dàxué Dìyī Yīyuàn), also called Beida Hospital (北大医院; Běidà Yīyuàn), is the oldest affiliated hospital of the Peking University Health Science Center. It was founded in 1915 and is now a large comprehensive 3A hospital in China, integrating medical services with teaching and research. Beida Hospital is also the Central Government Designated Hospital.

== History ==
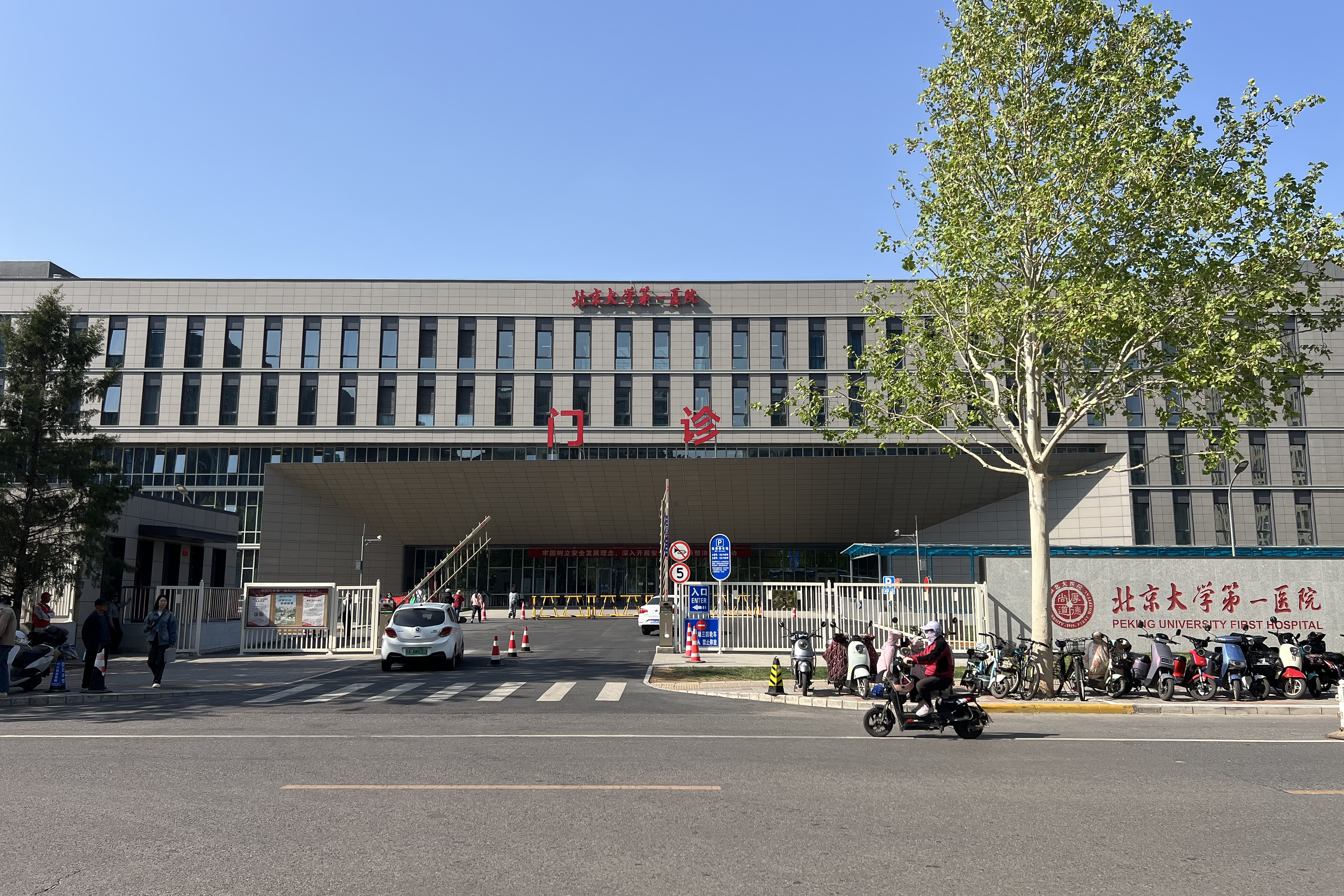
The Daxing branch of Peking University First Hospital located in Gaomidian Street

- On December 30, 1914, the Ministry of Education of the Republic of China approved the establishment of an attached clinic at the Beijing Medical College.
- On February 15, 1915, the clinic was officially established and opened on the same day.
- In 1929, the hospital established the first Pediatrics Teaching and Research Office in China.
- In 1946, Beida Hospital established the first Urology Department in China, and was the first to carry out treatment and research on tropical diseases. In the same year, it was merged into Peking University (also known as Beida) and renamed as "Beida Hospital" (Chinese: 北大医院).
- In 1950, Beida Hospital established the first major of Nephrology in China.
- In 1952, the Peking University Medical School became independent from Peking University and renamed "Peking Medical College", and the hospital was renamed the Affiliated Hospital of Peking Medical College.
- In 1950s, the hospital established the first Cardiovascular Ward in general hospital in China.
- In 1958, it was renamed "Beijing Medical College First Hospital"
- In 1960, the first clinical kidney transplantation operation was successfully carried out by the team of Dr. Wu Jieping at the hospital.
- In 1961, the hospital established the first Pediatric Neurology department in China.
- In 1985, Peking Medical College was renamed "Beijing Medical University", and the hospital "Beijing Medical University First Hospital".
- In 1993, it became a "Grade 3A Hospital" and a WHO "Baby-Friendly Hospital".
- In 2000, Beijing Medical University was reincorporated into Peking University, and the hospital was finally named "Peking University First Hospital".
- In 2008, the hospital was appointed as the Central Government Designated Hospital, i.e., the base for medical care of officials in the CCP Central Committee.
- On April 28, 2012, the new outpatient building of Beida Hospital was completed.
- On December 18, 2023, the Daxing branch of Beida Hospital was completed and put into use.

== Present situation ==
Peking University First Hospital has 36 clinical departments, 11 technological departments, 1 research department, 4 research institutes, 59 wards with 1,805 beds. Over 100,000 patients are admitted, with about 40,000 operations completed per year. Among all the outpatients of the hospital, one third of them are patients with stubborn diseases coming from all over the country.

As the oldest clinical medical school of Peking University, the hospital has an enrollment of more than 300 students from the eight-years doctoral programs, 590 students form master programs, and about 400 undergraduates of the nursing school.

More than 5,300 papers have been published, some appearing in international elite journals including New Engl J Med, Lancet, Blood, Am J Hum Genet, etc.

The hospital has been listed within the top 12 hospitals in Fudan’s China Hospital Ranking for years running.

In addition to the Central Campus in Zhongguancun, there are the Miyun Campus in the north end and Daxing Campus in the south end of Beijing City.

== See also ==
- Peking University Third Hospital
- Peking University Health Science Center
- Peking University
