= The PIETY Study =

U.S. study of Chinese families

- Purpose: To improve the quality of life of the U.S. Chinese population through education, research, and sustainable community-engagement.
- Location: The Chicago area
- Methods: Community-based participatory research
- Official language: English, Mandarin, Cantonese, Taishanese, Teochew
- Main organ: Chinese Health, Aging, and Policy Program, Rush Institute for Healthy Aging, Rush University Medical Center
- Affiliations: Northwestern University, Chinese American Service League, Xilin Asian Community Center
- Budget: NIH funded
- Website: chinesehealthyaging.org/pinestudy.html

The PIETY Study is a U.S. longitudinal study of Chinese families derived from the PINE Study. It is the product of a collaboration between the Chinese Health, Aging, and Policy Program (CHAP) at Rush University, Northwestern University, and many community-based organizations and social service providers. This academic-community partnership is led by XinQi Dong, at Rush University, Melissa A Simon at Northwestern University, and Esther Wong and Bernarda Wong[ at Chinese American Service League.

The goal of the PIETY Study is to better understand the health and well-being of Chinese adult children, and understand the factors impacting the health and aging of Chinese older adults from the perspectives and experiences of adult children.

Since 2011, more than 4,000 face-to-face interviews were conducted. Each interview was personalized according to languages or dialects the participant preferred, including English, Mandarin, Cantonese, Toishanese, and Teochew.

== Background ==
The population of U.S. Chinese adults aged 65 and above has increased four times quicker than the general U.S. older adult population. This rapid growth means there is an increasing demand for elder care within Chinese families. Traditionally, family-oriented values influence the planning and organization of elder care in Chinese families. Filial piety prescribes that adult children are obligated to provide adequate support to their elderly parents. This demand and cultural precedent calls for a better research understanding of Chinese adult children as family caregivers.

Current data collection efforts mostly aggregate Asian as a single category, and therefore social and health data regarding Chinese Americans as specific ethnic group have been scarce. Moreover, conceptual frameworks that have been used in prior research were developed based on Western populations, failing to identify the importance of cultural values within minority populations. In light of those factors, the knowledge of culture and caregiving within Chinese families was rudimentarily understood. Without a full understanding, public health and policy goals remain under-developed to adequately support the family caregiving practices of Chinese adult children. With this mission in mind, the PIETY Study is built to understand the health and well-being of Chinese families in the Chicago metropolitan area.

== Methods ==
The PIETY Study is a community-based participatory population study investigating Chinese adult Children, who lives in the Chicago area. The criteria of participation are:

1. The participants must be 21 of age or above
2. The participants need to have at least one living parent 60 years or older
3. An eligible participant needs to identify himself/ herself as Chinese

Data collection is through face-to-face interviews using the website-based application. The survey is composed of questionnaires and qualitative questions, which capture adult children's perspectives on the topics regarding filial piety and caregiving.

== Findings ==
=== Socio-demographic profile ===
- The average age of the study participants is 48 (range: 22-76), with nearly 70% older than age 40; 66% are female and 81% are married.
- Nearly seven in ten (66%) of the participants have a high school education or less.
- Over 25% of the participants fall below the federal poverty line. Only 26% of the participants can speak English.

=== Health ===
- Four in ten participants (40%) rated their general health status as fair or poor.
- Overall, 20% of the participants live with one medical condition, 8% live with two conditions, and 5% live with three conditions or more.
- The average number of visits to physician is 4 times per year.

=== Intergenerational solidarity ===
- One third of participants live with their parents in the same house. Many of them have daily face-to-face contact with their father (47%) and mother (27%).
- Adult children are more likely to perceive their fathers care about them compared to mothers (91% vs. 72%). Adult children perceive that their fathers understand them better than mothers (76% vs. 18%).
- More participants felt they could rely on their fathers for help than on mothers (57% vs. 12%). They perceive their mother criticizes more (24% vs. 14%) but father demands more (19% vs. 13%).
- More adult children reported having disagreements with their mothers than with their fathers in dealing with practical matters (40% vs. 15%).

=== Caregiving ===
- More than half of adult children in the study have to help their father (56%) and mother (61%) with instrumental activities of daily life.
- Most participants perceive their father and mother expect them to be the primary caregivers (66% and 71%) and that they are the actual primary caregivers (66% and 71%).
- Caregiver burden is common (73%). Time-dependence burden (67%) is the most frequently reported burden.
- Approximately 87% of adult children agree that the community should share a great amount of responsibilities in taking care of older adults.

=== Family conflict ===
- Over half (60%) of the adult children screen positive for potential caregiver mistreatment. Having trouble with their parents' temper or aggression is common (25%).
- One third of the participants had been physically mistreated by their parents before turning 18 years old (28%), and 15% of them thought that was serious.

=== Psychological well-being ===
- In the last month, one third of participants (32%) felt that they are nervous and stressed, and 32% felt that they cannot cope with things they have to do.
- 21% of participants experience a sense of loneliness. Over half (54%) of participants present symptoms of anxiety.
- A total of 44% of participants displayed at least one depressive symptom in the past two weeks.

=== Social well-being ===
- The participants are more likely to engage in monthly home-bound activities, including watching TV (97%) and reading (84%).
- One in ten participants have no relative who they can count on for help (10%).
- Nearly one in five (18%) participants have no friends with whom they can talk about private matters.

== Implications ==
The data collected from the PIETY Study show that Chinese American adult children confront significant life and health challenges in providing care for their aging parents due to multiple social, structural, cultural and linguistic barriers. Nevertheless, these health challenges also represent tremendous opportunities for family members, community stakeholders, researchers, health professionals, social service agencies, and policy makers to work in concert to improve the health and well-being of all Chinese Americans.

== Future directions ==
Longitudinal studies are needed to better understand changes of biological, behavioral, familial, social, and cultural factors over time. Currently, the PIETY Study is undergoing the second wave of data collection. The third wave is starting in 2017 to examine how the health and intergenerational relationships of Chinese adults change, in order to better understand the causes of certain health outcomes.
