= Miriam Lee =

China-born American acupuncturist (1926–2009)

Miriam Lee (1926 – June 24, 2009) was one of the pioneering acupuncturists in the United States and was responsible for acupuncture being legalized in California.

Miriam Lee was born in China in 1926, but left the mainland in 1949. In China, she was a nurse-midwife before becoming an acupuncturist. Lee lived through the Second Sino-Japanese War. After leaving China, she lived in Singapore for 17 years before coming to the United States. When she arrived in California, acupuncture was illegal. So Lee worked on a factory assembly line and gave treatments quietly out of her home. Later, she shared a space with a supportive medical doctor. In 1974, Lee was arrested for practicing medicine without a license. At her trial, her patients protested her arrest, claiming their right to the only medicine that had helped them. Within a few days, acupuncture was legally made an experimental procedure by Governor Ronald Reagan. In 1976, Governor Jerry Brown signed the legislation that legalized acupuncture in California. Lee was one of California's first licensed acupuncturists holding California Acupuncture License Number 6 issued October 19, 1976. She received her O.M.D. from the San Francisco College of Acupuncture and Oriental Medicine on June 10, 1984.

In the 1970s and early 1980s, Lee was the acupuncture teacher of probably 70% of practitioners working in Northern California. She used a special set of points based on the work of one of her teachers, Tung Ching Chang, known as the "Master Tung Magic Points." These are published in a book by Blue Poppy Press. During the height of her practice, she would see up to 10 patients an hour and worked 80 hours a week.

She popularized a 10-point protocol in her book, Insights of A Senior Acupuncturist. Lee describes a combination of points that have wide application: ST36, SP6, LI4, LI11, and LU7. She also popularized the Master Tung Ching Chang's Magic Points, a nontraditional point system.

The Acupuncture Association of America was founded in 1980 and run by Lee until 1998, when she retired and passed the care of AAA over to her student, Susan Johnson. The purpose of the organization is to promote public acupuncture education, provide continuing education for licensed practitioners, to engage in legislative advocacy, and to promote acupuncture research.

Lee died on June 24, 2009, a few weeks after suffering a stroke.
