= Louis Hsieh =

Chinese businessman and lawyer

Louis T. Hsieh
- Born: Louis Tung Jung Hsieh; 1965 (age 59–60)
- Citizenship: United States
- Education: Stanford University; Harvard Business School; University of California, Berkeley
- Occupation: Businessman
- Title: Global CFO, Hesai Group

Louis Tung Jung Hsieh (Chinese: 謝東螢, born c. 1965) is a Chinese businessman and lawyer and the global chief financial officer (CFO) and director of Hesai Group (Nasdaq: HSAI), a company supplying three-dimensional light detection and ranging (LiDAR) solutions. Hsieh joined Hesai as CFO in April 2021 and became a director in June 2021. He helped take the company public on Nasdaq in February 2023, with an initial public offering (IPO) that was oversubscribed by approximately 20 times.

Hsieh is a director at New Oriental Education & Technology Group (NYSE: EDU, HKSE: 09901), or New Oriental, a Chinese provider of private educational services, as well as an independent director and chairman of the audit committee of JD.com (NASDAQ: JD, HKSE: 09618), and an independent director of YUM China Holdings, Inc. (NYSE: YUMC, HKSE: 09987), a restaurant operator in China.

== Early life ==
Hsieh received a bachelor's degree in Industrial Engineering and Engineering Management from Stanford University, an MBA from Harvard Business School, and a Juris Doctor (JD) from the University of California, Berkeley, before joining the State Bar of California.

From 1990-95, he worked at White & Case LLP as a corporate securities attorney. He then worked at Credit Suisse in Palo Alto and as a vice president at J.P. Morgan & Co. for four years. He subsequently served as a managing director of UBS Capital Asia Pacific (2000–02), managing director of Darby Asia Investors (2002–03), and CFO of Ario Data Networks (2003-2005).

== New Oriental ==
In 2005, Hsieh became the CFO of New Oriental, China's largest private educational services provider. He helped launch New Oriental's 2006 initial public offering (IPO) on the New York Stock Exchange, which was oversubscribed 35 times.

In 2007, Hsieh was named a board director, and in 2009, he became New Oriental's president. The number of New Oriental schools doubled in following two years, and in 2011, Hsieh announced that the company would slow its expansion for a time and make more of an effort to fill existing classrooms and facilities. During Hsieh's time as president, New Oriental also dramatically expanded its POP Kids program, which provided language instruction to children from 3–14 years of age.

One of the more notable events of Hsieh's tenure was the 2012 publication of a report by an American firm, Muddy Waters Research, that stated that New Oriental was using accounting tricks to overstate its profits, and that it would soon have to restate its earnings. The Muddy Waters report coincided with an investigation by the US Securities and Exchange Commission and caused EDU to drop by 57% on the New York Stock Exchange. Hsieh defended New Oriental in the press, stating that Muddy Waters had incorrectly extrapolated New Oriental's accounting and business model from one of its subsidiaries. New Oriental ultimately did not restate its earnings as Muddy Waters had predicted, and its stock rebounded by over four times since its low of $9.50 on July 18, 2012, the date of the SEC investigation announcement following the Muddy Waters report. The SEC investigation was concluded in 2014 without any enforcement action.

In April 2015, Hsieh was succeeded as CFO by Stephen Zhihui Yang, but continued to serve as New Oriental's president. In January 2016, Hsieh stepped down as New Oriental's president and was succeeded by Chenggang Zhou. Hsieh remains a non-executive director and a senior advisor.

== Other positions ==
Beginning in 2017, Hsieh was the chief financial officer at NIO (NYSE: NIO), a global electric vehicle manufacturer based in China which completed an IPO in September 2018. Hsieh resigned from the company in October 2019. From August 2016 through September 2017, Hsieh was an independent director and chairman of the audit committee of Nord Anglia Education Inc. (formerly NASDAQ: NORD, taken private in 2017). Hsieh served as an independent director and chairman of the audit committee of Perfect World (formerly NASDAQ: PWRD, taken private in 2015) from 2007 through 2009. He has also served as a board member at LDK Solar, where he was chairman of the audit committee.
