= Dong Yuhui =

Chinese internet celebrity

Dong Yuhui (Chinese: 董宇輝; pinyin: Dǒng Yǔhuī; born 1993) is a former English tutor turned live-streamer and internet celebrity, known for his work with New Oriental Education & Technology Group. He gained popularity through his unique approach to live-streaming sales, combining English learning tips and culture awareness content with product pitches on the Douyin platform. He was once a senior partner of East Buy, and the Vice President of the Cultural and Tourism branch of New Oriental. He departed New Oriental in August 2024 and currently leads his own e-commerce business "Time with Yuhui".

== Life and career ==
Dong Yuhui grew up in the rural area of Tongguan, Shanxi province. He graduated from the Tourism College of Xi'an International Studies University in 2015. In early 2015, Dong Yuhui joined New Oriental and became a high school English teacher. In 2016, he was appointed the head of English teaching at New Oriental. He started teaching online courses in 2019 and once served as the head of Grade 12 English and director of training at New Oriental Online. At the age of 23, he became the institution's youngest teaching and research supervisor focusing on high school English. During his teaching career, he had taught more than 500,000 students.

Following a state policy shift in late 2021 which substantially trimmed the private tutoring industry, Dong transitioned to live-streaming sales for New Oriental. This career shift was part of the company's pivot from education services to e-commerce with a focus on agricultural product sales, under the rebranded name Oriental Select (东方甄选).

In his live stream sessions, Dong combined product pitches with educational content, blending English language tips and cultural references to engage his audience. He incorporates diverse subjects into his sales scripts, touching upon history, physics, chemistry, astronomy, and biology. He shares personal and relatable stories, such as tales of social fatigue and the comforts of family life, to build emotional trust with his audience. This approach differentiated him from other live-streaming hosts and attracted increasing following since June 2022. Oriental Select saw a rapid revenue increase due to Dong's presence.

As of December 2023, Dong has nearly 1.5 million followers on Wei Bo, 10 times the 116,000 followers of East Buy's official account (the company that operates the live streaming platform Oriental Select). On Douyin, the Chinese version of TikTok, Dong has around 22 million followers on his personal account, while the company's official Douyin account – its main online presence where a team of about 10 hosts including Dong regularly appear – has around 29 million followers.

== Departure from East Buy ==
In December 2023, a controversy arose when it was revealed that some of Dong Yuhui's live-stream talking points, including a short essay about Jilin, were not originally written by him, sparking backlash from his fans, a boycott of Oriental Selection (East Buy), and a drop in the company's stock price and followers. This clash led to the dismissal of CEO Sun Dongxu despite apologies from founder Yu Minhong. Later that month, Dong's status was resolved with his promotion to senior partner, cultural assistant to Yu Minhong, and vice-president of New Oriental Culture and Tourism Group, resulting in a sharp recovery as East Buy's shares rose over 21%.

In the aftermath, "Time with Yuhui" (与辉同行, Yuhuitongxing) was established as a wholly owned subsidiary of East Buy at the end of 2023, led by Dong Yuhui as director and general manager. The venture focused on cultural and tourism-related content, with livestreaming sessions at notable tourism spots in Hubei, Chongqing, and Shanxi to highlight local cultural heritage and regional products.

On the evening of January 9, 2024, Dong Yuhui's independent account "Time with Yuhui" premiered its first live broadcast. Within 20 minutes of the live session, the account had received over 200 million likes. As of that evening, the account had amassed over 7 million followers.

On July 25, 2024, Dong officially announced his resignation from East Buy, and attributed his departure to career aspirations and personal commitments. As part of his exit, East Buy sold Dong's venture, "Time with Yuhui" to him for 76.6 million yuan, although CEO Michael Yu Minhong stated that he had made arrangement to allow Dong to take over the venture for free. The news led to an 8% drop in New Oriental's shares in pre-trading, prompting East Buy to announce a share buyback plan worth up to 500 million yuan over the next year. After the departure, Dong stated that the company would encounter uncertainties and challenges without the backing of its parent company.

In January 2025, Oriental Selection recorded a net loss of RMB 96.5 million for the first half of its 2025 fiscal year, attributing the downturn in part to Dong Yuhui's July 2024 departure and his acquisition of the "Time with Yuhu" livestream brand.

== Time with Yuhui ==
In 2025, "Time with Yuhui", the primary live-streaming product of Time with Yuhui (Beijing) Technology Ltd., continued to exhibit strong growth momentum, focusing on knowledge-based live-streaming sales and cultural-tourism promotion. From its independent launch on January 9, 2024 to January 8, 2025, "Time with Yuhui" achieved cumulative sales exceeding 102 billion yuan with over 1.6 billion orders, becoming the top estimated sales live room on Douyin. Entering 2025, the average live-stream sales for "Time with Yuhui" stabilized in the 25-50 million yuan range per session, with fewer sessions but significantly improved per-session efficiency. During the Double 11 shopping season, sales exceeded 300 million yuan over three days. For the Mid-Autumn Festival, the custom-crafted mooncake gift boxes co-branded with Daoxiangcun sold out 240,000 units within one hour of launch, setting a new single-product sales peak. The company actively expanded its cultural-tourism business, with the 2025 "Reading Mountains and Rivers" series covering multiple regions, driving sales of local agricultural products and tourism items. It also obtained MCN qualifications (网络文化经营许可) and relevant licenses, further developing performance brokerage and tourism operations.

== Award ==
In April 2025, Dong received the newly created category of honor, the "Outstanding Communication Award" at the 2024 People's Literature Awards (人民文学奖), recognizing his role in popularizing contemporary Chinese literature through livestreams.
