= The PINE Study =

Population Study of Chinese Elderly
- Abbreviation: The PINE Study
- Purpose: To improve the health and quality of life of the U.S. Chinese Aging population through education, research, advocacy, poly and sustainable community-engagement.
- Location: The Chicago area
- Methods: Community-based participatory research
- Official language: English, Mandarin, Cantonese, Taishanese, Teochew
- Main organ: Chinese Health, Aging, and Policy Program, Rush Institute for Healthy Aging, Rutgers University
- Affiliations: Northwestern University, Chinese American Service League, Xilin Asian Community Center
- Budget: NIH funded
- Website: chinesehealthyaging.org/pinestudy.html

The Population Study of Chinese Elderly (PINE) Study is a collaborative effort between the Chinese Health, Aging, and Policy Program at Rutgers University, Northwestern University and several community services organizations, including Chinese American Service League, Midwest Asian Health Association (MAHA) and Xilin Asian Community Center as the main community partners. This synergistic academic-community partnership is led by XinQi Dong at Rutgers University, Melissa A Simon Esther Wong, Bernarda Wong and utilizes a community-based participatory research approach.

The PINE Study is an extensive study that examines the general health and quality of life of Chinese elderly in the Chicago metropolitan area–the largest cohort of Chinese elderly ever assembled for epidemiological research in Western countries. The image and acronym "PINE" was used as a suitable name for the study as in Chinese culture, it symbolizes "longevity, resilience, respect and successful aging", which is parallel to the research objectives.

Between 2011 and 2013, 3,159 face-to-face interviews were conducted with elderly living in the community, ages ranging from 60 to 105. Each participant’s interview was personalized according to the languages or dialects they preferred, such as English, Cantonese, Taishanese, Mandarin or Teochew. Data were assembled using a web-based program application which had English, Chinese traditional and simplified characters.

== Background ==
=== Overall Chinese population ===
The Chinese constitutes 56 different ethnicity, with 53 language dialects, 21 of which possessed their own written scripts.

=== Chinese population in United States ===
Asian American population, including those who are of mixed race, is estimated to be 18.2 million in 2010; those who identify only as Asian is estimated to total 14.7 million, approximately 4.8 percent of the population. Census BureauExternal Web Site Icon anticipates that there will be more than 40.6 million Asians present in the United States, comprising 9.2 percent of the total U.S. population by the year of 2050. Amongst the Asian population, Chinese population (except Taiwanese descent) is one of the largest Asian groups in the United States in 2011, constituting 4 million people. The distribution of Chinese American population was found to be mostly in California (1,122,187, 40 percent), New York (451,859 16 percent), Hawaii (170,803), Texas (121,588), New Jersey (110, 263) and Massachusetts (92,380) with Illinois (86,095). Chicago is among the top 10 cities where Chinese Americans are concentrated. In most major US Cities, Chinese communities are mostly dominant in Chinatowns, usually called as "Tang2 Ren2 Jie1" in Mandarin and "Tong yan gai" in Cantonese. One of the largest Chinatowns in North American is Chinatown, Chicago, where first few Chinese immigrants settled when they arrived in Chicago in the 1870s.

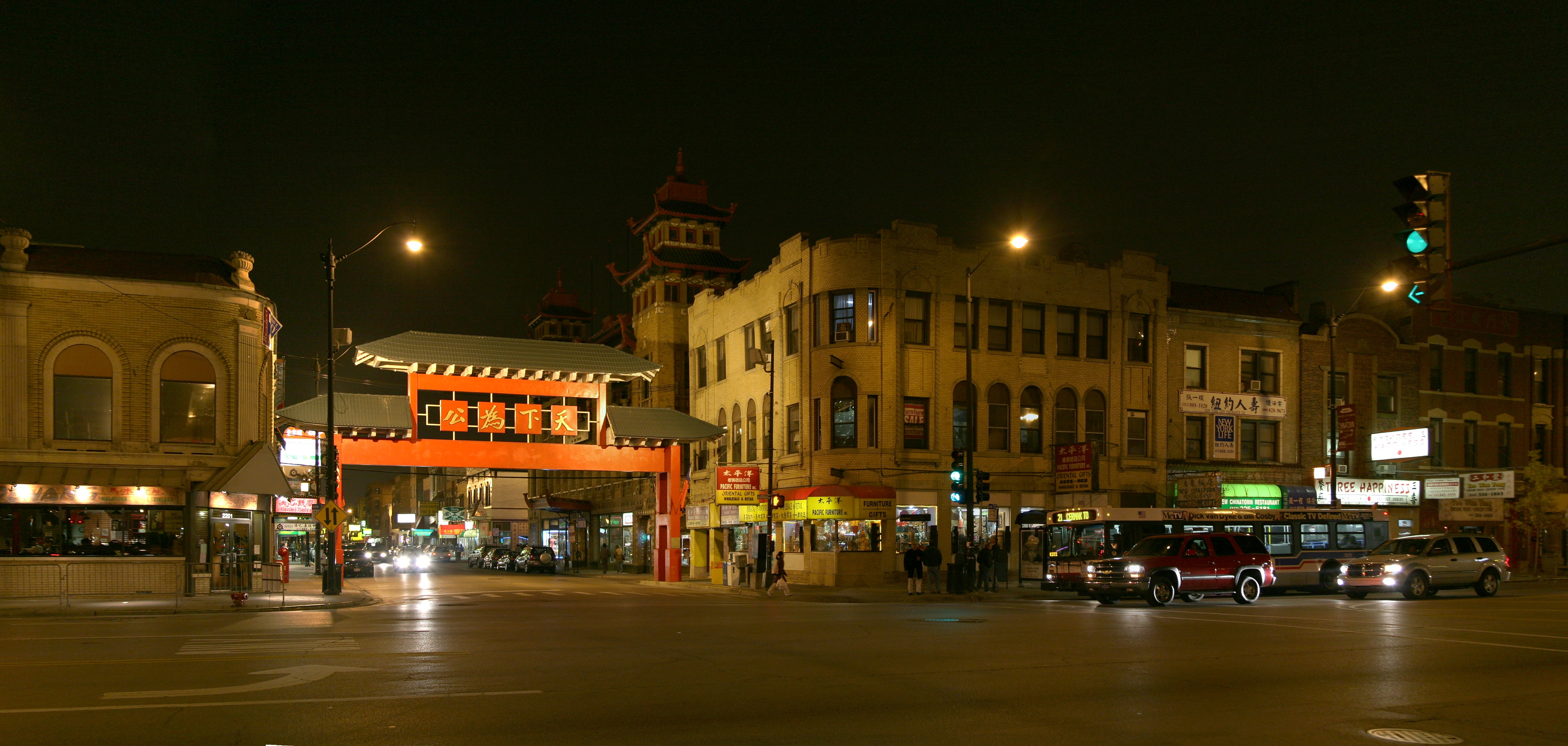
Chicago Chinatown Gate at Night

Among 56 ethnic groups in China, Mandarin is mostly used. In Chicago, Mandarin, in addition to Cantonese, Taishanese and Teochew dialects are very commonly used.

=== Chinese population in Chicago ===
In 1910, Chinese population in Chicago increased to 1,000. 2 years later, increasing living costs and racial discrimination led most Chinese towards the south side of Chicago, leading to the establishment of the current Chinatown near Wentworth and Cermak. After the 1943 Chinese Exclusion Act repeal, a second wave of immigration occurred due to economic opportunities and family reunion. The revolution that occurred in mainland China in 1952 and the Tiannanmen Square protests in 1989 further increased the settlement of Chinese in the US. The Chinese population from Hong Kong, Taiwan and China further increased with the 1965 Immigration and Nationality Act in addition to the increase the visa quota by 40% in 1990. In the 1970s, Chicago has the 4th largest Chinese population in the US and by 2012, Census 2010 data recorded 42,060 Chinese in Chicago. After the conclusion of Vietnam war in 1975, a large number of ethnic Chinese from Vietnam, Cambodia, Thailand and Laos settled at uptown Argyle. In Illinois, Chinese community is growing rapidly and increased 35.4% between year 2000 to 2010. This rate is much faster than the African Americans (decreased 1%), Hispanic (increased 33%) and White (decreased 3%) population. Similar trends are seen in Cook County. For the past 10 years, the Chinese population has experienced an increase of 30% in Cook County in contrast to the declining total population. Chicago also experienced a similar pattern; Chinese population increased by 35.7% whereas the overall population decreased by 7%.

=== Project goal ===
With rapidly increasing global aging population, it is estimated that China's elderly population aged over 60 will hit 360 million by 2030. Concurrently, it is conceived that between 2012 and 2050, United States will also experience considerable growth in its older population, from 43.1million to 83.7 million, due to the baby boomers. Amongst the Asian subpopulation, the Chinese American was found to be one of the oldest, largest and the most rapid expanding society. Furthermore, they are also growing rapidly with a growth rate of almost four times higher than of overall U.S. older adult population from 2000 to 2010.

Despite national statistics reports where U.S. Chinese older adults possess a longer life expectancy as compared to the general population, the initial phase of PINE Study discovered that elderly may not be enjoying the best quality of life. By shedding light on the health and well-being of Chicago Chinese older adults, the goal is to improve the health and quality of life of the Chinese aging population through education, research, advocacy, policy and sustainable community engagement in the Chicago area, and beyond.

== Methods ==
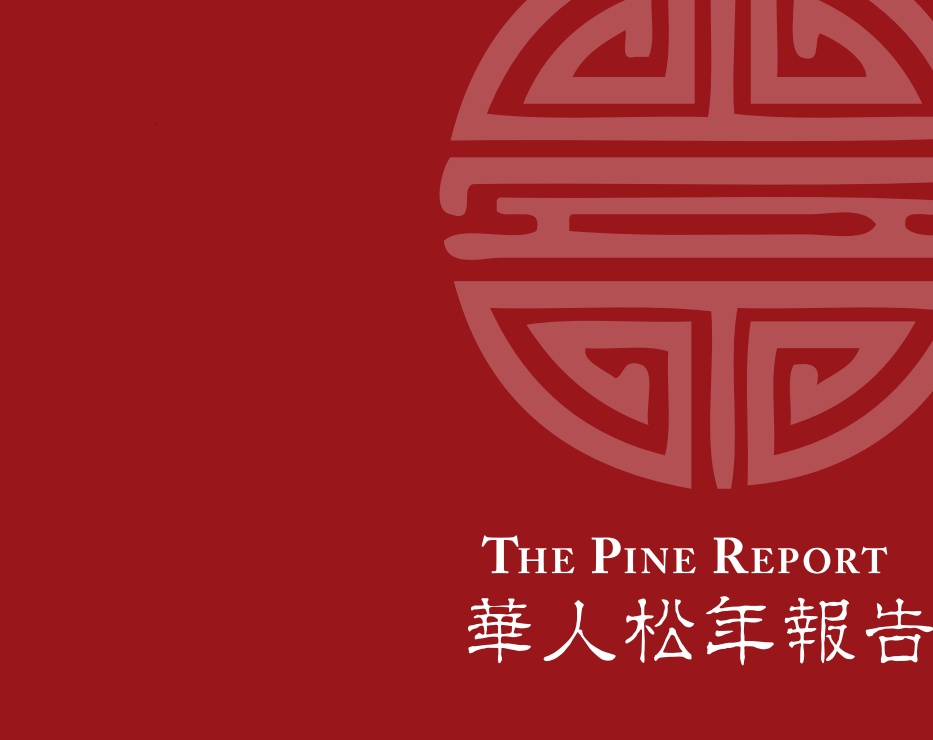
The PINE Report

=== Community-based participatory research ===
PINE Study team executed a community-based participatory research approach in order to assess Chicago Chinese population's health needs, congruent to social, cultural and linguistic background. CBPR was the foundation to promote Chinese community health. This research design uses exhaustive health inquiry for education, empowerment and affecting sustainable social change, and engagement the participation of community members affected by health issues. For the last decade, this partnership between academic and community centers has been catered to improve the Chicago’s Chinese population's quality of life.

=== Data collection ===
Chinese elderly older than 60 in the Chicago metropolitan area were invited to participate in the study. Participants have been contacted in community settings, such as community-based organizations, social services agencies, churches, educational and outreach activities, senior apartments, newsletters and advertisements in community centers, and also by word of mouth. Multicultural and multilingual interviewers were trained to conduct in-home interviews face-to-face with participants in the language or dialect they are more comfortable with, which are predominantly Cantonese, Taishanese, English, Mandarin and Teochew dialects. During the 2011-2013 period, over 3,000 interviews were conducted. Questions were selected from scales that were validated in social science and public health research, translated into Chinese (if Chinese version was not available) and translated it back to English. The survey questionnaires were further inspected by investigator to ensure content and validity. Data were then collected using state-of-science web-based programthat recorded in English, Chinese traditional and simplified characters. This technological platform minimized any information that may be "lost in translation", increasing of the data collected.

== Partners ==
=== Academic partners ===
Rush Institute for Healthy Aging (RIHA) RIHA was formed in 1990 with the goal to better understand community health through rigorous research. Through the years, RIHA has participated in 50 research projects, with over 300 studies, providing knowledge and information about the community in regards to health disparities, cognitive and physical function, quality of life, psychosocial and other issues.

=== Community organizations ===
- Chinese American Service League (CASL)
- Xilin Asian Community Center
- Midwest Asian Health Association (MAHA)

=== Community Advisory Board ===
==== Role ====
The Chinese Community Advisory Board was created to better understanding of needs, and represent the diverse population of Chinese population in Chicago. The Board has played a role in providing overall guidance and advice to the PINE Study, ranging from project conceptualization and preparation, survey implementation, recruitment and finding dissemination. The members are composed of community leaders and representatives from a variety of organizations and disciplines who have frequent interactions with the elderly population and adept in their own fields. Board meetings are held every 1–2 months with continuous feedback to ensure community steady support and to refine project goals and procedures.

=== Funding ===
The PINE Study is funded by the National Institutes of Health and is consistent with NIH's goal of improving health and aging and reducing health disparities in all racial/ethnic groups.

== Data and findings ==
=== Demographic profile ===
- The average age of participants was 73 years old with 59% of women. 58% of the elderly are married while 22% of them live alone.
- Despite elderly in this sample population lived in the US on average for 21 years, 76% of them still exclusively read or speak Chinese, 91% of them socialize with only Chinese people, and 89% have only Chinese friends.
- Elderly in this study have lower education and are more likely to be living with significant financial hardships as compared to national estimates of all US elderly. 86% of them live below the poverty line.
- 36% of the participants consider religion to be important part of their lives with 54% of them performed religious services at home in the last year when we interviewed them.

=== Health ===
- The three most common diseases found amongst Chinese population were hypertension (56%), hypercholesterolemia (49%) and osteoarthritis (39%). These levels were similar and slightly higher than US National estimates. *The leading causes of mortality were heart disease (25%), cancer (23%) and stroke.
- 8% of study participants reported limitation of at least one aspect of Activities of Daily Living (ADL), predominantly walking and bathing.
- 51% of participants reported at least one limitation of Instrumental Activities of Daily Living (IADL), predominantly shopping, doing housework and laundry.

=== Healthcare utilization ===
- Chinese elderly uninsured rate is 5 times higher than national estimate. At time of interview, 24% of elderly do not have insurance.
- Chinese elderly are found to not receive lesser preventive healthcare as compared to the national estimate, with 28% receiving a colonoscopy and 35% receiving a mammogram in the last two years.
- Traditional Chinese Medicine is used commonly by 76% of participants who reported the use of traditional health remedies in the past year.

=== Mental health ===
- Mental health is a significant health burden in Chinese elderly population with an alarmingly high amount of elderly experiencing various form of psychological distress. 74% of elderly report life stress, 66% experience anxiety symptoms and 55% of elderly reports depressive symptoms.
- Suicidal ideation and attempts are disproportionately prevalent with 3.7% of Chinese elderly over the age of 60 report suicidal thoughts in a year as compared to 2.3% of US older adults aged 50 and over. 9.4% of them had suicidal thoughts at some point during their lifetime, with 2 out of 1000 participants attempted suicide in the past year. Lifetime suicide attempts were prevalent at 9 out of 1000.

=== Elder abuse ===
- Elder abuse is an alarming health issue that was faced by Chinese elderly, with 24% experienced some form of abuse, predominantly psychological abuse (10%) and financial exploitation (10%).
- 32% of elderly have also experience other forms of violence before they turned 60, including child abuse and domestic partner violence.

=== Social well-being ===
- The Chinese elder's social networks tend to center around family than friends, with 71% of elderly participants who identifies more than 4 close family members. On the other hand, 14% of participants report not having any friends.
- It was found that elderly perceive social support more from family members (90%) than friends (70%) and depend on family's support (90%) than friends (60%).
- Chinese elderly continue to expect the value filial piety, which is a culturally critical factor that expects children's caregiving obligations. This expectation is mainly placed upon the emotional aspect of care such as respect (90%) which is twice the expectation of instrumental care like financial support (43%).
- Chinese elderly exhibit a high sense of belonging in the community where they reside and the feeling that the neighborhood is a good place to live in and feel right at home in the community they are in.

== Publications ==
The data from the PINE study was used to publish more than hundreds of research papers by professionals, from various academic fields, across the states and countries. In 2014, special issues for the PINE study were published by the Journal of Gerontology Series A and AIMS Medical Science, and in 2017, by the Journal of Gerontology Series A.

== Implications ==
Data collected from the PINE Study shows that there are many concerns with health disparity issues that are found in this rapidly expanding aging US community. At present, there are very few services that cater to the need of Chinese older adults and their families, with a lack workforce able to provide appropriate care, taking into consideration their linguistic and cultural needs. This demonstrates the need for increased social and health care services in the interest of this vulnerable population. A multi-disciplinary partnership is sought to provide them with a much needed disease prevention, intervention and support strategies for successful aging.

== Future directions ==
=== Longitudinally ===
Currently, the study has completed the third wave of data collection, and is in PINE phase 4.0, where the study team follows up on the Chinese elderly to examine the health status changes over time in order to better understand the risk and protective factors associated with health disparities.

=== Additional studies ===
==== Patient navigation program ====
This project targets low-income women and to guide navigation around the U.S. healthcare and preventive care systems, in attempt to eliminate access barriers in addition to provide early intervention and prevention measures to promote healthy and successful aging.

==== Promoting Social and Emotional Well-Being in the Chinese Community ====
This program aimed to lower rates of mental distress and promote mental well-being of U.S. Chinese adults through empowering education, referral to treatment, care coordination, and behavioral activation by Community Health Workers (CHWs). Each participant received personalized intervention, which help him/ her cope with emotions.

==== Focus group discussions ====
Focus groups discussions examine key issues, such as mental health, cancer and intergenerational relationships that Chinese elderly face, via in-depth in person or interactive group interviews, where participants talk freely about the discussed topics.

=== Data sharing ===
As described in the National Institutes of Health (NIH) Data Sharing Policy, data sharing encourages the use of exclusive data, advocates quality collaborations that across institutions, and expedite rapid translation of research data into publicly accessible knowledge Collaborative research effort through data sharing is critical to the success of the ongoing effort promote health and well-being among Chinese elderly.
