= Dong Chen =

Chinese immunologist (born 1967)

- 董晨
- Born: July 1967 (age 59); Wuhan, Hubei, China
- Education: Wuhan University; University of Alabama at Birmingham; Yale University
- Scientific career
- Fields: Immunology
- Workplaces: School of Medicine, Tsinghua University

Dong Chen (Chinese: 董晨; pinyin: Dǒng Chén; born July 1967) is a Chinese immunologist and the current dean of School of Medicine, Tsinghua University.

He is a member of the Chinese Peasants' and Workers' Democratic Party.

== Education ==
Dong was born in Wuhan, Hubei province in 1967. He studied at Wuhan No. 12 High School. In 1985, he entered Wuhan University, where he graduated in 1989. In 1990, he pursued advanced studies in the United States, first earning his doctor's degree in cell and molecular biology from the University of Alabama at Birmingham in 1996 and then did post-doctoral research at Yale School of Medicine from 1997 to 2000.

== Career in the United States ==
In 2000, he became an assistant professor at the University of Washington, serving until 2004. He joined the University of Texas MD Anderson Cancer Center in 2004, becoming tenured professor and dean and director of Inflammation and Tumor Center in 2008.

== Career in China ==
He returned to China in 2013 and that same year became professor at Tsinghua University. In 2013, he became the vice-dean of its School of Medicine, rising to dean three years later. He is also director of the Institute of Immunology, Tsinghua University.

== Honours and awards ==
- November 22, 2019 Member of the Chinese Academy of Sciences (CAS)
