= Tung Ching Chang =

Chinese acupuncturist

Tung Ching Ch'ang (1916–1975) (董景昌; Dǒng Jǐng Chāng in Pinyin Romanization), commonly known as Master Tung, was an acupuncturist and the first to teach the Tung acupuncture system outside of the Tung family.

== Biography ==
Tung was born in 1916 into an acupuncture family in Ping Du County, Shandong Province, China, and began his career as an acupuncturist at the early age of 18. He served in the Kuo Min Tang (KMT) (Chinese Nationalist Party) army during WWII, and used his skills to help his fellow soldiers. In 1949, the Maoists reigned victorious and Nationalists (KMT) retreated to the island of Taiwan, and Tung also left permanently for Taiwan. In 1960s, he opened a private acupuncture clinic to practice there.

Tung's acupuncture techniques were passed down over generations only within the Tung family. Tung Ching Chang was the last descendant of the Tung family to practice this unique style, and he decided to accept his first disciple, Lin Ju Chu, outside the Tung family in 1962 in Taipei, Taiwan, bringing the unique style to generations of practitioners to come. Dr Lin Ju Chu moved to the US, where he had only one disciple: Calvin Chien (L.Ac and OMD in California), who now has a clinic in the USA.

In 1970s, Taiwan began the process of formal licensing for doctors of Chinese medicine, and Tung was denied a license and forced out of practice due to not having formal schooling. He soon after died in 1975.

== Tung's points ==
Tung's acupuncture is a system of acupuncture based on a five zang six fu channel system rather than the traditional 14 channels of acupuncture. The points are classified according to the five elements and five zang channel system. In addition, Tung uses a corresponding palmar diagnosis method also based on the five elements and five zang channel system. Tung's acupuncture incorporates methods of holographic imaging, needling in the extremities, blood letting, and inserting three needles in succession in a therapeutic region. Tung's acupuncture is characterized by its simplicity, ease of use, and great clinical efficacy.

== Legacy ==
Over the course of his life, Tung trained 73 students who went on to continue teaching his style of acupuncture. In 1973, Tung authored his publication Tung’s Acupuncture, Its Regular Channels & Unique Points.

Dr. Miriam Lee and Dr. Wei-Chieh Young, two of his students, introduced Tung's Points to the U.S.
