= Dong Shaoming =

Chinese engineer

- Born: October 1962 (age 63); Laizhou, Shandong, China
- Education: South China University of Technology
- Scientific career
- Fields: Ceramic matrix composite Reinforced carbon–carbon Physical chemistry of materials
- Workplaces: Shanghai Institute of Ceramics, Chinese Academy of Sciences

Chinese name
- Traditional Chinese: 董紹明
- Simplified Chinese: 董绍明
Transcriptions
Standard Mandarin
- Hanyu Pinyin: Dǒng Shàomíng

Dong Shaoming (Chinese: 董绍明; born October 1962) is a Chinese engineer who is a researcher at the Shanghai Institute of Ceramics, Chinese Academy of Sciences.

== Biography ==
Dong was born in October 1962 in Laizhou, Shandong. He received his bachelor's degree and master's degree from South China Institute of Technology (now South China University of Technology) in 1984 and 1987 both in inorganic nonmetallic materials. He obtained his doctor's degree from the Shanghai Institute of Ceramics, Chinese Academy of Sciences in 1996. After graduation, he joined the faculty of Shandong Building Materials College (now Jinan University). He was a senior visiting scholar/visiting researcher at the University of Bordeaux (1998–1999), Kyoto University (1999–2002), and Korea Institute of Machinery and Materials (April 2002–July 2002). He returned to China in 2002 and that same year joined the Shanghai Institute of Ceramics, Chinese Academy of Sciences.

== Honours and awards ==
- 2012 ASM-IIM Lecturer
- 2013 State Technological Invention Award (Second Class)
- 2013 Fellow of the World Academy of Ceramics
- 2013 Global Star Award
- November 22, 2019 Member of the Chinese Academy of Engineering (CAE)
