= Dong Hairong =

Chinese transportation engineer

Dong Hairong (Heidy Dong, Chinese: 董海荣) is a Chinese transportation engineer focusing on automated train scheduling and operation, and intelligent transportation systems. She is a professor in the State Key Laboratory of Rail Traffic Control and Safety of Beijing Jiaotong University, deputy director of the National Engineering Research Center for Rail Transportation Operation Control System, and chair of the IEEE Technical Committee on Railroad Systems and Applications.

Dong has a Ph.D. from Peking University, completed in 2002. She is a fellow of the Chinese Automation Society, elected in 2020, and was named to the 2025 class of IEEE Fellows, "for contributions to the intelligent and autonomous operation and control of railway transportation systems".
