= Dong Jiahong =

Doctor Dong Jiahong FACS FASA (Hon) FEAS (Hon)
- 董家鸿
- Born: March 8, 1960 (age 65)
- Education: BSc, Xuzhou Medical College, (1982); PhD, Army Medical University, (1993)
- Occupation: Surgeon
- Employer: Tsinghua Changgung Hospital
- Honours: Honorary Fellow, American Surgical Association (2015) Honorary Fellow, French Academy of Surgery (2015) Academician, Chinese Academy of Engineering (2017)

Doctor Dong Jiahong (Chinese: 董家鸿; pinyin: Dong Jiāhóng; born March 8, 1960) is a Chinese surgeon specialising in liver transplantation. Dong is the president of Beijing Tsinghua Changgung Hospital, president of the Clinical Medicine School in Tsinghua University, and president of the Society for Hepatopancreatobiliary Surgery in the Chinese Research Hospital Association. He also serves as a committee member of the Chinese Surgical Association and the Chinese Transplantation Association, an executive councillor of the International Society of Digestive Surgery (ISDS), a scientific committee member of the International HPB Association (IHPBA), and honorary foreign member of the French National Academy of Surgery, the American Surgical Association, and the European Surgical Association.

== Education ==
Dong received a BSc from Xuzhou Medical College in 1982, and graduated with a PhD from the Army Medical University in 1993.

== Career ==
In 1996, Dong taught as a tenured professor at the Hepatobiliary Surgery Center at the Army Medical University. In 1998, he was promoted to surgeon-in-chief of the Hepatobiliary Surgery Center at the Third Military Medical University, and in 2006, became head of the Chinese People's Liberation Army General Hospital in Beijing, China.

In 2014, Dong became executive president of Beijing Tsinghua Changgung. Two years later in 2016, Dong and a team of doctors launched the first internet-based alliance of hepatobiliary disease clinics in China to help rural patients gain access to healthcare.

In 2019, Dong led a research team at Tsinghua University which developed a COVID-19 Intelligent Monitoring and Control System, integrating big data, the Internet of Things, and artificial intelligence with clinical medicine. He also remotely led a medical team in Shenzhen from Beijing, completing the world's first remote and cooperative brain surgery using 5G technology.

Dong serves as the editor-in-chief of the Chinese Journal of Digestive Surgery, and according to publication aggregator ResearchGate, has published alongside co-authors 124 papers.

== Honours and awards ==
In 2015, Dong was elected an honorary fellow of the American Surgical Association, and an honorary fellow of the French Academy of Surgery for his works in technical surgery, and surgical education. In 2017, he was elected an Academician of the Division of Medicine and Hygiene.
