= Peking University Health Science Center =

Medical school in Beijing, China

Peking University Health Science Center is the academic medical center of Peking University, which has 14 affiliated hospitals in Beijing, China. It became the independent Beijing Medical College in 1952. Later in 1985, it was renamed Beijing Medical University. It merged back with Peking University in 2000 and in 2005, it was named Peking University Health Science Center.

== History ==
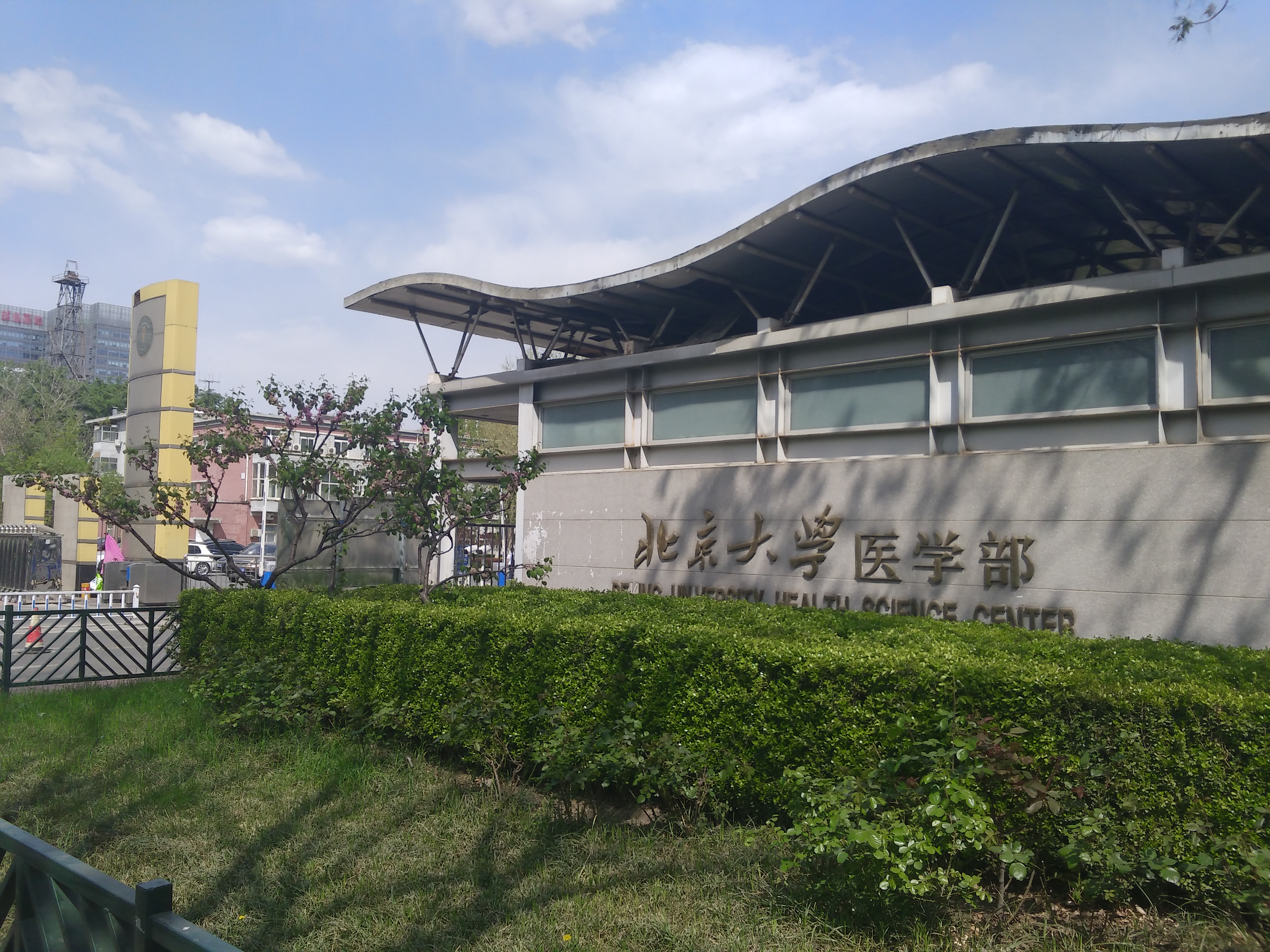
West Gate of Peking University Health Science Center

It was first established in 1902 as the Medical branch of Imperial College of Peking (later on became Peking University). It was discontinued due to government funding in 1908 and reopened on October 26, 1912, after the Qing dynasty conceded to the Republic of China in the same area in the city of Beijing. It was the first of its kind in China to teach western medicine and train medical doctors following the British medical education system. The professional degree offered to the Clinical medicine graduates is equivalent to the Scottish system 'MD'.

It became the independent Beijing Medical College in 1952. Later in 1985, it was renamed Beijing Medical University.

In 1954, Beijing Medical University was listed by the State Council as one of the Top-Six National Key Universities. It merged back with Peking University in 2000 and is now named Peking University Health Science Center.

== Academics ==
PUHSC offers a full range of courses for eight specialties including basic medical sciences, clinical medicine, preventive medicine, stomatology, pharmacy, nursing, medical laboratory diagnosis and biomedical English. It has 57 accredited doctoral programs. PUHSC hosts six postdoctoral programs. PUHSC has an enrollment of 927 doctoral students and 388 international students.

PUHSC has developed 20 disciplines that have gained national recognition. Besides, it has one national key laboratory, 10 ministry-level key laboratories, 23 joint research centers, and 20 research institutes at university level. PUHSC has 11 schools, one institute and one division: School of Basic Medical Sciences, School of Pharmaceutical Sciences, School of Public Health, School of Nursing, School of Stomatology, the First School of Clinical Medicine (Beida Hospital), the Second School of Clinical Medicine (the People's Hospital), the Third School of Clinical Medicine (the Third Hospital), Institute of Mental Health (the Sixth Hospital), the School of Oncology (Beijing Tumor Hospital), Peking University Shenzhen School of Medicine, Peking University School of Telemedical Education, and the Division of Humanity and Fundamental Sciences. In addition, 15 hospitals in Beijing serve as teaching hospitals.

== Rankings and reputation ==
Clinical medicine of the Peking University Health Science Center is consistently ranked among the top three medical schools in China and #24 globally by Times Higher Education World University Rankings as of 2022.

For the high quality of research in life science, it ranked first in the Asia & Oceania region and 23rd globally among the leading universities in the Nature Index 2022 Annual Tables.

Its "Dentistry & Oral Sciences", "Public Health" and "Nursing" were ranked #43, #51 and #76 in the world respectively by the Academic Ranking of World Universities. Its "Clinical Medicine" also ranked #69 globally by the U.S. News & World Report globally.

== Alumni ==
- Zhong Nanshan - Discovered the SARS coronavirus
- Tu Youyou—One of three co-winners of the 2015 Nobel Prize in Physiology or Medicine, and winner of the 2011 Albert Lasker Award in Clinical Medicine, both awarded for discovering the important anti-malarial drug artemisinin (also known as Qinghaosu).
- Qiao Jie
- Shu Chien- National Medal of Science, USA (2011)

== See also ==
- Peking University First Hospital
- Peking University Third Hospital
- Healthcare system reform in the People's Republic of China
