= XinQi Dong =

American physician

- 董新奇
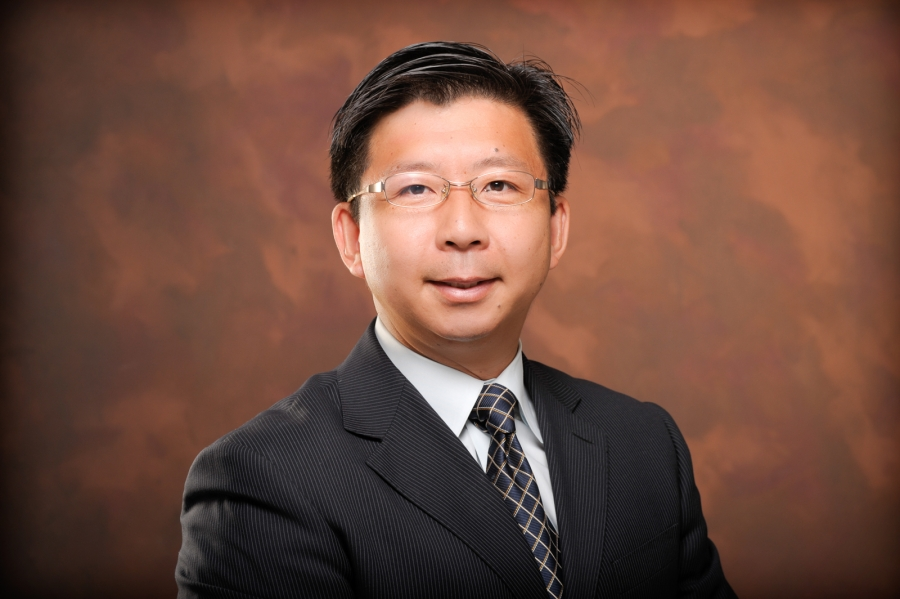
- Born: NanJing, China
- Occupations: President and CEO, Institute for Population Health Sciences
- Known for: The PINE Study, The PIETY Study

Academic background
- Education: Medical Doctor, Master of Public Health
- Alma mater: University of Chicago; Yale University; Rush University; University of Illinois at Chicago

Academic work
- Discipline: Internal Medicine, Geriatrics, Public Health
- Website: https://iphs.org/

XinQi Dong (Chinese: 董新奇) is a doctor of medicine in geriatric medicine and internal medicine, and President and CEO of the Institute for Population Health Sciences. Founded in 2022, the Institute for Population Health Sciences (IPHS) seeks to advance population health sciences through scientific research, adaptive training and coaching, and partnership development to improve health and wellbeing of diverse populations.

As an expert on population health and aging issues, Dong has appeared in multiple media outlets, including The New York Times, The Wall Street Journal, The Washington Post, Politico, The Huffington Post, Reuters, Science Daily, International Business Times, CBS Chicago, Fox News, NBC News, New America Media, DNA info, and many others.

Dr. Dong has led multiple population-based epidemiological studies, including the New Jersey Population Health Cohort Study, The PINE Study and the Asian Resource Centers for Minority Aging Research to quantify the causal relationships among trauma, resilience and health outcomes.

Dong also has led several epidemiological studies, investigating more than 4,000 Chinese adults, in order to better understand the health and well-being of Chinese families in the United States.

== Recent studies ==
=== New Jersey Population Health Cohort Study ===
The New Jersey Population Health Cohort Study, currently in a one-year design phase, aims to improve the understanding of drivers of population health and health equity in the state. The study will collect granular data over time on approximately 10,000 New Jersey residents representing a broad section of the population, with additional focus on diverse immigrant groups. The first round of data collection is expected to begin in late 2020.

=== The PINE Study ===
The PINE Study (Population Study of ChINese Elderly in Chicago) is a longitudinal study of Chinese older adults who are more than 60 of age living in the Chicago area. The goal is to find out the factors that impact the health and well-being of this population.

=== The PIETY Study ===
The PIETY Study is cross-sectional study investigating Chinese adult children (aged 21 or above) of the participants from the PINE study. The objectives of the PIETY Study is to better understand the factors that influence the health of Chinese elderly from the perspectives of the adult children.

=== Cognitive Impairment Caregiving Study ===
Cognitive Impairment Caregiving Study aims to explore the unique cultural determinants of caregiving experience of adult children whose parent/parent-in-law has memory loss issues, and identify the barriers and challenges those adult children are facing.

=== Promoting Social and Emotional Well-Being in the Chinese Community ===
Promoting Social and Emotional Well-Being in the Chinese Community program aims to lower rates of mental distress and promote mental well-being of U.S. Chinese adults through the assistance of community health workers (CHWs). By using empowering education, referral to treatment, care coordination, and behavioral activation, CHWs help the participant understand and cope with their emotions, and make concrete steps toward improving their mental health and overall well-being.

== Awards ==
2018
Elected Member, American Society of Clinical Investigation
Robert Wood Johnson Foundation Award for Health Equity
2017
M. Powell Lawton Award, Gerontological Society of America
Eward Busse Award, International Congress of Gerontology and Geriatrics
2015
Rosalie S. Wolf Memorial Award, National Adult Protective Services Association

Joseph T. Freeman Award, Gerontological Society of America

APA Award for Advancing Minority Mental Health, American Psychiatric Foundation

2014
APHA National Award for Excellence, American Public Health Association

Outstanding Scientific Achievement for Clinical Investigation Award, American Geriatrics Society

2013
National Rosalie Wolf Award, National Committee for Prevention of Elder Abuse
Before 2012
2011 Maxwell A. Pollack Award for Productive Aging, Gerontological Society of America

2010 Physician Advocacy Merit Award, Institute of Medicine as Profession

2009 Central Society for Clinical Research Award

2008 Paul B. Beeson Physician Faculty Award in Aging

2006 Nobuo Maeda International Aging and Public Health Research Award, American Public Health Association

== Grants ==
- New Jersey Minority Aging Collaborative: R24AG063729
- Asian Resource Centers for Minority Aging Research (RCMAR): P30AG059304
- National Institute on Nursing Research: R01NR 014846_A1
- National Institute of Aging/NINR/NIMH: R01AG042318
- National Institute of Minority Health and Health Disparity: R01MD006173
- National Cancer Institute: R01CA163830, P20CA165592d Opinion Research Center (NORC)
