= New Oriental =

Private education company in China

New Oriental Education & Technology Group Inc.

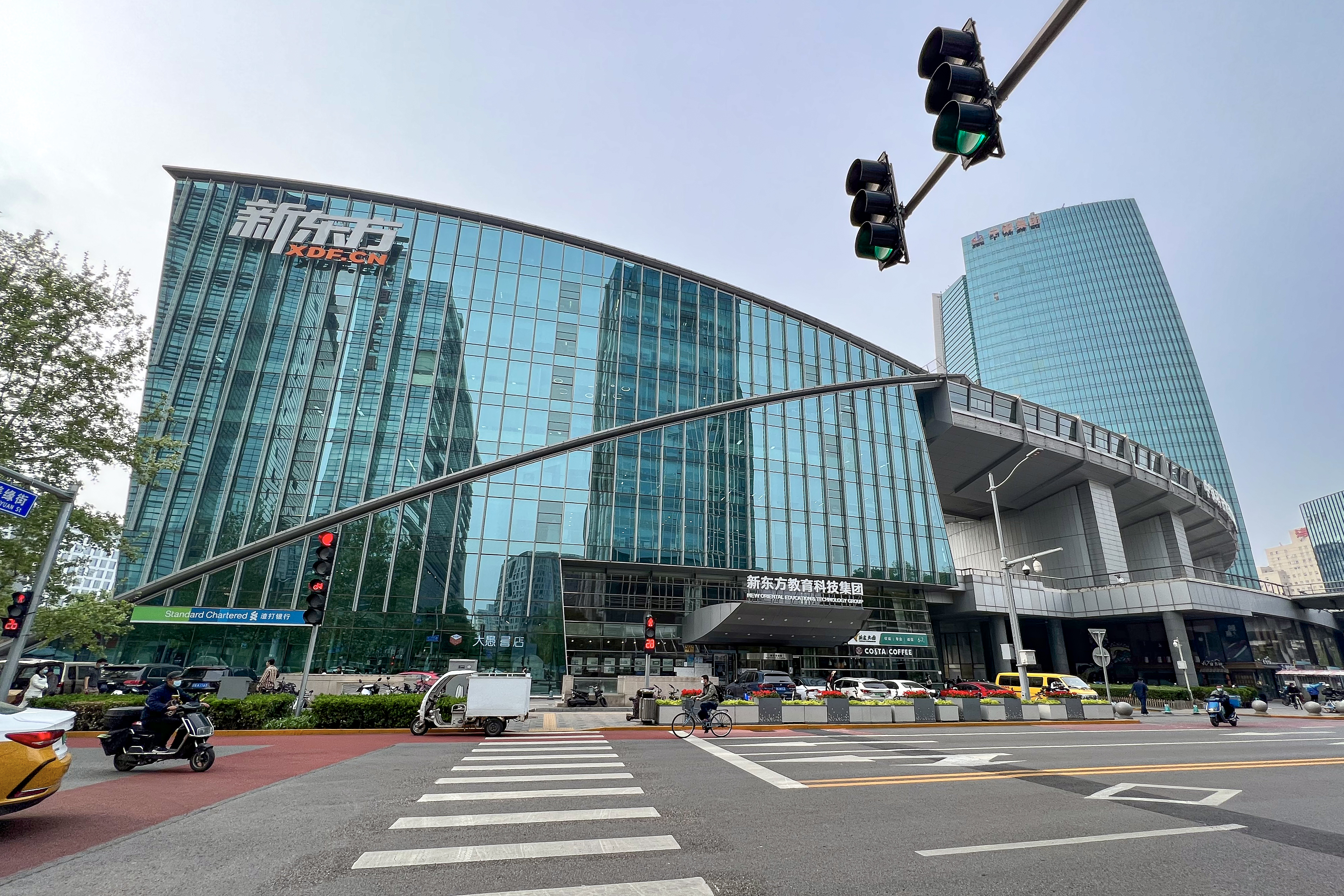
- Headquarters in Zhongguancun, Beijing
- Type: Public
- Traded as: NYSE: EDU; SEHK: 9901
- ISIN: KYG6470A1168
- Founded: 1993
- Headquarters: No.6 Haidian Zhongjie, Haidian District, Beijing (100080)
- Key people: Yu Minhong (CEO) (also known as "Michael Yu")
- Revenue: ▲US$4.90 billion (2025)
- Net income: ▲US$372 million (2025)
- Number of employees: over 17,700 (2016)
- Website: www.neworiental.org

New Oriental
- Simplified Chinese: 新东方教育科技集团
- Traditional Chinese: 新東方教育科技集團
- Literal meaning: New East Direction Education SciTech Conglomerate
Transcriptions
Standard Mandarin
- Hanyu Pinyin: Xīn Dōngfāng Jiàoyù Kējì Jítuán

New Oriental Education & Technology Group Inc. (Chinese: 新东方教育科技集团, NYSE: EDU, SEHK: 9901), more commonly New Oriental (Chinese: 新东方), is a provider of private educational services in China. The headquarters of New Oriental is located in Haidian District, Beijing. As of 2018, it is the largest comprehensive private educational company in China based on the number of program offerings, total student enrollments, and geographic presence. The business of New Oriental includes pre-school education, general courses for students of various age levels, online education, overseas study consulting, and textbook publishing. New Oriental was the first Chinese educational institution to enter the New York Stock Exchange in the United States, holding its IPO in 2006. As of 2016, New Oriental has built 67 short-time language educational schools, 20 book stores, 771 learning centers, and more than 5,000 third-party bookstores in 56 cities in China. New Oriental has had over 26.6 million student enrollments, including over 1.3 million enrollments in first quarter 2017. The company's market capitalization was approximately US$14 billion.

The company has been investing heavily in online education since 2015.

== History ==
Beijing New Oriental School was established on November 16, 1993, by Yu Minhong (aka Michael Yu), a graduate of Peking University with an English major. Prior to venturing into entrepreneurship, Yu Minhong served as an English instructor at Peking University. Initially concentrating on offering preparatory services for the TOEFL and GRE exams, the institution later diversified its offerings to encompass a broad spectrum of test preparation and curriculum. On September 7, 2006, New Oriental was listed on New York Stock Exchange.

== The company ==
As of 2016 there are 67 schools, learning centers, vocational training centers and offices all over Mainland China. The Overseas Tests Department generates the company's main source of revenue, which focuses on preparing students for the TOEFL, SAT, ACT GRE, GMAT, IELTS and LSAT. The company also offers other services including Domestic Tests, Adult English, Language Learning (Japanese, Spanish, French), and Vacation Training.

== Key people ==
Yu Minhong (b. October 15, 1962; also known as "Michael Yu") served as CEO from 2001 to 2016, and has been chairman of the board of directors since 2001. Prior to founding New Oriental in 1993, Yu was an English instructor at Peking University from 1985 to 1991. Yu also serves as Standing Committee Member of the Central Committee of the China Democratic League.

Louis Hsieh served as New Oriental's chief financial officer from 2005 to 2015, and president from 2009 to 2016.

== Legal conflicts with ETS ==
In 2001, the US Educational Testing Service sent a public letter to US universities, reminding them to pay special attention to Chinese students' GRE scores. In this letter, ETS hinted that New Oriental used their past exam questions in teaching without authorization.

In January 2001, New Oriental was sued by the ETS for illegally copying, publishing, and selling its testing questions for examinations for non-English-speaking students since 1997. On September 27, 2003, the First Intermediate People's Court of Beijing made a ruling during the first trial, ordering the Chinese school to pay over 10 million yuan (about 1.2 million US dollars) to the ETS in compensation for the infringement.

The Higher People's Court of Beijing maintained that the Beijing-based New Oriental School (NOS) should pay compensation to the ETS, for the infringement of copy and trademark rights. However, the higher court reduced the sum of compensation by over 6 million yuan (about 722,000 US dollars) to 3,740,186.2 yuan (about 450,624 US dollars) plus 22,000 yuan (about 2,650 US dollars) for court charges.

== E-Commerce ==
=== Transformation ===
In July 2016, New Oriental expanded its online tutoring market to third- and fourth-tier cities with its new platform Koolearn. As of May 31, 2021, Koolearn had entered 273 cities in 27 provinces in China.

On March 28, 2019, Koolearn was listed on the Hong Kong Stock Exchange with the stock code 01797.

Starting in September 2021, Chinese authorities banned for-profit tutoring in subjects on the school curriculum in an effort to ease pressure on children and parents, leading to a wave of school closures and lay offs across the private education sector. As of January 2022, New Oriental dismissed 60,000 employees and saw operating income plunge by 80% after Beijing enforced new sweeping rules on the country's private education industry that barred for-profit tutoring last year, according to its founder.

On December 28, 2021, New Oriental launched its live streaming E-Commerce platform "Oriental Select" on Douyin, the Chinese version of TikTok, positioning itself as a new-era e-commencer for agricultural products. Koolearn Technology Holding has been transformed into an online retail company, and was later renamed East Buy. The company pivoted to leverage the educational background and presentation skills of its former teachers, like Dong Yuhui, in its new e-commerce venture.

=== Success and Expansion ===
East Buy's unique approach to e-commerce, utilizing former teachers as livestream hosts, proved successful. The company planned to diversify its operations, including starting live streaming on Alibaba Group's Taobao platform and developing on multiple platforms like Douyin and its mobile application. East Buy's live e-commerce business was predicted to exceed a gross merchandise volume of CNY 10 billion (approximately USD 1.4 billion) in the fiscal year of 2023.

=== Dispute and Resolution involving Dong Yuhui ===
The controversy surrounding star live-streamer Dong Yuhui and East Buy developed between December 5 to December 18, 2023. The headline incident originated when East Buy's official Douyin account revealed that their promotional script on the live streaming were a collaborative effort, contradicting the belief among Dong's fans that he was the sole creator. This disclosure sparked intense online debates and a backlash, leading to an apology from New Oriental's founder Yu Minhong and former CEO Sun Dongxu for internal management mishandling, which resulted in a significant loss of followers and a drop in East Buy's stock prices. In reaction, Dong's fans boycotted Oriental Select and shifted their support to competitor Gaotu, accusing East Buy's team of attempting to claim credit for Dong's work. In response to the escalating controversy, Sun Dongxu emphasized that Dong was not mistreated and condemned the aggressive "fandom culture," while Dong clarified that the scripts were a collaborative creation. Despite these efforts, the company faced a further decline in followers and stock value, leading to Sun Dongxu's dismissal and Yu Minhong temporarily taking over as CEO.

Amidst these tumultuous events, Dong Yuhui confirmed his continued association with East Buy during a live session with Yu Minhong. Meanwhile, East Buy announced that Dong would return to live-streaming on December 18 as a senior partner of the company. In a separate statement, the parent company announced that Dong was being promoted to assistant of culture to the chairman and would double as vice-president at New Oriental Culture and Tourism Group. East Buy shares rose more than 21 per cent on trading Monday.

== See also ==
- American Dreams in China, a movie about the company
- Andrew Left
- Dong Yuhui, notable figure with New Oriental
- Yu Minhong, founder
