= Yu Minhong =

Chinese entrepreneur (born 1962)

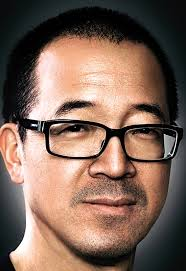
- Yu Minhong, founder and president of New Oriental Education & Technology Group Inc.
- Born: September 4, 1962 (age 63); Xianggang Subdistrict, Jiangyin, Jiangsu, China
- Other name: Michael Yu
- Education: Peking University
- Occupations: Founder and President of New Oriental Education & Technology Group Inc.; Vice President of the Education Committee of Central Committee of China Democratic League; Member of Standing Committee of China Youth Federation; Vice President of Chinese Young Entrepreneur Council; Co-founder of Hong Tai Fund; President of council of Gengdan Institute of Beijing University of Technology
- Known for: The Relentless Pursuit of Success
- Political party: China Democratic League
- Children: 2
- Awards: China's 50 Most Influential Business Leaders (2012); CCTV Annual Economic Figures (2009)

Chinese name
- Chinese: 俞敏洪
Transcriptions
Standard Mandarin
- Hanyu Pinyin: Yú Mǐnhóng

Yu Minhong, or Michael Yu (Chinese: 俞敏洪; born 4 September 1962) is the founder and president of New Oriental Education & Technology Group Inc., and a member of the central committee of China Democratic League. As the owner of one of the largest private educational services, Yu is known as the "richest teacher in China", and "Godfather of English Training". On Hurun Report's China Rich List 2013, he had an estimated wealth $1.1 billion and was ranked No. 245 on the list. On the same list of 2015, he had an estimated wealth of $1.09 billion and was ranked No. 487. Also he was ranked No.1759 on Hurun Global Rich List 2015, with an estimated wealth of $1.1 billion. As of November 2018, he is ranked #148 on Forbes China Rich List 2018 and #1020 on Forbes Billionaires 2018, with an estimated net worth of $1.7 billion.

Approximately 70% of Chinese students studying in the United States and Canada have taken English classes from the firm. In addition, the online education section has attracted more than 2 million registered users since beginning in 2003. New Oriental was the first Chinese private education company to list shares on the New York Stock Exchange.

Yu stated, "My biggest dream is to found a private university, and for it to be one of China's top educational institutions after 40–50 years of development. When applying for higher education, my dream is for the best high school graduates to take my university into consideration, along with the likes of Tsinghua and Beijing University."

Yu is a member of the Standing Committee of the China Democratic League.

== Early life ==
Yu Minhong was born in a rural family in Xiagang Subdistrict of Jiangyin, Jiangsu on September 4, 1962. He has an elder sister. Unlike for the time, Yu's mother encouraged him to go to school. Yu twice failed the university qualification exam and lost a year from illness. Yu was eventually admitted to Beijing University.

Yu was placed in a class for sub-standard students, because he couldn't speak standard Chinese. Yu was a poor student, both financially and academically. In his junior year, pneumonia forced him to take a year off. After graduation in 1985, many classmates went abroad for further education, Yu began to apply for US universities while teaching English in Beijing University. After three years, Yu was accepted by a university. His requests for overseas study visas were repeatedly denied.

== New Oriental ==
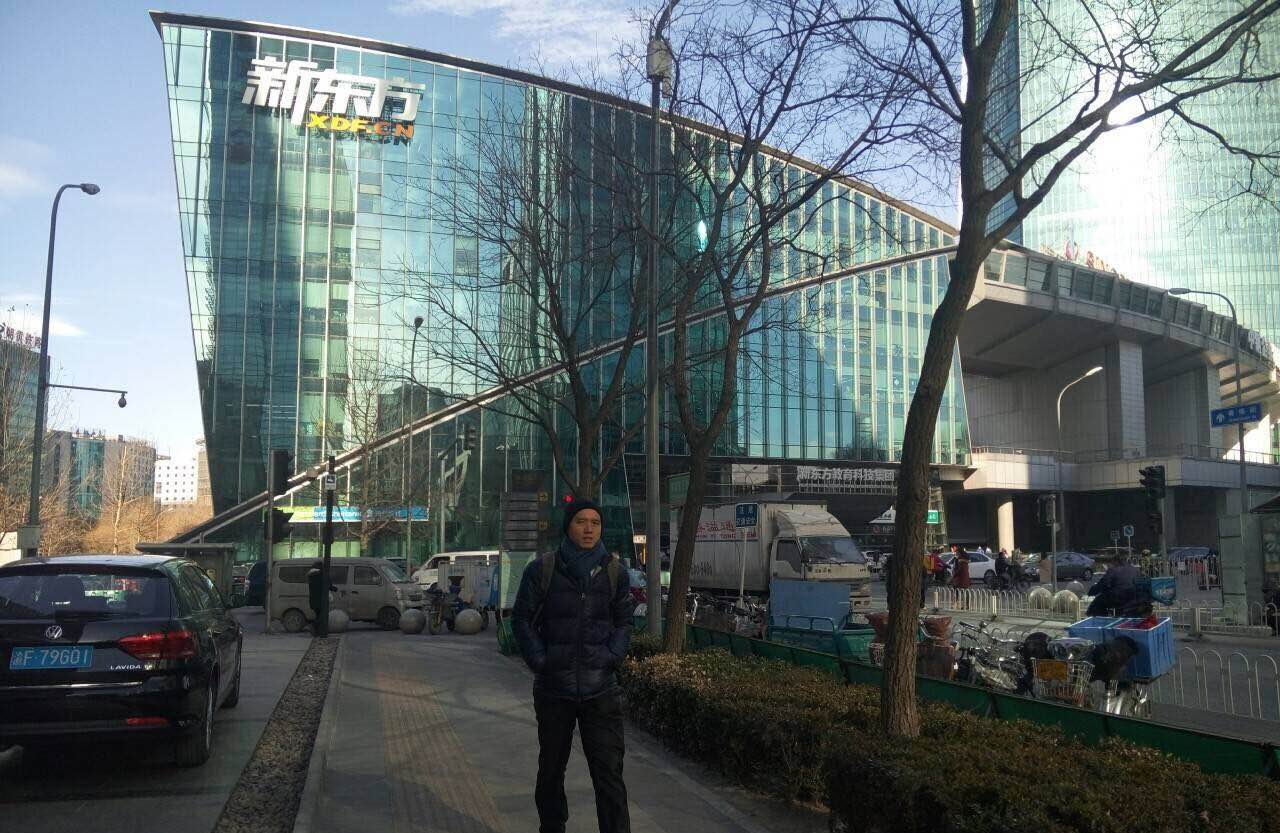

As the largest provider of private educational services in China, New Oriental offers educational programs including English and other foreign languages, overseas and domestic test preparation courses, tutoring, primary and secondary school education and online education. New Oriental's instruction combines humorous, interactive teaching techniques with traditional Chinese educational values. Yu Minhong once emphasized his idea of "rediscovery", which included New Oriental's self-positioning among the private sector of China's education area, and Chinese international students' discovering and rediscovering of themselves and their homeland. All of these have been based on the background of overseas tide and China's unprecedented development in the past decades. Yu Minhong with his New Oriental has always been arguing that they not only provide students with academic training, but also give inspirations.

=== Foundation ===
New Oriental School was established on November 16, 1993. Yu Minhong was the only English teacher at the beginning. As enrollment grew, Yu persuaded some of his former classmates to work with him. One of them, Wang Qiang has a master's degree from the State University of New York. "I took Yu Minhong to Princeton University to show him around the campus. To my surprise, almost every Chinese student recognized him. They would call him 'Teacher Yu'. I was amazed to see how famous he was." Said Wang Qiang.

=== Development ===
Yu converted the business into the New Oriental Education and Technology Group. In 2010 it was the largest private educational enterprise in China, with approximately 10.5 million enrollment, 465 learning centers in 44 cities and 29 bookstores. As of November 30, 2015, New Oriental had a network of 63 schools, 720 (includes 63 schools) learning centers, 25 New Oriental bookstores and over 5,000 third-party bookstores and over 17,000 teachers in 53 cities, as well as an online network with approximately 11.9 million registered users. Many start-up online education companies claimed they would overthrow New Oriental, whose advantages lie mainly in offline education. Facing the challenge, New Oriental and Yu Minhong have confidence in participating in innovations.

On September 7, 2006, the New Oriental Education and Technology Group listed on the New York Stock Exchange. Yu was then labeled "China's richest teacher" with wealth of US$800 million. Other early founders who returned from abroad, and educators in New Oriental with employee stock rights also got rich overnight. To get listed, Yu Minhong initiated reforms on corporate governance aimed at downplaying his personal influence on New Oriental, establishing himself as a professional manager with the group. On the other hand, the listing of New Oriental represented a trend of education industrialization in China. Yu Minhong held that New Oriental's model would not be a get-rich-quick scheme, while mixed responses had been aroused.

== Other careers ==
=== Private higher education ===
Yu Minhong started carrying out his ideal to found a top private university by taking over Gengdan Institute of Beijing University of Technology. The institute was founded in July 2005 under the joint sponsoring of Beijing University of Technology and Beijing Gengdan Education Development Center. It is an independent undergraduate institution which operates under a new education mechanism and a mode of private tertiary education in China. Yu Minhong was elected as the president of council with Gengdan Institute on August 6, 2013, and entered private sector of Chinese higher education based on New Oriental's existing strength.

=== Angel investment ===
After investments in several Chinese funds (including the other two of the founders of New Oriental-Xu Xiaoping and Wang Qiang's Zhenfund), Yu Minhong didn't feel the joys of investment, so in 2014, he decided to set up an angel investment fund together with Sheng Xitai, an old hand in PE industry. The fund was named Hong Tai Fund (or Angel Plus) and focused on the angel and early-stage projects in media, culture, education, entertainment as well as high-tech and mobile Internet industries. It also had plans to invest in Silicon Valley.

== Anecdotes ==
=== Film: American Dreams in China ===
In 2013, a Chinese film named American Dreams in China was released and became a hot topic across China. The movie was directed by famous Hong Kong director Peter Chan and was allegedly based on the self-development and entrepreneurial experience of Yu Minhong ("Cheng Dongqing"), Xu Xiaoping ("Meng Xiaojun"), and Wang Qiang ("Wang Yang"), under the context of China from the 1980s till now. Yu Minhong admitted that basically, he was the prototype of Cheng Dongqing, but denied that the character based on him was common. He claimed that no investment was made to the film by New Oriental.

=== First film show ===
Yu Minhong appeared as a guest performer in a Chinese documentary film named Mr.Deng Goes to Washington, which was released in 2015. The film recorded the nine days beginning on January 29, 1979, when China's leader Deng Xiaoping made his historic visit to the United States, only one month after that country established diplomatic relations with China. On April 24, 2015, at the film's press conference, and in his office building in northwest Beijing, Yu Minhong promoted this documentary film, by promising that both his employees and he, himself would buy tickets to watch it.

== Personal life ==
Yu is married and has a son and a daughter. His wife and daughter immigrated to Canada in 1995.

== Speech ==
In a speech Yu stated:

Hew a stone of hope out of a mountain of despair and you can make your life a splendid one.

In the beginning, there were no roads in the world; only as people began traveling did roads come into being. Successful roads are formed not when people roam aimlessly, but when they are headed in the same direction. The same is true for New Oriental; it was formed as people gathered to study. And like a successful road, it did not achieve its success by chance. People who shared dreams and aspirations worked together to forge an exciting trail.

The road ahead will be even longer and more arduous, because our goals are even grander. But with a clear mission, dedicated hearts and the pioneering spirit that has driven us from the beginning, we're certain that our strength, wisdom, and energy will enable us to write a new page in the records of China's educational undertaking.
