= Peking University Third Hospital =

Coordinates: 39.982148°N 116.359619°E

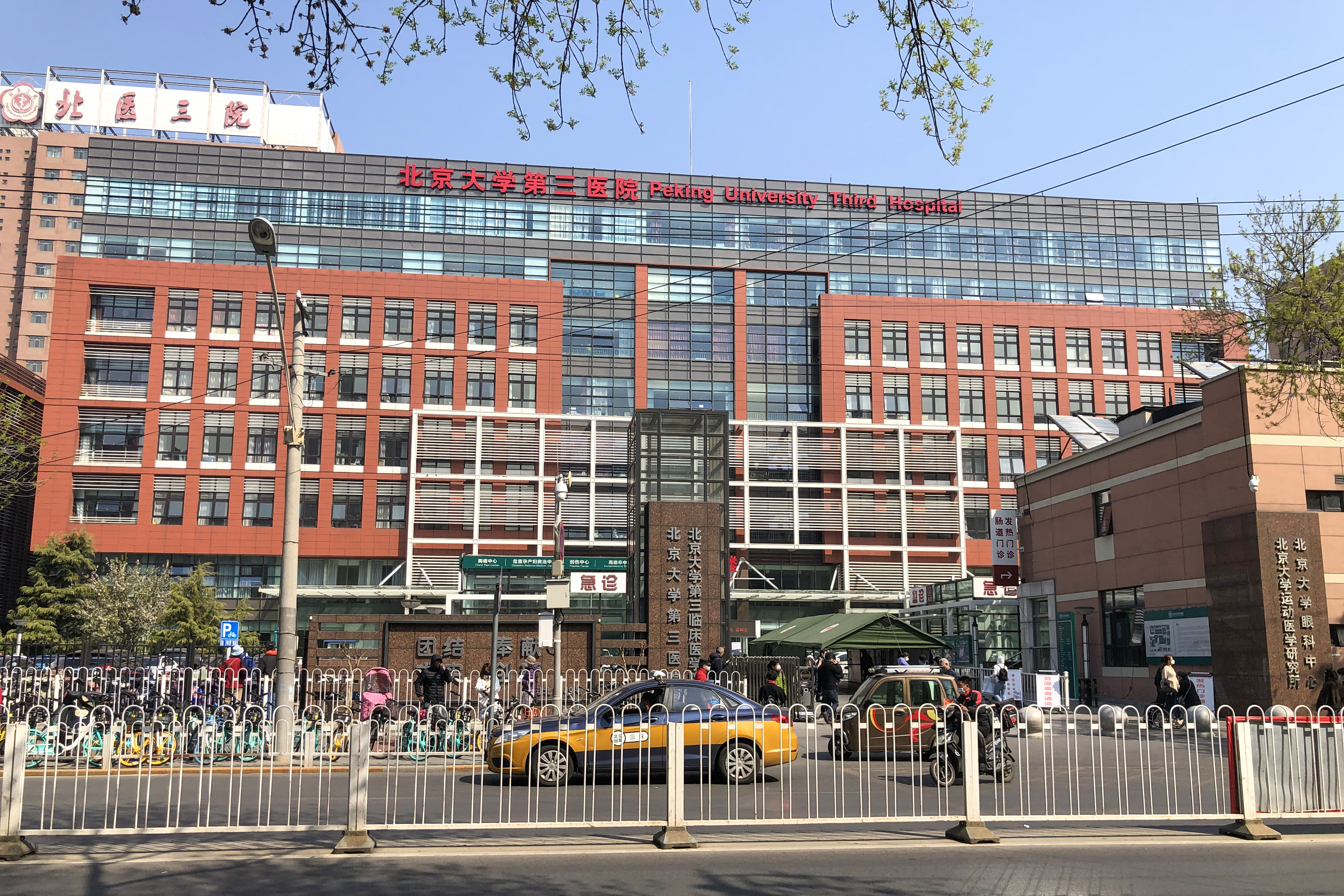

Geography
- Location: 49 Huayuan North Road, Huayuanlu Subdistrict, Haidian District, Beijing, China

Organisation
- Care system: public hospital
- Type: Teaching, District General
- Affiliated university: Peking University

Services
- Emergency department: Yes
- Beds: 1,264

History
- Founded: 1958; 68 years ago

Links
- Website: www.puh3.net.cn
- Lists: Hospitals in China

Peking University Third Hospital (PUTH, PUH3, Chinese: 北京大学第三医院) is a public district general hospital that was founded in 1958 under the supervision of the Ministry of Health. It is affiliated with Peking University, has 36 clinical departments, and 1,752 clinic beds. The hospital is a combination of medical services, medical education/teaching, research and prevention as well as health care, comprehensive hospital in the first-rate of three levels that set by China government.

== Overview ==
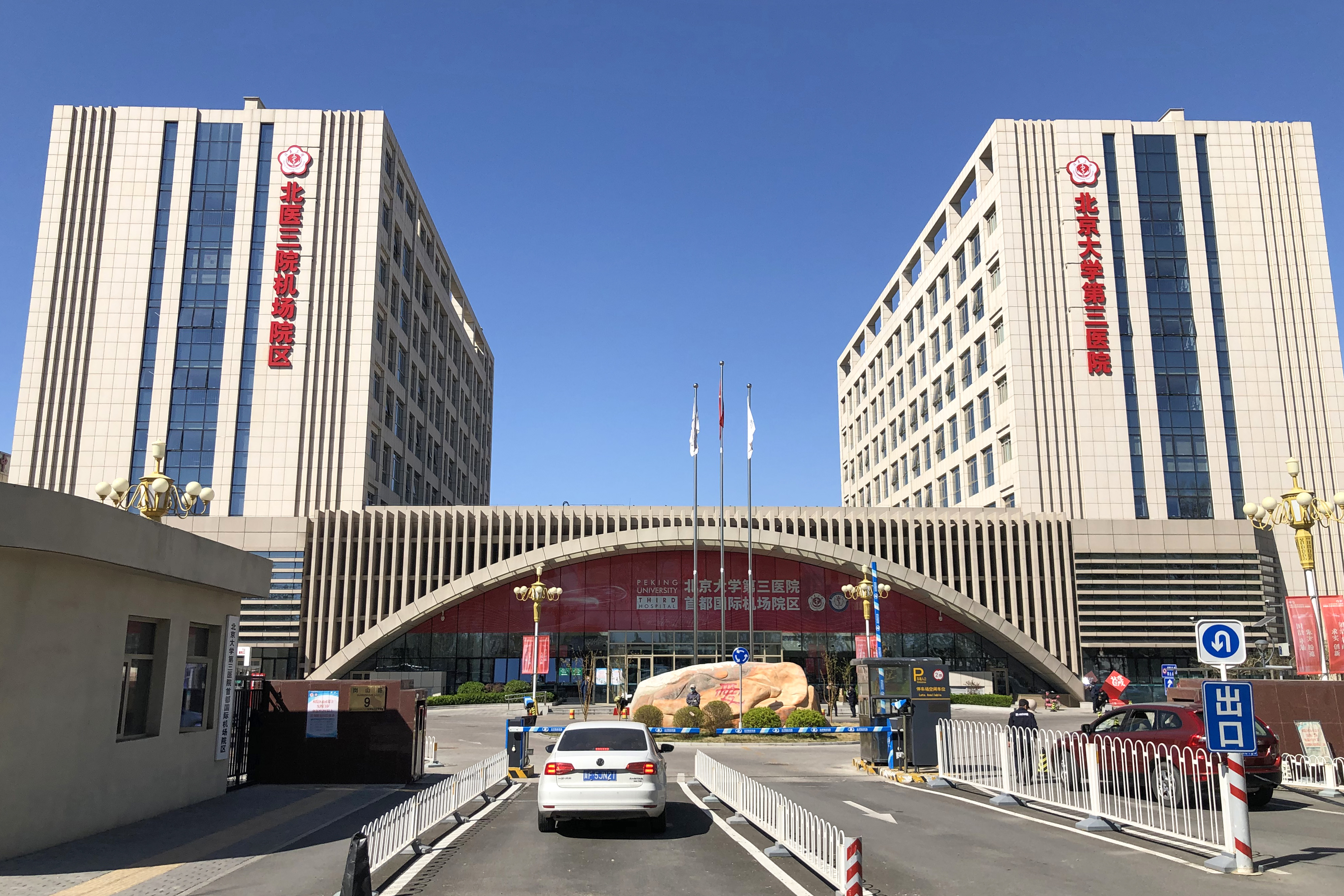
Peking University Third Hospital Capital Airport branch

It is a designated hospital that served the 2008 Olympics, with a staff of 2,295. It has 1,752 clinic beds and 36 clinic departments. Its Reproductive Medicine Center is not only the earliest founded but also the largest in Asia; its Spinal Surgery Department is highly regarded in mainland China, and it is the only center designated to treat athletes by the Chinese Olympic Committee. Its Cardiology Department is one of the best in China, and has the key lab for molecular cardiology of the China Education Department. It specializes in Ophthalmology, Digestive Medicine, treatment for early-stage Gastric Cancer, Plastic Surgery, and Occupational Diseases, and is among the top in China.

Peking University Third Hospital has been supplied with a range of medical equipment, including CT, SPECT, MRI, new vascular angiography, stereo angiography, color Doppler for heart, abdominal color ultrasound, electronic video camera, ultrasound endoscope, external stone crusher, isotope renography, autobiochemistry analysis machine, radio-immunity test instrument, renal dialysis, and a laser treatment machine. This equipment plays a role in examining and diagnosing diseases.

The hospital plays a very important role in teaching as well. Its teaching tasks include Clinical Medicine, Pharmacy, Nursing, Lab Medicine and Preventive Medicine. It also trains a huge number of post-graduates and medical observers. Its 15 departments are assigned training tasks for general medical specialists in Beijing, and 11 departments for a sub-specialist training base.

== Scope of service ==
Clinical departments:

- Cardiology Department
- Respiratory Medicine Department
- Endocrinology and Metabolism Department
- Nephrology Department
- Hematology Department
- Gastroenterology Department
- Rheumatology and Immunology Department
- Geriatrics Department
- Neurology Department
- Infectious Diseases Department
- Emergency Department
- Dermatology Department
- Traditional Chinese Medicine Department
- Occupational Disease Department
- Radiation Oncology Department
- Pediatrics Department
- General Surgery Department
- Orthopaedic Department
- Plastic Department
- Urology Department
- Thoracic surgery Department
- Critical Care Medicine Department
- Neurosurgery Department
- Interventional Radiology and Vascular Surgery Department
- Gynecology and obstetrics Department
- Institute of Sports Medicine
- Rehabilitation Medicine Department
- Critical Care Medicine Department
- Reproductive Medicine Center
- Ophthalmology Department (Eye Center)
- ENT Department
- Stomatology Department

Medical technology departments:

- Ultrasound Diagnosis Department
- Nuclear Medicine Department
- Radiology Department
- Blood Transfusion Department
- Pharmacy Department
- Laboratory Medicine Department
- Pathology Department
- Medical Record Departmentment
- Operation Theatre
- Clinical Nutrition Department

External divisions

- The C.P.C. Central Committee Party School Branch Of Peking University Hospital
- The Second Clinic Of Peking University Third Hospital
