= List of members of the Chinese Academy of Sciences =

At the Chinese Academy of Sciences, new members are elected biennially. Before 2014 only a maximum of 60 members could be inducted each time, but this restriction has since been removed by new bylaws. The candidates are nominated by current members or academic groups, although foreign members and senior members cannot nominate new candidates. Self nomination is also not allowed. Available candidates are approved by presidiums of academic divisions. Elections are held by secret ballots, and about 20% of the candidates are elected.

The membership system has been criticized as highly bureaucratic. Academicians receive government benefits equivalent to those enjoyed by vice-ministerial level officials. Additionally, academicians can receive numerous subsidies from the local governments in addition to statutory subsidies. Their opinions may carry more weight, which sometimes leads to academic monopolization.

As of September 2014, there are 738 living academicians across different divisions. 141 members constitute the Division of Mathematics and Physics, 126 in the Division of Chemistry, 136 in the Division of Life Sciences and Medicine, 122 in the Division of Earth Sciences, 86 in the Division of Information Technical Sciences, and 131 in the Division of Technological Sciences. 507 former members are deceased. 94% of the members are male, and 6% are female.

== Division of Mathematics and Physics ==
1955

- Chen Jiangong
- Duan Xuefu
- Ge Tingsui
- Hu Ning
- Hua Luogeng
- Huang Kun
- Jiang Zehan
- Ke Zhao
- Li Guoping
- Lu Xueshan
- Ma Dayou
- Peng Huanwu
- Qian Linzhao
- Qian Sanqiang
- Qian Weichang
- Rao Yutai
- Shi Ruwei
- Su Buqing
- Wang Ganchang
- Wang Xianghao
- Wang Zhuxi
- Wu Youxun
- Xu Baolu
- Yan Jici
- Ye Qisun
- Yu Ruihuang
- Zhang Yuzhe
- Zhao Zhongyao
- Zhou Peiyuan
- Zhou Tongqing

1957

- Guo Yonghuai
- Qian Xuesen
- Wang Dezhao
- Wu Wenjun
- Zhang Wenyu
- Zhang Zongsui

1980

- Chen Biao
- Chen Jingrun
- Cheng Kaijia
- Cheng Minde
- Dai Chuanzeng
- Dai Yuanben
- Deng Jiaxian
- Fang Lizhi (rescinded in 1989)
- Feng Duan
- Feng Kang
- Gu Chaohao
- Guan Weiyan
- Guan Zhaozhi
- Hao Bailin
- He Zehui
- He Zuoxiu
- Hong Chaosheng
- Hu Jimin
- Hu Shihua
- Huang Zuqia
- Jiang Boju
- Jin Jianzhong
- Li Lin
- Li Yinyuan
- Li Zhengwu
- Lin Tongji
- Lu Hefu
- Lu Qikeng
- Qu Qinyue
- Shen Yuan
- Tan Gaosheng
- Tang Xiaowei
- Wang Chengshu
- Wang Shouguan
- Wang Yuan
- Wei Rongjue
- Wu Shishu
- Xia Daoxing
- Xiao Jian
- Xie Jialin
- Xie Xide
- Xu Xurong
- Yang Chengzhong
- Yang Le
- Ye Shuhua
- Yu Min
- Zhang Zong
- Zhou Guangzhao
- Zhu Guangya
- Zhu Hongyuan
- Zhuang Fenggan

1991

- Bai Yilong
- Chen Jiansheng
- Ding Dazhao
- Ding Xiaqi
- Fan Haifu
- Fang Shouxian
- Gan Zizhao
- Guo Zhongheng
- Hu Hesheng
- Hu Renyu
- Huang Shengnian
- Jing Fuqian
- Li Deping
- Li Jiaming
- Liao Shantao
- Lü Min
- Min Naiben
- Pan Chengdong
- Pu Fuke
- Shi Zhongci
- Su Dingqiang
- Su Zhaobing
- Tang Dingyuan
- Wan Zhexian
- Wang Yening
- Wang Zikun
- Xi Dingchang
- Xi Zezong
- Xiong Darun
- Xu Zhizhan
- Yang Fujia
- Yang Liming
- Zhang Gongqing
- Zhang Hanxin
- Zhang Renhe
- Zhang Shuyi
- Zhao Zhongxian
- Zhou Yulin

1993

- Ai Guoxiang
- Chen Jia'er
- Huo Yuping
- Li Fanghua
- Lin Qun
- Wang Naiyan
- Wu Hangsheng
- Yan Zhida
- Ying Chongfu
- Zhou Heng

1995

- Cai Shidong
- Fang Cheng
- Guo Shangping
- He Xiantu
- Li Daqian
- Liu Yingming
- Ma Zhiming
- Shen Xuechu
- Wei Baowen
- Zheng Houzhi

1997

- Chen Nanxian
- Chen Xiru
- Ding Weiyue
- Li Tibei
- Ouyang Zhongcan
- Sun Yisui
- Tong Binggang
- Yang Yingchang
- Zhang Huanqiao

1999

- Cui Erjie
- Huang Runqian
- Shen Wenqing
- Wang Shiji
- Wang Xun
- Wen Lan
- Yan Jia'an
- Yang Guozhen
- Yu Lu
- Zhang Zongye

2001

- Chen Shigang
- Guo Boling
- Li Banghe
- Tian Gang
- Wang Chenghao
- Ye Zhaohui
- Zhang Dianlin
- Zhao Guangda
- Zhou Youyuan
- Zou Guangtian

2003

- Chen Mufa
- Ge Molin
- Hong Jiaxing
- Kuang Yuping
- Li Jiachun
- Lu Tan
- Tao Ruibao
- Xie Sishen
- Zhang Jie
- Zhu Bangfen

2005

- Chen Hesheng
- Gong Changde
- Peng Shige
- Wang Dingsheng
- Wang Shicheng
- Zan Wenlong
- Zhang Jialü
- Zhang Yuheng

2007

- Long Yiming
- Wang Enge
- Wu Yueliang
- Xing Dingyu
- Yu Changxuan
- Zhang Weiping

2009

- Cui Xiangqun
- Li Anmin
- Luo Jun
- Sun Changpu
- Xi Nanhua
- Zheng Xiaojing

2011

- Chen Yongchuan
- E Weinan
- Gao Hongjun
- Pan Jianwei
- Wang Guanghou
- Wu Xiangping
- Yuan Yaxiang
- Zhang Weiyan
- Zhang Zhaoxi

2013

- Chen Shiyi
- Chen Shuxing
- Li Jianshu
- Ouyang Qi
- Sun Xin
- Wang Jingxiu
- Xiang Tao
- Zhao Zhengguo
- Zhou Xiangyu

2015

- Chen Xianhui
- Deng Xiaogang
- Du Jiangfeng
- Jiang Song
- Jing Yipeng
- Luo Minxing
- Mok Ngaiming
- Wang Yifang
- Xie Xincheng
- Zhang Pingwen
- Zhu Shiyao

2017

- Cai Ronggen
- Chen Zhiming
- Fang Fuquan
- Gong Xingao
- Han Zhanwen
- He Guowei
- Li Ruxin
- Ma Yugang
- Tang Tao
- Wang Xiaoyun
- Xu Hongxing
- Yang Chen-Ning

2019

- Chang Jin
- Chang Kai
- Fang Zhong
- Gao Yuanning
- Lin Haiqing
- Lu Xiyun
- Sun Binyong
- Tang Chao
- Ye Xiangdong
- Zhang Jiping
- Zhao Hongwei

2023

- Tian Ye

== Division of Chemistry ==
1955

- Fu Ying
- Hou Xianglin
- Huang Minlon
- Huang Ziqing
- Hui Ziqiang
- Ji Yufeng
- Li Fangxun
- Liang Shuquan
- Liu Dagang
- Lu Jiaxi
- Qian Zhidao
- Tang Aoqing
- Wang You
- Wu Xuezhou
- Yang Shixian
- Yu Hongzheng
- Yuan Hanqing
- Zeng Zhaolun
- Zhang Dayu
- Zhang Qinglian
- Zhao Chenggu
- Zhuang Changgong

1957

- Cai Liusheng
- Zhao Zong'ao

1980

- Cai Qirui
- Cao Benxi
- Chen Guanrong
- Chen Jiayong
- Chen Rongti
- Chen Ruyu
- Dai Anbang
- Feng Xinde
- Gao Hong
- Gao Jiyu
- Gao Xiaoxia
- Gao Yisheng
- Gao Zhenheng
- Gu Yidong (顾翼东)
- Guo Musun
- Guo Xiexian
- He Binglin
- Huang Liang
- Huang Weiyuan
- Huang Yaozeng
- Ji Ruyun
- Jiang Lijin
- Jiang Mingqian
- Liang Xiaotian
- Liu Youcheng
- Lu Peizhang
- Min Enze
- Ni Jiazuan
- Peng Shaoyi
- Qian Baogong
- Qian Renyuan
- Shen Panwen
- Shen Tianhui
- Shi Jun
- Su Yuanfu
- Tang Youqi
- Tian Zhaowu
- Wang Baoren
- Wang Dexi
- Wang Jiading
- Wang Xu
- Wu Chi
- Wu Haoqing
- Wu Zhengkai
- Xiao Lun
- Xing Qiyi
- Xu Guangxian
- Yan Dongsheng
- Zha Quanxing
- Zhang Cunhao
- Zhu Yajie

1991

- Chen Junwu
- Chen Minheng (rescinded in 1999)
- Chen Yaozu
- Cheng Rongshi
- Guo Jingkun
- He Guozhong
- Huang Baotong
- Huang Zhitang
- Jiang Shengjie
- Jiang Xikui
- Jiang Yuansheng
- Li Lemin
- Liu Yuanfang
- Lou Nanquan
- Lu Wanzhen
- Lu Xiyan
- Shen Jiacong
- Sun Jiazhong
- Wang Erkang
- Wang Fangding
- Wang Fosong
- Wang Kui
- Xie Yuyuan
- Xu Ruren
- Xu Xi
- You Xiaozeng
- Yu Guozong
- Yu Ruqin
- Yuan Quan
- Zhang Pang
- Zhang Qian'er
- Zhao Yufen
- Zhou Jishan
- Zhou Tonghui
- Zhu Qingshi

1993

- Chen Jianyuan
- Dai Lixin
- Deng Conghao
- Hu Ying
- Huang Benli
- Liang Jingkui
- Lin Liwu
- Lin Shangan
- Qing-Yun Chen
- Yin Zhiwen

1995

- Chi-Ming Che
- Deng Jingfa
- He Mingyuan
- Hu Hongwen
- Shen Zhiquan
- Su Qiang
- Xu Xiaobai
- Zhang Lihe
- Zhu Qihe

1997

- Bai Chunli
- Fang Zhaolun
- Gao Shiyang
- Hou Yujun
- Qian Yitai
- Sha Guohe
- Wan Huilin
- Yuan Chengye
- Zhu Daoben
- Zhuo Renxi

1999

- Chen Kaixian
- Huang Naizheng
- Li Jinghai
- Liu Ruozhuang
- Tong Zhenhe
- Wu Xintao
- Yao Shouzhuo
- Zhou Qifeng

2001

- Cao Yong
- Albert Chan (Chen Xinzi)
- Chen Hongyuan
- Cheng Jinpei
- Huang Chunhui
- Jiang Long
- Lin Guoqiang
- Mai Songwei
- Vivian Yam (Ren Yonghua)
- Zheng Lansun

2003

- Fei Weiyang
- Hong Maochun
- Hou Jianguo
- Huang Xian
- Ji Liangnian
- Li Can
- Wu Qi
- Wu Yangjie
- Yang Yuliang
- Zhang Yukui

2005

- Chen Yi
- Feng Shouhua
- Jiang Ming
- Li Hongzhong
- Ma Shengming
- Tian Zhongqun
- Wu Yundong
- Yan Deyue
- Yao Jiannian

2007

- Chai Zhifang
- Duan Xue
- Gao Song
- Song Licheng
- Zhang Xi
- Zhao Dongyuan

2009

- Bao Xinhe
- Chen Xiaoming
- Jiang Guibin
- Jiang Lei
- Tang Benzhong
- Tu Yongqiang
- Wan Lijun
- Zhou Qilin

2011

- Li Yadong
- Liu Zhongfan
- Tian He
- Yan Chunhua
- Yang Xueming
- Zhang Lina
- Zhao Jincai

2013

- Ding Kuiling
- Fang Weihai
- Feng Xiaoming
- Han Buxing
- Li Yongfang
- Xie Yi
- Yang Xiurong
- Zhang Hongjie
- Zhang Tao

2015

- An Lijia
- Li Yuliang
- Liu Yunqi
- Sun Shigang
- Tan Weihong
- Tang Yong
- Xi Zhenfeng
- Yu Jihong
- Zhang Suojiang

2017

- Chen Jun
- Guo Zijian
- Peng Xiaojun
- Xie Zaiku
- Xie Zuowei
- Yang Wantai
- Yue Jianmin
- Zhang Donghui
- Zhao Yuliang

2019

- Chen Xuesi
- Fan Chunhai
- Li Jinghong
- Ma Dawei
- Shi Jianlin
- Wu Lizhu
- Xu Chunming
- Yang Jinlong
- Yu Shuhong
- Zhang Jin

== Division of Life Sciences and Medicine ==
1955

- Bei Shizhang
- Bing Zhi
- Cai Banghua
- Cai Qiao
- Chen Fengtong
- Chen Huanyong
- Chen Shixiang
- Chen Wengui
- Chen Zhen
- Cheng Dan'an
- Dai Fanglan
- Dai Song'en
- Deng Shuqun
- Ding Ying
- Feng Depei
- Feng Zefang
- Hou Guangjiong
- Hu Jingfu
- Huang Jiasi
- Jin Shanbao
- Li Jidong
- Li Lianjie
- Li Qingkui
- Liang Boqiang
- Liang Xi
- Lin Qiaozhi
- Lin Rong
- Liu Chengzhao
- Liu Chongle
- Luo Zongluo
- Ma Wenzhao
- Pan Shu
- Qian Chongshu
- Qin Renchang
- Shen Qizhen
- Sheng Tongsheng
- Tang Peisong
- Tong Dizhou
- Tu Ye
- Wang Jiaji
- Wang Yinglai
- Wei Xi
- Wu Xianwen
- Wu Yingkai
- Wu Zhengyi
- Xiao Longyou
- Yang Weiyi
- Ye Juquan
- Yin Hongzhang
- Yu Dafu
- Zhang Jingyue
- Zhang Xiaoqian
- Zhang Xijun
- Zhang Zhaoqian
- Zhao Hongzhang
- Zheng Wanjun
- Zhong Huilan
- Zhou Zezhao
- Zhu Futang
- Zhu Xi

1957

- Feng Lanzhou
- Liu Sizhi
- Tang Feifan
- Wang Shanyuan
- Zhang Xiangtong

1980

- Bao Wenkui
- Cai Xu
- Cao Tianqin
- Chen Huakui
- Chen Zhongwei
- Fang Xinfang
- Gao Shangyin
- Hou Xueyu
- Huang Zhenxiang
- Li Jinxiong
- Li Shanghao
- Liang Dongcai
- Liang Zhiquan
- Liu Jiangkang
- Lou Chenghou
- Lu Baolin
- Ma Shijun
- Niu Jingyi
- Pu Zhelong
- Qiu Shibang
- Qiu Weifan
- Shen Shanjiong
- Shen Yungang
- Shi Lüji
- Tan Jiazhen
- Tang Zhongzhang
- Wang Debao
- Wang Fuxiong
- Wang Kunren
- Wang Shizhen
- Wang Zhijun
- Wu Jieping
- Wu Wen
- Wu Zhonglun
- Xie Shaowen
- Xiong Yi
- Xu Guanren
- Yan Xunchu
- Yang Jian
- Yao Zhen
- Yu Dejun
- Zeng Chengkui
- Zhang Zhiyi
- Zhao Shanhuan
- Zheng Guochang
- Zheng Zuoxin
- Zhou Tingchong
- Zhu Jiming
- Zhu Renbao
- Zhu Zuxiang
- Zhuang Xiaohui
- Zou Chenglu
- Zou Gang

1991

- Chen Keji
- Chen Yiyu
- Chen Ziyuan
- Hong Deyuan
- Hong Mengmin
- Ju Gong
- Li Zhensheng
- Liu Xinyuan
- Mao Jiangsen
- Qiang Boqin
- Qin Junde
- Shi Jiaonai
- Shi Liming
- Shi Yuanchun
- Sun Manji
- Tang Chongti
- Tian Bo
- Wu Jianping
- Wu Mengchao
- Xie Lianhui
- Xu Genjun
- Xue Dupu
- Yan Longfei
- Yang Fuyu
- Yang Hanxi
- Yang Hongyuan
- Yang Xiongli
- Yao Kaitai
- Yin Wenying
- Zhai Zhonghe
- Zhang Guangxue
- Zhang Shuzheng
- Zhang Xinshi
- Zhuang Qiaosheng

1993

- Gong Yueting
- Han Jisheng
- Hao Shui
- Li Bo
- Lu Yonggen
- Qiu Fazu
- Sun Ruyong
- Wang Wencai
- Wu Zuze
- Zeng Yi
- Zhu Zhaoliang

1995

- Chen Weifeng
- Chen Yizhang
- Chen Zhu
- Kuang Tingyun
- Li Jilun
- Shen Yunfen
- Tang Shouzheng
- Wu Changxin
- Xu Guojun
- Yin Xiangchu
- Yu Tianren
- Zhang Chunting

1997

- Cao Wenxuan
- Han Qide
- Hong Guofan
- Liu Ruiyu
- Lu Shixin
- Pang Xiongfei
- Shen Ziyin
- Shi Yunyu
- Wang Zhixin
- Wei Jiangchun
- Xu Zhihong
- Zhu Zuoyan

1999

- Jiang Youxu
- Kong Xiangfu
- Li Chaoyi
- Liu Yixun
- Pei Gang
- Qi Zhengwu
- Song Daxiang
- Su Guohui
- Zhang Qifa
- Zheng Ruyong
- Zhou Jun

2001

- Chen Wenxin
- He Fuchu
- Nancy Ip (Ye Yuru)
- Jin Guozhang
- Li Jiayang
- Liang Zhiren
- Sun Daye
- Wang Zhizhen
- Zhang Yonglian
- Zhang Youshang
- Zhao Ermi
- Zheng Shouyi

2003

- Chen Lin
- Fang Rongxiang
- Guo Aike
- Lin Qishui
- Liu Yunyi
- Rao Zihe
- Shen Yan
- Sun Handong
- Wei Yuquan
- Zhang Yaping
- Zheng Guangmei

2005

- Chang Wenrui
- Chen Xiaoya
- Deng Zixin
- Fang Jingyun
- He Lin
- Tong Tanjun
- Wang Dacheng
- Wang Enduo
- Wang Zhengmin
- Wang Zhonggao
- Zeng Yixin
- Zhao Guoping

2007

- Chen Runsheng
- Duan Shumin
- Meng Anming
- Wu Weihua
- Xie Hua'an
- Yang Huanming
- Zhao Jindong

2009

- Hou Fanfan
- Lin Hongxuan
- Shang Yongfeng
- Sui Senfang
- Zhuang Wenyin

2011

- Ge Junbo
- Huang Lusheng
- Kang Le
- Li Lin
- Shu Hongbing
- Zhang Mingjie
- Zhang Xuemin
- Zhao Yupei
- Zhu Yuxian

2013

- Cheng Heping
- Gao Fu
- Gui Jianfang
- Han Bin
- Han Jiahuai
- He Jie
- Jin Li
- Shi Yigong
- Zhao Jizong

2015

- Cao Xiaofeng
- Chen Guoqiang
- Chen Xiaoping
- Chen Yihan
- Li Peng
- Shao Feng
- Song Weibo
- Wang Fusheng
- Xu Guoliang
- Yan Xiyun
- Zhang Xu
- Zhou Qi

2017

- Bian Xiuwu
- Chen Hualan
- Chen Yeguang
- Chong Kang
- Fan Jia
- Gu Dongfeng
- Huang Hefeng
- Ji Weizhi
- Jiang Hualiang
- Liu Yaoguang
- Lu Lin
- Wei Fuwen
- Xu Tao

2019

- Chen Zijiang
- Dong Chen
- Hao Xiaojiang
- Luo Qingming
- Ma Lan
- Qian Qian
- Song Erwei
- Tong Xiaolin
- Wang Songling
- Xie Daoxin

== Division of Earth Sciences ==
1955

- Cheng Yuqi
- Gu Gongxu
- He Zuolin
- Hou Defeng
- Huang Bingwei
- Huang Jiqing
- Le Senxun
- Li Siguang
- Meng Xianmin
- Pei Wenzhong
- Si Xingjian
- Sun Yunzhu
- Tian Qi
- Tu Changwang
- Wu Heng
- Xia Jianbai
- Xie Jiarong
- Xu Jie
- Yang Zhongjian
- Yin Zanxun
- Yu Jianzhang
- Zhang Wenyou
- Zhao Jiuzhang
- Zhu Kezhen (Coching Chu)

1957

- Feng Jinglan
- Fu Chengyi
- Wang Zhuquan

1980

- Chen Guoda
- Chen Shupeng
- Chen Yongling
- Cheng Chunshu
- Chi Jishang
- Ding Guoyu
- Dong Shenbao
- Fang Jun
- Gao Youxi
- Gao Zhenxi
- Gu Dezhen
- Gu Zhiwei
- Guan Shicong
- Guo Chengji
- Guo Wenkui
- Hao Yichun
- Hou Renzhi
- Huang Shaoxian
- Jia Fuhai
- Jia Lanpo
- Li Chunyu
- Li Xingxue
- Liu Dongsheng
- Liu Guangding
- Lu Yanhao
- Ma Xingyuan
- Mao Hanli
- Mu Enzhi
- Qin Xinling
- Ren Mei'e
- Shi Yafeng
- Song Shuhe
- Sun Dianqing
- Tan Qixiang
- Tao Shiyan
- Tu Guangzhi
- Wang Hengsheng
- Wang Hongzhen
- Wang Ren
- Wang Yu
- Wang Yuelun
- Wang Zhizhuo
- Weng Wenbo
- Wu Rukang
- Xie Xuejin
- Xie Yibing
- Xu Keqin
- Xu Ren
- Yang Zunyi
- Ye Duzheng
- Ye Lianjun
- Ye Yezheng
- Yuan Jianqi
- Yue Xixin
- Zeng Qingcun
- Zeng Rongsheng
- Zhang Bingxi
- Zhang Bosheng
- Zhang Zonghu
- Zhao Jinke
- Zhou Lisan
- Zhou Mingzhen
- Zhou Tingru
- Zhu Xia

1991

- An Zhisheng
- Chang Yinfo
- Chen Junyong
- Chen Mengxiong
- Chen Qingxuan
- Chen Yuntai
- Fu Jiamo
- Huang Ronghui
- Li Deren
- Li Desheng
- Li Jijun
- Li Jun
- Liu Baojun
- Ma Zaitian
- Ma Zongjin
- Ouyang Ziyuan
- Shen Qihan
- Sheng Jinzhang
- Su Jilan
- Sun Dazhong
- Sun Honglie
- Sun Shu
- Wang Pinxian
- Wu Chuanjun
- Xiao Xuchang
- Xu Guanhua
- Xu Houze
- Yang Qi
- Ye Danian
- Yuan Daoxian
- Zhang Miman
- Zhao Bolin
- Zhao Qiguo
- Zhou Xiuji
- Zhu Xianmo

1993

- Chen Yong
- Cheng Guodong
- Chou Jifan
- Guo Lingzhi
- Li Tingdong
- Wang Shui
- Wen Shengchang
- Yin Hongfu
- Zhang Shen
- Zhao Pengda

1995

- Chao Jiping
- Dai Jinxing
- Liu Changping
- Liu Zhenxing
- Qin Yunshan
- Wang Jiyang
- Xi Chengfan
- Xu Zhiqin
- Yu Chongwen
- Zhou Zhiyan

1997

- Feng Shizuo
- Lin Xueyu
- Ma Jin
- Ren Jishun
- Rong Jiayu
- Tian Zaiyi
- Tong Qingxi
- Wang Dezi
- Wu Guoxiong
- Zhang Pengxi

1999

- Gao Jun
- Teng Jiwen
- Wu Xinzhi
- Wu Rongsheng
- Xue Yuqun
- Yao Zhenxing
- Zhai Yusheng
- Zhang Benren
- Zhang Guowei
- Zheng Du

2001

- Hu Dunxin
- Jin Yugan
- Li Chongyin
- Li Xiaowen
- Shi Yaolin
- Tu Chuanyi
- Wang Yin
- Xu Shizhe
- Zhong Dalai

2003

- Chen Xu
- Deng Qidong
- Fu Congbin
- Jia Chengzao
- Li Shuguang
- Liu Jiaqi
- Lu Dadao
- Qin Dahe
- Anthony Yeh
- Zhu Rixiang

2005

- Ding Zhongli
- Jin Zhenmin
- Lü Daren
- Qiu Zhanxiang
- Wang Rieguan
- Wei Fengsi
- Yang Wencai

2007

- Mu Mu
- Yang Yuanxi
- Yao Tandong
- Zhang Jing

2009

- Mo Xuanxue
- Tao Shu
- Zhai Mingguo
- Zheng Yongfei
- Weijian Zhou

2011

- Fu Bojie
- Gao Shan
- Gong Jianya
- Guo Huadong
- Jiao Nianzhi
- Liu Congqiang
- Shi Guangyu
- Shu Degan
- Wan Weixing
- Zhou Zhonghe

2013

- Chen Jun
- Cui Peng
- Guo Zhengtang
- Jin Zhijun
- Peng Pingan
- Wang Chengshan
- Wang Huijun
- Wu Lixin
- Zhang Peizhen
- Zhou Chenghu

2015

- Chen Dake
- Chen Fahu
- Chen Xiaofei
- Gao Rui
- Hao Fang
- Shen Shuzhong
- Wu Fuyuan
- Xia Jun
- Yang Shufeng
- Zheng Renhe

2017

- Dai Minhan
- Ding Lin
- Dou Xiankang
- Hou Zengqian
- Pan Yongxin
- Shao Ming'an
- Xu Yigang
- Yang Jingsui
- Zhang Hongfu
- Zou Caineng

2019

- Cheng Qiuming
- Dai Yongjiu
- Li Xianhua
- Peng Jianbing
- Sun Heping
- Wang Chi
- Wang Yanxin
- Xiao Wenjiao
- Yu Guirui
- Zhao Guochun
- Zhu Yongguan

== Division of Information Technical Sciences ==
1955

- Wang Daheng

1980

- Gan Fuxi
- Gao Qingshi
- Huang Hongjia
- Lin Weigan
- Liu Shenggang
- Lu Yuanjiu
- Luo Peilin
- Wang Shoujue
- Wang Shouwu
- Yang Jiachi
- Ye Peida
- Zhang Xu

1991

- Bao Zheng
- Chen Junliang
- Dai Ruwei
- Hou Xun
- Huang Weilu
- Kuang Dingbo
- Li Yanda
- Li Zhijian
- Liu Yongtan
- Mu Guoguang
- Que Duanlin
- Song Jian
- Sun Zhongxiu
- Tang Zhisong
- Wang Qiming
- Wang Xuan
- Wang Yue
- Wang Zhijiang
- Wu Dexin
- Wu Quande
- Xia Peisu
- Yang Fuqing
- Zhang Xiaoxiang
- Zhou Bingkun

1993

- Chen Hanfu
- Dong Yunmei
- Liang Sili
- Zhou Chaochen
- Zhou Xingming

1995

- Feng Chunbo
- Hou Chaohuan
- Jian Shuisheng
- Wang Yangyuan
- Wang Zhanguo
- Zhang Bo
- Zhang Jingzhong

1997

- Lei Xiaolin
- Li Wei
- Li Qihu
- Shen Xubang
- Wang Wei (王圩)
- Wang Yuzhu
- Yao Jianquan
- Zhang Siying

1999

- Chen Xingbi
- Chen Xingdan
- Cheng Yiu-chung
- Lin Huimin
- Liu Songhao
- Lu Ruqian
- Xue Yongqi
- Zhu Zhongliang

2001

- Chen Guilin
- Guo Lei
- Qin Guogang
- Xia Jianbai

2003

- Chen Guoliang
- Guo Guangcan
- Huang Lin
- Lin Zunqi
- Peng Kunchi
- Wu Hongxin
- Zheng Youliao

2005

- Bao Weimin
- Chu Junhao
- He Jifeng
- Huang Minqiang
- Wang Jiaqi
- Wu Peiheng

2007

- Wu Yirong

2009

- Chen Dingchang
- Huai Jinpeng
- Liu Guozhi
- Xu Ningsheng

2011

- Huang Wei
- Jin Yaqiu
- Li Shushen
- Mei Hong
- Xu Zongben
- Yang Xuejun
- Zheng Jianhua

2013

- Gong Qihuang
- Hao Yue
- Lü Jian
- Tan Tieniu
- Wang Lijun
- Wang Wei (王巍)
- Yin Hao

2015

- Fang Jiancheng
- Gu Ying
- Huang Ru
- Jiang Jie
- Liu Ming
- Lu Jianhua
- Wang Yongliang
- Zhou Zhixin

2017

- Guan Xiaohong
- Mao Junfa
- Wang Jianyu
- Wu Zhaohui
- Yang Deren
- Andrew Yao (Yao Qizhi)
- Zheng Zhiming

2019

- Cui Tiejun
- Duan Guangren
- Feng Dengguo
- Jiang Fengyi
- Wang Huaimin
- Wang Jinlong
- Xiang Libin

== Division of Technological Sciences ==
1955

- Cai Fangyin
- Cheng Xiaogang
- Chu Yinghuang
- Hou Debang
- Huang Wenxi
- Jin Shuliang
- Lei Tianjue
- Li Guohao
- Li Qiang
- Li Wencai
- Li Xun
- Liang Sicheng
- Liu Dunzhen
- Liu Xianzhou
- Mao Yisheng
- Meng Zhaoying
- Qian Lingxi
- Shao Xianghua
- Shi Zhiren
- Sun Dehe
- Tao Hengxian
- Wang Huzhen
- Wang Zhixi
- Wu Xuelin
- Yan Kai
- Yang Tingbao
- Ye Zhupei
- Zhang Deqing
- Zhang Guangdou
- Zhang Mingtao
- Zhang Wei
- Zhao Feike
- Zhou Ren
- Zhou Zhihong
- Zhu Wuhua

1957

- Wang Juqian
- Wu Zhonghua

1980

- Bi Dexian
- Cai Changnian
- Cai Jintao
- Cai Qigong
- Cao Jianyou
- Chang Dong
- Chen Fangyun
- Chen Nengkuan
- Chen Xinmin
- Chen Xuejun
- Chen Zongji
- Ci Yungui
- Ding Shunnian
- Gao Jingde
- Gong Zutong
- Guo Kexin
- Hu Haichang
- Ke Jun
- Li Minhua
- Liang Shoupan
- Lin Lanying
- Liu Huixian
- Lü Baowei
- Mao Henian
- Meng Shaonong
- Pan Jiluan
- Pan Jiazheng
- Qian Ning
- Qian Zhonghan
- Ren Xinmin
- Shen Hong
- Shi Changxu
- Shi Shaoxi
- Wang Buxuan
- Wang Wenshao
- Wei Shoukun
- Wu Liangyong
- Wu Ziliang
- Xiao Jimei
- Xu Caidong
- Xu Shigao
- Xu Zhilun
- Yang You
- Zhang Enqiu
- Zhang Peilin
- Zhang Zhongjun
- Zhang Zuomei
- Zheng Zhemin
- Zhi Bingyi
- Zhou Huijiu
- Zhuang Yuzhi
- Zou Yuanxi

1991

- Cai Ruixian
- Cao Chunan
- Dai Nianci
- Dou Guoren
- Gao Weibing
- Gao Zhentong
- Gu Songfen
- Hu Yuxian
- Huang Kezhi
- Jiang Minhua
- Li Guangxuan
- Lin Bingnan
- Liu Guangjun
- Lu Qiang
- Lu Zhaojun
- Lu Yongxiang
- Miao Yongduan
- Min Guirong
- Ouyang Yu
- Qiu Dahong
- Shen Zhiyun
- Song Zhenqi
- Sun Jiadong
- Sun Jun
- Tang Jiuhua
- Tong Xianzhang
- Tu Shou'e
- Wang Dianzuo
- Wang Geng
- Wang Jingtang
- Wen Bangchun
- Wu Chengkang
- Yan Luguang
- Yan Minggao
- Yang Shuzi
- Yao Xi
- Ye Hengqiang
- Yu Hongru
- Zhang Xingqian
- Zhao Renkai
- Zhong Xiangchong
- Zhou Ganzhi
- Zhou Yaohe
- Zou Shichang

1993

- Cheng Qingguo
- Deng Ximing
- Li Yiyi
- Qi Kang
- Shi Qingyun
- Song Jiashu
- Wang Chongyu
- Wang Dazhong
- Wang Xiji
- Xu Xingchu
- Xu Xueyan
- Zhong Wanxie
- Zhou Xiaoxin

1995

- Cheng Gengdong
- Hu Wenrui
- Peng Yigang
- Shen Zhujiang
- Wang Liding
- Xiong Youlun
- Xu Jianzhong
- Xu Zuyao
- Zhou Guozhi
- Zhu Jing
- Zhu Senyuan

1997

- Cao Chunxiao
- Dang Hongxin
- Guo Zengyuan
- Li Jisheng
- Lin Gao
- Song Yuquan
- Wu Xiaoping
- Zhou Benlian
- Zhou Xiyuan

1999

- Gu Binglin
- Han Zhenxiang
- Jiang Zhonghong
- Liu Gaolian
- Tao Baoqi
- Wen Shizhu
- Yu Menglun
- Zhang Youqi

2001

- Chen Da
- Gao Yuchen
- Ge Changchun
- Liu Baoyong
- Liu Baixin
- Ma Zuguang
- Tang Shuxian
- Zhang Chuhan
- Zhang Ze
- Zheng Shiling
- Zhuang Fengchen

2003

- Chen Chuangtian
- Fan Shoushan
- Jin Zhanpeng
- Lu Ke
- Xing Qiuhen
- Yang Wei (杨卫)
- Ye Peijian
- Zhang Zixiong
- Zhou Yuan
- Zhu Weiqiu

2005

- Chen Zuyu
- Du Youwei
- Gu Yidong (顾逸东)
- Li Shutang
- Li Tian
- Tao Wenquan
- Wu Shuoxian
- Xue Qikun
- Zhao Chunsheng

2007

- Cheng Shijie
- Hu Haiyan
- Ren Luquan
- Wang Keming
- Zhu Shining

2009

- Liu Zhusheng
- Shen Changyu
- Wang Guangqian
- Wang Xi
- Wang Xifan
- Wang Ziqiang
- Yu Qifeng

2011

- Lai Yuanming
- Luo Jianbin
- Nan Cewen
- Shen Baogen
- Wei Bingbo
- Zhai Wanming
- Zhang Tongyi
- Zheng Ping
- Zhu Di

2013

- Cheng Huiming
- Ding Han
- Fang Daining
- Gao Deli
- He Manchao
- Jin Hongguang
- Li Yinghong
- Liu Weiming
- Qiu Yong

2015

- Chang Qing
- Chen Weijiang
- Chen Yunmin
- Han Jiecai
- He Yaling
- Ni Jinren
- Wang Weihua
- Xuan Yimin
- Yan Chuliang
- Yu Dapeng
- Zou Zhigang

2017

- Duan Wenhui
- Guo Liejin
- Guo Wanlin
- Liu Changsheng
- Ouyang Minggao
- Rui Xiaoting
- Teng Jinguang
- Tian Yongjun
- Wei Yueguang
- Yang Mengfei
- Yang Wei (杨伟)
- Zhang Qingjie

2019

- Duan Jin
- Jia Zhenyuan
- Li Dongxu
- Mao Ming
- Meng Daqiao
- Peng Lianmao
- Wang Qiuliang
- Wu Yican
- Ye Zhizhen
- Zhang Yue
- Zhao Tianshou
- Zhao Yangsheng
- Zheng Quanshui
- Zhu Meifang
- Zhu Xuejun
