= Wang Chi =

Wang Chi may refer to:

- Seongjong of Goryeo (961–997), personal name Wang Chi
- Wang Chi (swimmer), Taiwanese swimmer
- Wang Chi (scientist), director of the National Space Science Center, Chinese Academy of Sciences
- Chi Wang, co-chair of the U.S.-China Policy Foundation

== See also ==
- Wang Ji (disambiguation)
- Wang Qi (disambiguation)
