= Sun Xin =

Sun Xin may refer to:

- Sun Xin (Three Kingdoms), member of the Sun clan who ruled Eastern Wu (229–280)
- Sun Xin (Water Margin), a Chinese literary character
- Sun Xin (physicist), a member of the Chinese Academy of Sciences
- Sun Xin, member of the GNZ48 Chinese idol girl group
