= Wu Shishu =

Chinese theoretical physicist (1923–2009)

Wu Shishu (May 27, 1923 – February 27, 2009) was a Chinese theoretical physicist and professor at Jilin University. In 1980, he was elected a member of the Chinese Academy of Sciences.

Wu was one of the physicists who established the Department of Physics at Jilin University. He was the second dean of the department and succeeded Professor Yu Ruihuang.

== Early life and education ==
Wu was born in Beijing on May 27, 1923. He obtained a bachelor's degree in 1944 from Tongji University and a doctorate degree in 1951 from the University of Illinois.

== Death ==
Wu Shishu died on February 27, 2009, at the age of 85.
