= Zhu Yongguan =

Chinese geologist

- 朱永官
- Born: August 1967 (age 59); Tongxiang, Zhejiang, China
- Education: Zhejiang University; Imperial College London
- Scientific career
- Fields: Pedology
- Workplaces: Institute of Urban Environment, Chinese Academy of Sciences (CAS)

Zhu Yongguan (Chinese: 朱永官; pinyin: Zhū Yǒngguān; born August 1967) is a Chinese geologist and the current director of the Institute of Urban Environment, Chinese Academy of Sciences (CAS).

== Education ==
Zhu was born in Tongxiang, Zhejiang in August 1967. In 1989 he graduating from Zhejiang Agricultural University (now part of Zhejiang University). He received his Master of Science degree from the Institute of Soil Science, Chinese Academy of Sciences (CAS) in 1992 and doctor's degree in environmental biology from Imperial College London in 1998, respectively.

== Career ==
He returned to China in 2002 and that same year became a researcher at the Institute of Urban Environment, Chinese Academy of Sciences (CAS). He served as its deputy director in July 2007, and two years later promoted to the Director position.

== Honours and awards ==
- 2002 National Science Fund for Distinguished Young Scholars
- 2009 State Natural Science Award (Second Class)
- November 22, 2019 Member of the Chinese Academy of Sciences (CAS)
