= Wang Jinlong =

Chinese general

- 王金龙

President of PLA Ground Force Engineering University
- Incumbent
- Assumed office 2017
- Preceded by: New title

President of PLA University of Science and Technology
- In office 2015–2017
- Preceded by: Zhang Yafei
- Succeeded by: Position revoked

Personal details
- Born: March 1963 (age 63) Haixing County, Hebei, China
- Party: Chinese Communist Party
- Scientific career
- Fields: Shortwave communication
- Institutions: PLA Ground Force Engineering University

Chinese name
- Traditional Chinese: 王金龍
- Simplified Chinese: 王金龙
Transcriptions
Standard Mandarin
- Hanyu Pinyin: Wáng Jīnlóng

Wang Jinlong (Chinese: 王金龙; born March 1963) is a Chinese scientist and educator in the fields of shortwave communication. He has been President of the PLA Ground Force Engineering University since September 2015, and formerly served as Vice-President of PLA Information Engineering University. He holds the rank of major general (shao jiang) in the People's Liberation Army (PLA).

== Education ==
Wang was born in Haixing County, Hebei in March 1963. He received his doctor's degree from PLA Information Engineering University in 1992.

== Career ==
In January 2012 he was appointed Vice-President of PLA Information Engineering University. On September 25, 2015, he was promoted to become President of the PLA University of Science and Technology (now PLA Ground Force Engineering University), replacing Zhang Yafei.

In September 2017, he became a delegate to the 19th National Congress of the Chinese Communist Party.

== Honors and awards ==
- November 22, 2019 Member of the Chinese Academy of Sciences (CAS)

Educational offices
Preceded by Zhang Yafei (张亚非)	President of PLA University of Science and Technology; 2015–2017	Succeeded by Himself as President of PLA Ground Force Engineering University
Preceded by Himself as President of PLA University of Science and Technology	President of PLA Ground Force Engineering University; 2017	Incumbent
