= Zhang Qinglian =

Chinese chemist

Zhang Qinglian (Chinese: 张青莲; July 31, 1908 – December 14, 2006) was a Chinese chemist, who was a member of the Chinese Academy of Sciences.
