= Wang Lijun (scientist) =

Chinese physicist (born 1946)

Wang Lijun (Chinese: 王立军; born 13 July 1946) is a Chinese physicist who specializes in laser and optoelectronics. He is a research professor at the Changchun Institute of Optics, Fine Mechanics and Physics, and an academician of the Chinese Academy of Sciences.

== Biography ==
Wang was born 13 July 1946 in Shulan, Jilin, China. He graduated from the Department of Semiconductors of Jilin University in 1973, and became a faculty member at the university after graduation. He obtained his master's degree from Jilin University in 1982.

In May 1986, Wang became an assistant professor at the Changchun Institute of Physics, and later promoted to associate professor and then professor. In August 1999, the Changchun Institute of Physics merged with the Changchun Institute of Optics and Fine Mechanics to form the Changchun Institute of Optics, Fine Mechanics and Physics (CIOMP), and Wang became a research professor of CIOMP.

Wang spent two periods abroad as a visiting scholar: at Swiss Post Telephone & Telegraph from 1988 to 1989, and at Northwestern University in the United States from 1993 to 1995.

Wang's research focus is high-power diode lasers. In 2011, he created a 92-watt single-device vertical-cavity surface-emitting laser (VCSEL), which set a new world record. As of late 2013, he had published 264 SCI or EI research papers and four books, and had 94 patents. He was elected an academician of the Chinese Academy of Sciences in 2013.
