= Zheng Quanshui =

Chinese scientist

- 郑泉水
- Born: March 1961 (age 65); Jinxi County, Jiangxi, China
- Education: Nanchang University; Peking University; Hunan University; Tsinghua University
- Scientific career
- Fields: Solid mechanics
- Workplaces: Tsinghua University
- Doctoral advisor: Huang Kezhi

Chinese name
- Traditional Chinese: 鄭泉水
- Simplified Chinese: 郑泉水
Transcriptions
Standard Mandarin
- Hanyu Pinyin: Zhèng Quánshuǐ

Zheng Quanshui (Chinese: 郑泉水; born March 1961) is a Chinese scientist currently serving as a professor and doctoral supervisor at Tsinghua University.

== Education ==
Zheng was born in the town of Huwan, Jinxi County, Jiangxi in March 1961. He holds a number of degrees starting with bachelor's degree in Industrial and civil buildings from Jiangxi Institute of Technology (now Nanchang University, 1982), then a master's degree in applied mathematics from Beijing University (1985), a master's degree in solid mechanics from Hunan University (1985), and a doctor's degree from Tsinghua University (1989).

== Career ==
From 1982 to 1993 he taught at Jiangxi Institute of Technology, becoming associate professor in 1987 and to full professor in 1992. From 1990 to 1993, he was a researcher at the Royal Society and Alexander von Humboldt Foundation. In May 1993 he joined the faculty of Institute of Aeronautics and Astronautics, Tsinghua University, where he became a doctoral supervisor in 1994 and a director of the Department of Engineering Mechanics in 2004,

== Honours and awards ==
- 1995 National Science Fund for Distinguished Young Scholars
- 2000 "Chang Jiang Scholar" (or " Yangtze River Scholar")
- 2004 State Natural Science Award (Second Class)
- 2017 State Natural Science Award (Second Class)
- November 22, 2019 Member of the Chinese Academy of Sciences (CAS)
