= Qian Qian =

Chinese biologist (born 1962)

- 钱前
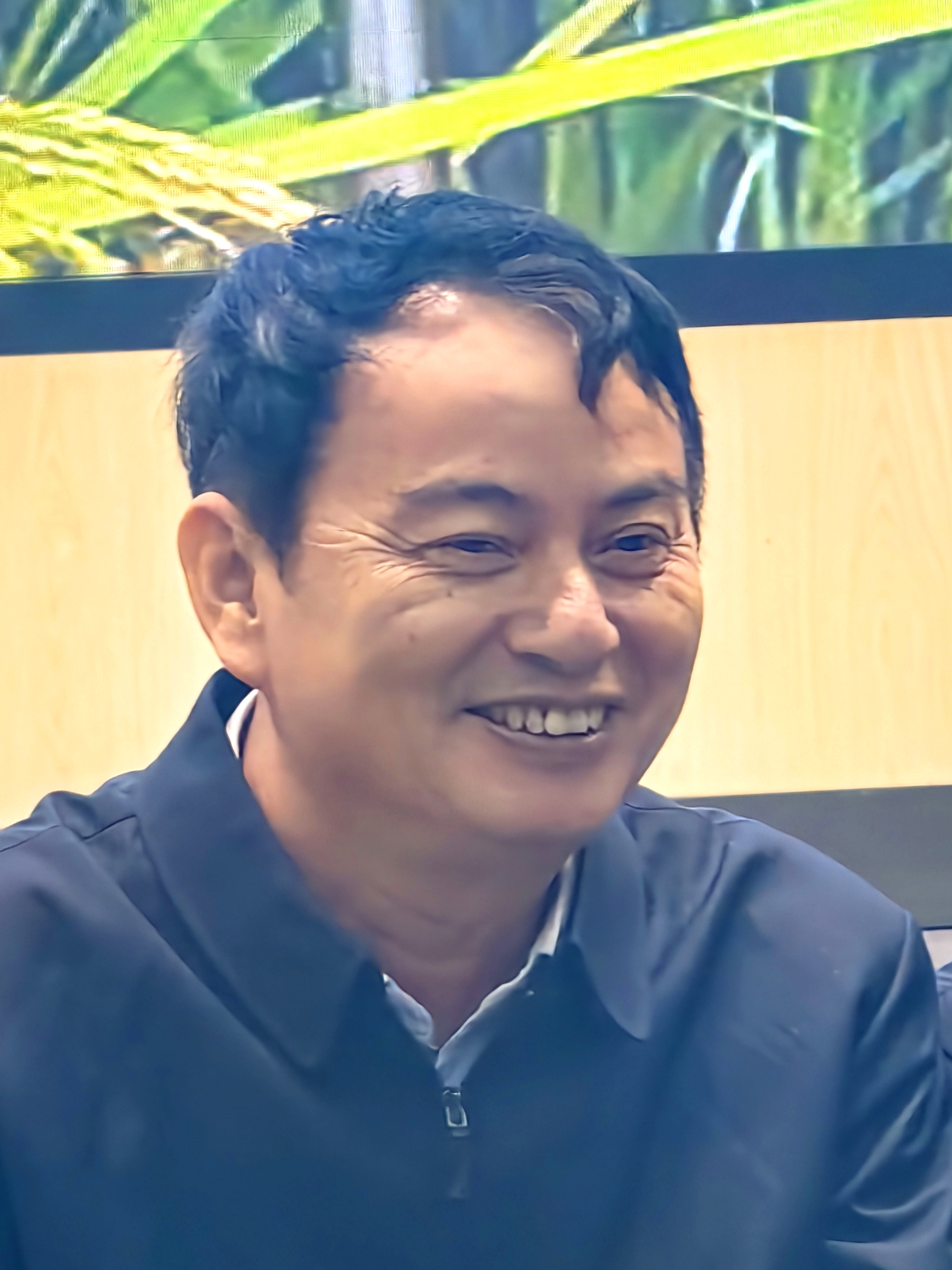
- Qian Qian (2026)
- Born: March 1962 (age 64); Anqing, Anhui, China
- Education: Nankai University; Hokkaido University; Chinese Academy of Agriculture Sciences
- Scientific career
- Fields: Rice
- Workplaces: China National Rice Research Institute

Chinese name
- Traditional Chinese: 錢前
- Simplified Chinese: 钱前
Transcriptions
Standard Mandarin
- Hanyu Pinyin: Qián Qián

Qian Qian (Chinese: 钱前; born March 1962) is a Chinese biologist currently serving as researcher and vice-president of the China National Rice Research Institute. He is also president of the State Key Laboratory of Rice Biology.

== Education ==
Qian was born in Anqing, Anhui in March 1962. He attended the Anqing No. 2 High School. In 1983, he graduated from Nankai University. He received his master's degree from Hokkaido University in 1989, and doctor's degree from Chinese Academy of Agriculture Sciences in 1995.

== Career ==
In July 1983, he joined the China National Rice Research Institute, becoming a researcher in 2001 and vice-president in 2013.

In May 1996, he joined the Jiusan Society. From 2002 to 200,3 he was a visiting scholar at Okayama University. In 2017, he was elected a member of the Standing Committee of the 14th Central Committee of Jiusan Society.

== Honours and awards ==
- 2017 State Natural Science Award (First Class)
- November 22, 2019 Member of the Chinese Academy of Sciences (CAS)
