= Jia Zhenyuan =

Chinese mechanical engineer and academic

- 贾振元
- Born: July 1963 (age 63); Liaoning, China
- Education: Dalian University of Technology
- Scientific career
- Fields: Machine manufacturing
- Workplaces: Dalian University of Technology

Chinese name
- Traditional Chinese: 賈振元
- Simplified Chinese: 贾振元
Transcriptions
Standard Mandarin
- Hanyu Pinyin: Jiǎ Zhènyuán

Jia Zhenyuan (Chinese: 贾振元; born July 1963) is a Chinese mechanical engineering expert and professor at Dalian University of Technology. He has been Executive Vice President of Dalian University of Technology since 2019.

== Education ==
Jia was born in Liaoning province in July 1963. He earned his bachelor's degree in 1984, master's degree in 1987, and doctor's degree in 1990, all from Dalian University of Technology.

== Career ==
After graduation, he taught there, where he was promoted to associate professor in October 1992 and to full professor in August 1996. In September 1999 he became deputy dean of its School of Mechanical Engineering, rising to dean in May 2003. He was a visiting professor at the University of Michigan between February 2002 and February 2003. In March 2015 he was promoted again to become vice-president of Dalian University of Technology.

== Contributions ==
He made contribution to the processing of high performance carbon fiber composite components, which led him won the First Class of State Technological Invention Award in 2017.

== Honours and awards ==
- 2009 "Chang Jiang Scholar" (or " Yangtze River Scholar")
- 2017 State Technological Invention Award (First Class)
- November 22, 2019 Member of the Chinese Academy of Sciences (CAS)
