= Wang Dingsheng =

Chinese researcher

Dingsheng Wang (Chinese: 王鼎盛; pinyin: Wang Dingsheng, born 1940) is a Chinese physicist, nanocatalyst, and professor at the Tsinghua University. He is a fellow of the Chinese Academy of Sciences.

His research publication on design concept for electrocatalysts won the 2022 Nano Research Top Papers Award.

== Education and career ==
Dingsheng obtained a degree in physics from Beijing University in 1962. Between 1966 and 1982, he was a research assistant at the Institute of Physics, Chinese Academy of Sciences. He became a full professor in 1986.
