= Ge Molin =

Chinese physicist

Ge Molin (born December 5, 1938) is a Chinese theoretical physicist and professor at Nankai University. He is a fellow of the Chinese Academy of Sciences.

== Education and career ==
Molin attended Beijing No. 5 High School for his primary education between 1950 and 1956. He obtained a degree from Lanzhou University. He joined Lanzhou University as a faculty member in 1965 and became a professor of physics before he left in 1986 to join Nankai University.
