= Cai Ronggen =

Chinese physicist

- 蔡荣根
- Born: September 1964 (age 62); Hangzhou, Zhejiang, China
- Education: Hangzhou Normal University; Sichuan University; Fudan University
- Scientific career
- Fields: Physics
- Workplaces: Chinese Academy of Sciences (CAS) Ningbo University

Chinese name
- Traditional Chinese: 蔡榮根
- Simplified Chinese: 蔡荣根
Transcriptions
Standard Mandarin
- Hanyu Pinyin: Cài Rónggēn

Cai Ronggen (Chinese: 蔡荣根; born September 1964) is a theoretical physicist and an academician of the Chinese Academy of Sciences as well as the World Academy of Sciences for the Advancement of Science in Developing Countries. He is currently the President of Ningbo University and previously served as the Director and Party Secretary of the Institute of Theoretical Physics at the Chinese Academy of Sciences.

== Biography ==
Cai was born in Hangzhou, Zhejiang in September 1964. After the resumption of the college entrance examination, he was accepted to Hangzhou Normal University, where he majored in physics. He earned his master's degree from Sichuan University in 1987 and his doctorate from Fudan University in 1995.

In July 1995, he joined the Institute of Theoretical Physics at the Chinese Academy of Sciences (CAS) as a researcher. Cai's research has included cosmology and theories of dark energy, including work related to holographic dark energy, a framework connecting dark-energy models with the holographic principle. Two years later, he became a researcher at the Center for Theoretical Physics at Seoul National University. In September 1999, he moved to the Department of Physics at Osaka University as a researcher.

In 2017, Cai was elected an academician at CAS. In January 2018, he became a member of the 13th National Committee of the Chinese People's Political Consultative Conference.

== Award ==
- 2011 Second Prize of National Natural Science Award
