= Lu Xiyun =

Chinese physicist (born 1963)

- 陆夕云
- Born: April 1963 (age 63); Taizhou, Jiangsu, China
- Education: University of Science and Technology of China
- Scientific career
- Fields: Hydrodynamics
- Workplaces: University of Science and Technology of China
- Academic advisors: Tong Binggang

Chinese name
- Traditional Chinese: 陸夕雲
- Simplified Chinese: 陆夕云
Transcriptions
Standard Mandarin
- Hanyu Pinyin: Lù Xīyún

Lu Xiyun (Chinese: 陆夕云; born April 1963) is a Chinese physicist currently serving as director of the School of Engineering Science, University of Science and Technology of China.

== Biography ==
Lu was born in Taizhou, Jiangsu in April 1963. He completed his doctor's degree from the University of Science and Technology of China in 1992.

He was a visiting scholar at Pennsylvania State University, University of Houston, University of Tennessee, University of Tokyo, Northeastern University, Hong Kong University of Science and Technology and National University of Singapore since 1992.

He is now the director of the School of Engineering Science, University of Science and Technology of China.

== Honours and awards ==
- "Chang Jiang Scholar" (or "Yangtze River Scholar")
- November 22, 2019 Academician of the Chinese Academy of Sciences (CAS)
