= Mao Junfa =

Chinese engineer and academic (born 1965)

Mao Junfa (Chinese: 毛军发; born August 1965) is a Chinese engineer and academic. He is a professor of engineering at Shanghai Jiao Tong University (SJTU).

Mao received his BS from the National University of Defense Technology in 1985, and went on to the Chinese Academy of Sciences' Shanghai Institute of Nuclear Research for his MS (1988) and SJTU for his PhD (1992). He undertook postdoctoral work at the Chinese University of Hong Kong and the University of California, Berkeley before returning to SJTU to join the faculty. He was named Fellow of the Institute of Electrical and Electronics Engineers (IEEE) in 2012 "for contributions to interconnects and passive components in integrated circuits and systems".
