= Shi Jianlin =

Chinese chemist

- 施剑林
- Born: 1964 (age 61–62); Taicang, Jiangsu, China
- Education: Nanjing Tech University
- Scientific career
- Fields: Inorganic chemistry
- Workplaces: Shanghai Institute of Ceramics, Chinese Academy of Sciences (CAS)
- Doctoral advisor: Yan Dongsheng

Chinese name
- Traditional Chinese: 施劍林
- Simplified Chinese: 施剑林
Transcriptions
Standard Mandarin
- Hanyu Pinyin: Shī Jiànlín

Shi Jianlin (Chinese: 施剑林) is a Chinese chemist specializing in inorganic chemistry.

== Early life and education ==
Shi was born in Taicang, Jiangsu in 1964. In 1983 he graduated from Nanjing Tech University. In 1989 he received his doctor's degree from the Shanghai Institute of Ceramics, Chinese Academy of Sciences (CAS) under the supervision of Yan Dongsheng.

== Career ==
He is now a researcher and doctoral supervisor at the Shanghai Institute of Ceramics, Chinese Academy of Sciences (CAS).

== Honours and awards ==
- 2008 "Chang Jiang Scholar" (or "Yangtze River Scholar")
- 2011 State Natural Science Award (Second Class)
- 2016 Fellow of the Royal Society of Chemistry
- November 22, 2019 Academician of the Chinese Academy of Sciences (CAS)
