= Wang Yanxin =

Chinese scientist

- 王焰新

President of China University of Geosciences (Wuhan)
- Incumbent
- Assumed office December 2010
- Preceded by: Zhang Jingao

Personal details
- Born: November 1963 (age 62) Yuanping, Shanxi, China
- Party: Chinese Communist Party
- Education: Nanjing University; China University of Geosciences (Wuhan)
- Scientific career
- Fields: Hydrogeochemistry
- Workplaces: China University of Geosciences (Wuhan)

Wang Yanxin (Chinese: 王焰新; pinyin: Wáng Yànxīn; born November 1963) is a Chinese scientist and the current president of China University of Geosciences (Wuhan).

== Education ==
Wang was born in Yuanping, Shanxi in November 1963. He secondary studied at Xiaochang No. 1 High School. After the resumption of college entrance examination, he entered Nanjing University, where he graduated in 1984. He received his master of engineering degree in hydrogeology and doctor of engineering degree in hydrogeology from China University of Geosciences (Wuhan) in 1987 and 1990, respectively.

== Career ==
After graduation, he taught there. He was promoted to associate professor in 1992 and to full professor in 1994. From 1998 to 1999 he was a senior visiting scholar at the University of Waterloo. He served as vice-president of China University of Geosciences (Wuhan) in January 2000, and ten years later promoted to the President position.

== Honors and awards ==
- 2004 National Science Fund for Distinguished Young Scholars
- September 24, 2019 Applied Hydrogeology Award
- November 22, 2019 Member of the Chinese Academy of Sciences (CAS)
- December 2019 John Hem Award for Excellence in Science and Engineering

Educational offices
Preceded by Zhang Jingao (张锦高)	President of China University of Geosciences (Wuhan); 2010	Incumbent
