= Hu Renyu =

Chinese nuclear physicist

- 胡仁宇
- Born: July 20, 1931 (age 95); Shanghai, China
- Education: Tsinghua University; Soviet Academy of Sciences
- Scientific career
- Fields: Nuclear physics
- Workplaces: China Academy of Engineering Physics
- Academic advisors: Pavel Cherenkov

Hu Renyu (Chinese: 胡仁宇; pinyin: Hú Rényǔ; born 20 July 1931) is a Chinese nuclear physicist who is a researcher and former president at the China Academy of Engineering Physics.

== Biography ==
Hu was born in Shanghai, Republic of China, on July 20, 1931, while his ancestral home in Shangrao, Jiangxi. He secondary studied at Zhejiang Hangzhou High School. After graduating from Tsinghua University in August 1952, he was assigned to the Institute of Modern Physics, Chinese Academy of Sciences. In September 1956, he studied at the Soviet Academy of Sciences under the direction of Pavel Cherenkov. He returned to China in 1958 and that same year joined the No.9 Institute of the Ministry of Second Machinery Industry. In June 1959, he began to take part in the development of nuclear weapons. In June 1983, he was promoted to vice-president of the No.9 Research Institute of the Ministry of Nuclear Industry, assisting Deng Jiaxian to organize and lead the scientific research work of the institute. In September 1985, he was named acting president. He was installed as president in 1986, serving in the post until he retirement in January 1994.

He was a member of the 8th and 9th National Committee of the Chinese People's Political Consultative Conference.

== Honours and awards ==
- 1982 State Natural Science Award (First Class)
- 1986 State Science and Technology Progress Award (Special)
- 1989 State Science and Technology Progress Award (Special)
- 1991 Member of the Chinese Academy of Sciences (CAS)
- 1995 Science and Technology Progress Award of the Ho Leung Ho Lee Foundation
