= Yang Wantai =

Chinese chemist

- 杨万泰
- Born: October 1956 (age 69); Cheng'an County, Hebei, China
- Education: Tsinghua University; Beijing University of Chemical Technology; KTH Royal Institute of Technology
- Scientific career
- Fields: Polymer chemistry
- Workplaces: Beijing University of Chemical Technology

Yang Wantai (simplified Chinese: 杨万泰; traditional Chinese: 楊萬泰; pinyin: Yáng Wàntài; born October 1956) is a Chinese chemist and professor at Beijing University of Chemical Technology.

== Biography ==
Yang was born in Cheng'an County, Hebei, in October 1956. After resuming the college entrance examination, he was accepted to Tsinghua University, where he majored in chemistry. He earned a master's degree from Beijing University of Chemical Technology, after his graduation he worked in the university. In April 1996 he received his doctor's degree from the KTH Royal Institute of Technology.

He was dean of the School of Materials, Beijing University of Chemical Technology from 2005 to 2016. In 2013 he was appointed director of Beijing Laboratory of Biomedical Materials. He was elected an academician of the Chinese Academy of Sciences on November 28, 2017.

== Papers ==
- Deng, Jian-Ping; Yang, Wan-Tai; Rånby, Bengt (2001). "Auto-Initiating Performance of Styrene on Surface Photografting Polymerization". Macromolecular Rapid Communications. 22 (7): 535–538. doi:10.1002/1521-3927(20010401)22:7<535::AID-MARC535>3.0.CO;2-3.
- Xing, Chang-Min; Yang, Wan-Tai (2004). "A Novel, Facile Method for the Preparation of Uniform, Reactive Maleic Anhydride/Vinyl Acetate Copolymer Micro- and Nanospheres". Macromolecular Rapid Communications. 25 (17): 1568–1574. doi:10.1002/marc.200400230.
- Yang, Peng; Meng, Xiangfei; Zhang, Zhiyuan; Jing, Benxin; Yuan, Jing; Yang, Wantai (2005). "Thickness Measurement of Nanoscale Polymer Layer on Polymer Substrates by Attenuated Total Reflection Infrared Spectroscopy". Analytical Chemistry. 77 (4): 1068–1074. doi:10.1021/ac048869d. PMID 15858987.
- Wang, Yongxin; Yang, Wantai (2004). "MMA/DVB Emulsion Surface Graft Polymerization Initiated by UV Light". Langmuir. 20 (15): 6225–6231. doi:10.1021/la0493924. PMID 15248706.
- Wang, Yongxin; Zhong, Wenbin; Jiang, Nan; Yang, Wantai (2005). "Directly Fabricating Monolayer Nanoparticles on a Polymer Surface by UV-Induced MMA/DVB Microemulsion Graft Polymerization". Macromolecular Rapid Communications. 26 (2): 87–92. doi:10.1002/marc.200400488.
