= Guo Aike =

- 郭爱克
- Born: 18 February 1940; Fengtian, Fengtian Province, Manchukuo
- Died: 10 April 2025 (aged 85); Hangzhou, Zhejiang, China
- Education: Moscow State University; LMU Munich
- Scientific career
- Fields: Neuroscience
- Workplaces: Chinese Academy of Sciences
- Doctoral advisor: Ulrich Smola

Chinese name
- Simplified Chinese: 郭爱克
- Traditional Chinese: 郭愛克
Transcriptions
Standard Mandarin
- Hanyu Pinyin: Guō Àikè

Guo Aike (Chinese: 郭爱克; 18 February 1940 – 10 April 2025) was a Chinese neuroscientist, and an academician of the Chinese Academy of Sciences.

== Biography ==
Guo was born in Fengtian, Fengtian Province (now Shenyang, Liaoning), during the Manchukuo reign, on 18 February 1940. In 1960, he was sent to study at Moscow State University on government scholarships.

After university in 1965, Cultural Revolution subsequently broke out, Guo was sent to the May Seventh Cadre Schools to do farm works in Qianjiang, Hubei. In 1976, he was selected to study German in Class 76 of Beijing Language Institute (now Beijing Language and Culture University). With the support of the scholarship from the German Academic Exchange Service, he chose to study at LMU Munich. In September 1979, he obtained a PhD in Natural Sciences from LMU Munich with outstanding grades, becoming the first scholar from the People's Republic of China to study for a PhD in Germany. He worked as a visiting scholar at the Max Planck Institute for Biological Cybernetics in Germany from November 1982 to June 1984, conducting research on the biological control theory of pattern and background resolution in the visual system of houseflies. In 1993, he founded China's first learning and memory laboratory with drosophila as a model organism in the Institute of Biophysics, Chinese Academy of Sciences. At the end of the same year, he went to Germany for the third time and conducted academic research at the University of Würzburg and the Institute of Biological Control Theory of the Max Planck Society. From 2003 to 2008, he served as deputy director of the Institute of Neuroscience, Chinese Academy of Sciences.

On 10 April 2025, Guo died in Hangzhou, Zhejiang, at the age of 85.

== Honours and awards ==
- 2003 Member of the Chinese Academy of Sciences (CAS)
