= Weijian Zhou =

Chinese geochemist

- Education: North-west University
- Scientific career
- Workplaces: Chinese Academy of Sciences; Xi'an Jiaotong University

Weijian Zhou is a geologist at the Chinese Academy of Sciences known for her research into environmental changes in the Quaternary era using radiocarbon data.

== Education and career ==
Zhou graduated from Guizhou University in 1976. She earned her Ph.D. in 1995 from North-West University in China in 1995, and her Ph.D. won the “First National Prize for the One Hundred Most Outstanding PhD Theses in China”. In 1999, she became a professor in the Institute of Earth Environment at the Chinese Academy of Sciences in Xi'an, China. In 2006 she began her position as the director of the Xi'an Accelerator Mass Spectrometry Center.

In 2016, she was named a fellow of the American Geophysical Union who cited her "for exceptional contributions to radiocarbon dating and our understanding of East Asian and global environmental changes using radionuclides as tracers".

== Research ==
Weijian Zhou is known for using Accelerator mass spectrometry data to track geochemical tracers such as beryllium-10 in loess and Carbon-14. Through these data streams, Zhou studies to chronostratigraphy in the Quaternary era, the period from 2.9 million years ago to the present. Her research has provided insights into the monsoons in China, and records of ancient rainfall through tracking of beryllium-10 in dust layers. During the COVID-19 pandemic, Zhou's research showed carbon dioxide concentrations were lower than previous years, but this decrease was short-lived because values returned to pre-pandemic levels when lockdown restrictions were lifted.

=== Selected publications ===
- Zhou, Weijian; Donahue, Douglas J.; Porter, Stephen C.; Jull, Timothy A.; Xiaoqiang, Li; Stuiver, Minze; Zhisheng, An; Matsumoto, Eiji; Guangrong, Dong (November 1996). "Variability of Monsoon Climate in East Asia at the End of the Last Glaciation". Quaternary Research. 46 (3): 219–229. Bibcode:1996QuRes..46..219W. doi:10.1006/qres.1996.0062. S2CID 129650707.
- Zhou, Weijian; Donahue, Douglas; Jull, A. J. T. (1997). "Radiocarbon AMS Dating of Pollen Concentrated from Eolian Sediments: Implications for Monsoon Climate Change Since the Late Quaternary". Radiocarbon. 39 (1): 19–26. Bibcode:1997Radcb..39...19Z. doi:10.1017/S0033822200040868.
- Zheng, Yanhong; Zhou, Weijian; Meyers, Philip A.; Xie, Shucheng (November 2007). "Lipid biomarkers in the Zoigê-Hongyuan peat deposit: Indicators of Holocene climate changes in West China". Organic Geochemistry. 38 (11): 1927–1940. Bibcode:2007OrGeo..38.1927Z. doi:10.1016/j.orggeochem.2007.06.012.
- Zhou, Weijian; Zheng, Yanhong; Meyers, Philip A.; Jull, A.J. Timothy; Xie, Shucheng (May 2010). "Postglacial climate-change record in biomarker lipid compositions of the Hani peat sequence, Northeastern China". Earth and Planetary Science Letters. 294 (1–2): 37–46. Bibcode:2010E&PSL.294...37Z. doi:10.1016/j.epsl.2010.02.035.
- An, Zhisheng; Huang, Ru-Jin; Zhang, Renyi; Tie, Xuexi; Li, Guohui; Cao, Junji; Zhou, Weijian; Shi, Zhengguo; Han, Yongming; Gu, Zhaolin; Ji, Yuemeng (30 April 2019). "Severe haze in northern China: A synergy of anthropogenic emissions and atmospheric processes". Proceedings of the National Academy of Sciences. 116 (18): 8657–8666. Bibcode:2019PNAS..116.8657A. doi:10.1073/pnas.1900125116. PMC 6500134. PMID 30988177.

== Awards and honors ==
- Academician, Division of Earth Sciences, Chinese Academy of Sciences (2009)
- Elected member, Academy of Sciences for the Developing World (2010)
- Fellow, American Geophysical Union (2016)
