= Zhu Xianmo =

- 朱显谟
- Born: December 4, 1915; Chongming, Shanghai, China
- Died: October 11, 2017 (aged 101); Xi'an, Shaanxi, China
- Education: Shanghai High School; National Central University
- Scientific career
- Fields: Agrology
- Workplaces: Northwest Agriculture and Forestry University; Institute of Water and Soil Conservation, Chinese Academy of Sciences and Ministry of Water Conservancy

Zhu Xianmo (simplified Chinese: 朱显谟; traditional Chinese: 朱顯謨; pinyin: Zhū Xiǎnmó; Wade–Giles: Chu Hsien-mo; December 4, 1915 – October 11, 2017) was a Chinese agronomist. Zhu was a member of the Chinese Communist Party. He was elected an academician of the Chinese Academy of Sciences in 1998. He was a member of the 5th and 6th Shaanxi Provincial CPC Committee.

== Biography ==
Zhu was born December 4, 1915, in Chongming, Shanghai. After high school, he entered National Central University. After the Second Sino-Japanese War broke out in 1937, the university evacuated to Chongqing, he received financial aid from Fan Cunzhong, a professor at National Central University. In 1940 he was assigned to Jiangxi Geological Survey and then was transferred to Central Geological Survey. At this time, he went to Jiangxi to do a soil survey with his teacher Hou Guangjiong. After the establishment of the Communist State, he worked at the Chinese Academy of Sciences in Beijing. In 1959, under the policy call to support the Great Northwest, he worked at the Institute of Water and Soil Conservation, Chinese Academy of Sciences and Ministry of Water Conservancy. In 1991 he was elected an academician of the Chinese Academy of Sciences. On October 11, 2017, he died of illness in Xi'an, Shaanxi.
