= Zhu Di (scientist) =

Chinese mechanical engineer

Zhu Di CAS

President of Nanjing University of Aeronautics and Astronautics
- In office September 2009 – June 2013
- Succeeded by: Nie Hong

Personal details
- Born: May 1954 (age 72) Shenyang, Liaoning, China
- Education: Nanjing University of Aeronautics and Astronautics (DEng)

Zhu Di (Chinese: 朱荻; born May 1954) is a Chinese mechanical engineer, and a member of the Chinese Academy of Sciences since 2011. He is a professor at the Nanjing University of Aeronautics and Astronautics (NUAA), and served as the President of NUAA from September 2009 until June 2013, when he was replaced by Nie Hong (聂宏).

== Biography ==
Zhu Di was born May 1954 in Shenyang, Liaoning province. In 1985, he graduated from the department of mechanical engineering of NUAA with a Doctor of Engineering degree. From 1991 to 1992, he was a researcher at the University of Liverpool, England. From 1995 to 1999, he was a researcher at the University of Nebraska–Lincoln, United States. He has published about 200 research papers and holds 29 patents.
