= Chen Mufa =

Chinese mathematician

Chen Mufa is a Chinese professor of mathematics at Beijing Normal University. He is a member of the Chinese Academy of Sciences and the World Academy of Sciences. In addition to his work on probability theory, as a mathematician, Chen contributed to mathematical physics.

Chen is a faculty member at Beijing Normal University and a member of the advisory committee for the Beijing International Center for Mathematics.

He is Jiangsu Province's first academician of mathematical science.

== Education and career ==
Chen obtained a doctorate degree in 1983 from Beijing Normal University. He joined Beijing Normal University in 1980 and became a full professor in 1985. In 2003, he was elected a member of the Chinese Academy of Sciences, and in 2009, he was elected a member of the World Academy of Sciences. He is a fellow of the American Mathematical Society.
