= Chen Biao (astronomer) =

Chinese astronomer

Chen Biao (Chinese: 陈彪; born November 23, 1923) was a Chinese astronomer who specialized in solar physics. He is a member of the Chinese Academy of Sciences.
