= Kuang Yuping =

Chinese physicist

Kuang Yuping is a Chinese physicist and professor at Tsinghua University. He was awarded the 1989 Wu Youxun Prize in Physics.

In 2003, he was elected a fellow of the Chinese Academy of Sciences.

== Education and career ==
Kuang obtained a degree in physics from Peking University in 1955. He was a faculty member at Lanzhou University, where he rose to the rank of associate professor (1955–1979).

He joined Peking University in 1982 and was head of the Theory Group in the Department of Engineering Physics.
