= Xu Hongxing =

Chinese physicist (born 1969)

- 徐红星
- Born: May 1969 (age 57); Lianyungang, Jiangsu, China
- Education: Peking University; Chalmers University of Technology
- Scientific career
- Fields: Photonics
- Workplaces: Institute of Physics, Chinese Academy of Sciences (CAS)

Chinese name
- Traditional Chinese: 徐紅星
- Simplified Chinese: 徐红星
Transcriptions
Standard Mandarin
- Hanyu Pinyin: Xú Hóngxīng

Xu Hongxing (Chinese: 徐红星; born May 1969) is a Chinese physicist and vice president of the Institute for Advanced Studies of Wuhan University. He is also a professor at the School of Physics and Technology, Wuhan University.

== Biography ==
Xu was born in Lianyungang, Jiangsu province in 1969. After graduating from Banpu High School in 1988, he was accepted to Peking University. In 1996, he pursued advanced studies in Sweden, earning his master's degree and doctor's degree from Chalmers University of Technology in 1998 and 2002, respectively.

In August 2002, he was promoted to associate professor at Lund University. He returned to China in January 2005 and that year became a researcher at the Institute of Physics, Chinese Academy of Sciences (CAS). He was deputy director of the State Key Laboratory for Surface Physics from 2007 to 2008 and director of Nanoscale Physics & Devices Laboratory from 2009 to 2014. He joined the Chinese Communist Party in May 2011. In September 2012, he joined Wuhan University as professor and director of Center for Nanoscience and Technology. He was appointed as a "Chang Jiang Scholar" (or " Yangtze River Scholar") by the Ministry of Education of the People's Republic of China in 2014.

== Honors ==
In November 2017 he was elected an academician of the Chinese Academy of Sciences (CAS).

In 2018 he became a member of the Chinese Optical Society. That same year, he was elected a fellow of The World Academy of Sciences.
