= Zhao Yangsheng =

Chinese researcher

- 赵阳升
- Born: December 1955 (age 70); Taiyuan, Shanxi, China
- Education: Taiyuan University of Technology; Liaoning Technical University; Tongji University
- Scientific career
- Fields: Mineral engineering
- Workplaces: Taiyuan University of Technology

Chinese name
- Traditional Chinese: 趙陽升
- Simplified Chinese: 赵阳升
Transcriptions
Standard Mandarin
- Hanyu Pinyin: Zhào Yángshēng

Zhao Yangsheng (Chinese: 赵阳升; born December 1955) is a Chinese scientist currently serving as a professor and doctoral supervisor at Taiyuan University of Technology. He is a member of the International Society for Rock Mechanics (ISRM) and Chinese Society for Rock Mechanics and Engineering (CSRME).

== Education ==
Zhao was born in Taiyuan, Shanxi in December 1955. After the resumption of college entrance examination, he attended Shanxi Mining Institute (now Taiyuan University of Technology) where he received his bachelor's degree in 1982. After completing his master's degree at Fuxin Mining Institute (now Liaoning Technical University), he attended Tongji University where he obtained his doctor's degree in 1992.

== Career ==
In 2018 he founded the National Research and Development Center for Oil Shale Exploitation with Sinopec.

== Honours and awards ==
- 1996 National Science Fund for Distinguished Young Scholars
- 1999 "Chang Jiang Scholar" (or " Yangtze River Scholar")
- 2005 State Technological Invention Award (Second Class)
- 2006 National Labor Medal
- November 22, 2019 Member of the Chinese Academy of Sciences (CAS)
