= Liang Shuquan =

Chinese chemist (1912–2006)

Liang Shuquan (Chinese: 梁树权; September 17, 1912 – December 9, 2006) was a Chinese chemist. He was a member of the Chinese Academy of Sciences.
