= Wang Dacheng =

Chinese molecular biophysicist

- 王大成
- Born: 11 June 1940; Chengdu, Sichuan, China
- Died: 19 September 2025 (aged 85); Beijing, China
- Education: University of Science and Technology of China
- Scientific career
- Fields: Molecular biophysics
- Workplaces: Institute of Biophysics, Chinese Academy of Sciences (CAS)

Wang Dacheng (Chinese: 王大成; pinyin: Wáng Dàchéng; 11 June 1940 – 19 September 2025) was a Chinese molecular biophysicist, and an academician of the Chinese Academy of Sciences. He was renowned as one of the pioneers of protein crystallography and structural biology in China. He was vice chairman of the Chinese Biophysical Society and vice chairman of the Chinese Crystallographic Society.

== Early life and education ==
Wang was born on 11 June 1940 in Chengdu, Sichuan, and graduated from the University of Science and Technology of China (USTC) in 1963 with a degree in biophysics.

== Career ==
After university, Wang began his career at the Institute of Biophysics, Chinese Academy of Sciences (CAS) in 1963, where he served as deputy director of the Institute and director of the Molecular Biology Research Center. He was also a visiting scholar at the Max Planck Institute for Biochemistry in Germany as an Alexander von Humboldt Research Fellow (1982–1984). In 1988, he went to the Protein Crystallography Laboratory of the Department of Chemistry at the University of York in the United Kingdom to study and work as a Wellcome Research Fellow.

== Death ==
On 19 September 2025, Wang died in Beijing, at the age of 85.

== Honours and awards ==
- 2005 Member of the Chinese Academy of Sciences (CAS)
