= Sun Daye =

Chinese scientist

- 孙大业
- Born: 25 July 1937; Hangzhou, Zhejiang, China
- Died: 7 July 2025 (aged 87); Shijiazhuang, Hebei, China
- Education: China Agricultural University
- Scientific career
- Fields: Cytology
- Workplaces: Hebei Normal University

Chinese name
- Simplified Chinese: 孙大业
- Traditional Chinese: 孫大業
Transcriptions
Standard Mandarin
- Hanyu Pinyin: Sūn Dàyè

Sun Daye (Chinese: 孙大业; 25 July 1937 – 7 July 2025) was a Chinese cytologist who was a professor at Hebei Normal University, and an academician of the Chinese Academy of Sciences. He was a delegate to the 10th National People's Congress.

== Biography ==
Sun was born in Hangzhou, Zhejiang, on 25 July 1937, while his ancestral home is in Longwan District of Wenzhou. He had three siblings. His father Sun Ming graduated from Shanghai Law and Politics College and Zhijiang University Business School. Due to being born during the Second Sino-Japanese War, his family moved to Guiyang, capital of southwest China's Guizhou province to escape the war. After war, he attended Yichun Primary School in Jiangxi province in 1946. In the autumn of 1948, Sun returned to Wenzhou, where he enrolled at Yongchang Primary School and Wenzhou No.2 High School. In 1955, he was accepted to Beijing Agricultural University (now China Agricultural University), majoring in agriculture.

After university in 1959, Sun was assigned to Shijiazhuang Normal University (now Hebei Normal University), where he successively worked as a teaching assistant, lecturer (until 1983), associate professor (promoted in 1984), and professor (promoted in 1989). In 1981, he was sent to the United States as a visiting scholar, and studied in the Department of Botany at the University of Texas and the Department of Cell Biology at Baylor College of Medicine. He returned to China in August 1983 and became director of the Cell Teaching and Research Department and the Cell Biology Research Department.

On 7 July 2025, Sun died in Shijiazhuang, Hebei, at the age of 87.

== Honours and awards ==
- 2001 Member of the Chinese Academy of Sciences (CAS)
- 2002 Science and Technology Progress Award of the Ho Leung Ho Lee Foundation
- 2010 State Natural Science Award (Second Class)
