= Ma Yugang =

Chinese nuclear physicist

- 马余刚
- Born: March 1968 (age 58); Yuyao, Zhejiang, China
- Education: Zhejiang University
- Scientific career
- Fields: Physics
- Workplaces: Fudan University; Chinese Academy of Sciences (CAS)

Chinese name
- Traditional Chinese: 馬餘剛
- Simplified Chinese: 马余刚
Transcriptions
Standard Mandarin
- Hanyu Pinyin: Mǎ Yúgāng

Ma Yugang (Chinese: 马余刚; born March 1968) is a Chinese nuclear physicist and an academician of the Chinese Academy of Sciences (CAS). He is currently a professor at Fudan University.

== Biography ==
Ma was born in Luting Township of Yuyao, Zhejiang in March 1968, while his ancestral home is in Ninghai County. He attended the Yuyao No. 8 High School. In 1989 he graduated from Zhejiang University, where he majored in physics. In 1994 he received his Doctor of Science degree from Shanghai Institute of Nuclear Research.

Ma's elder brother Ma Yuqiang is also a physicist and a professor at Nanjing University who elected an academician of the Chinese Academy of Sciences in 2021.

In 1994, he joined the Institute of Nuclear Research, Chinese Academy of Sciences (CAS) as a researcher. In 2015, he became a Fellow of the American Physical Society (APS). In 2017, was elected an academician of the Chinese Academy of Sciences (CAS).

== Award ==
- 2015 Achievement in Asia Award (Robert T. Poe Prize)
