= Xie Sishen =

Chinese physicist (1942–2022)

- 解思深
- Born: 18 February 1942; Qingdao, Shandong, China
- Died: 2 November 2022 (aged 80); Beijing, China
- Education: Peking University; Graduate School of Chinese Academy of Sciences; University of Colorado
- Scientific career
- Fields: Nanostructured material
- Workplaces: Institute of Physics, Chinese Academy of Sciences

Xie Sishen (Chinese: 解思深; pinyin: Xiè Sīshēn; 18 February 1942 – 2 November 2022) was a Chinese physicist, and an academician of the Chinese Academy of Sciences.

== Biography ==
Xie was born in Qingdao, Shandong, on 18 February 1942. After graduating from Peking University in 1965, he was despatched to Ningxia Iron and Steel Works as a technician. After resuming the college entrance examination, in 1978, he was admitted to the Graduate School of Chinese Academy of Sciences, where he received his master's degree in 1982 and his doctor's degree in 1983 under the supervision of academicians Lu Shanxue and Liang Jingkui. He joined the Chinese Communist Party (CCP) in November 1984. From 1984 to 1986 he was a postdoctoral fellow at the University of Colorado.

Xie returned to China in 1993 and continued to work at the Institute of Physics, Chinese Academy of Sciences. In 2013, he was recruited as dean of the School of Science, Renmin University of China.

On 2 November 2022, he died of an illness in Beijing, at the age of 80.

== Honours and awards ==
- 1989 State Natural Science Award (First Class) for the discovery of high tc oxide system
- 1991 State Natural Science Award (Third Class) for the synthesis, correlation and crystal structure of oxide superconductors at liquid nitrogen temperature
- 2000 Science and Technology Progress Award of the Ho Leung Ho Lee Foundation
- 2001 3rd Zhou Peiyuan Physics Prize
- 2002 State Natural Science Award (Second Class) for the preparation, structure and properties of aligned carbon nanotubes
- 2003 Member of the Chinese Academy of Sciences (CAS)
- 2004 Fellow of The Academy of Sciences for the Developing World (TWAS)
