= Feng Zefang =

- 冯泽芳
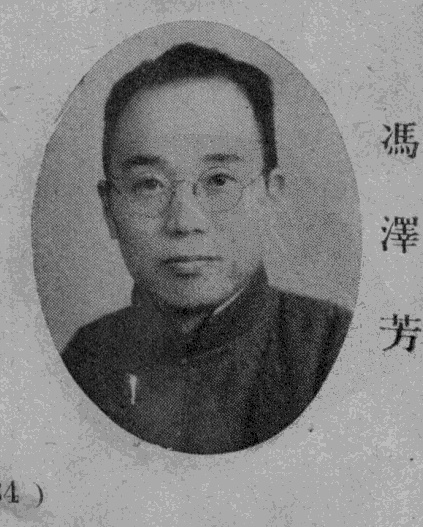
- Born: 20 February 1899; Yiwu, Zhejiang, Qing China
- Died: 22 September 1959 (aged 60); Anyang, Henan, China

Academic background
- Education: Seventh High School of Zhejiang Province; Nanjing Higher Normal School; Southeast University (BS); Cornell University (PhD)

Feng Zefang (simplified Chinese: 冯泽芳; traditional Chinese: 馮澤芳; 20 February 1899 – 22 September 1959) was a Chinese agronomist specializing cotton and an academician of Chinese of Academy of Sciences.

== Biography ==
On February 20, 1899, Feng was born into a farmer's family in Yiwu, Zhejiang Province, Qing China. The family was relatively well off, and in addition to farming the land, they also ran a small pharmacy. He attended elementary school in his hometown. In 1913, he was admitted to the Seventh High School of Zhejiang Province, and after graduating in 1917, because of his family's poverty, he taught for a year in a local elementary school. In 1918, he entered the tuition-free Nanjing Higher Normal School and graduated from it in 1921.

In 1921, the year he graduated, the Nanjing Higher Normal School was promoted to Southeast University. Feng Zefang began working at the university while earning undergraduate grades according to the school's regulations, and in four years he completed his studies and was awarded a bachelor's degree from Southeast University in 1925.

In 1930, Feng continued his studies at Cornell University in the U.S. He received his Ph.D. in 1933, with the thesis "A Genetic and Cytological Study of Species Hybrids of Asiatic and American Cottons", which was later published in the Botanical Gazette.

After receiving his PhD, Feng returned to China and worked for several government agencies including the National Cotton Improvement Institute and the National Agricultural Research Bureau, and was a part-time professor at the National Central University. Since 1933, he has been conducting field research on cotton in China. After the outbreak of the Second Sino-Japanese War, especially after the retreat of the Nationalist Government to Chongqing, he studied cotton in Yunnan.

In 1955, he was elected a member of the Chinese Academy of Sciences. In 1957, he moved his family to the Cotton Research Institute of the Chinese Academy of Agricultural Sciences, located in Anyang.

On September 22, 1959, he was persecuted to death during the Anti-Right Deviation Struggle.
