= Wu Yican =

Chinese scientist

- 吴宜灿
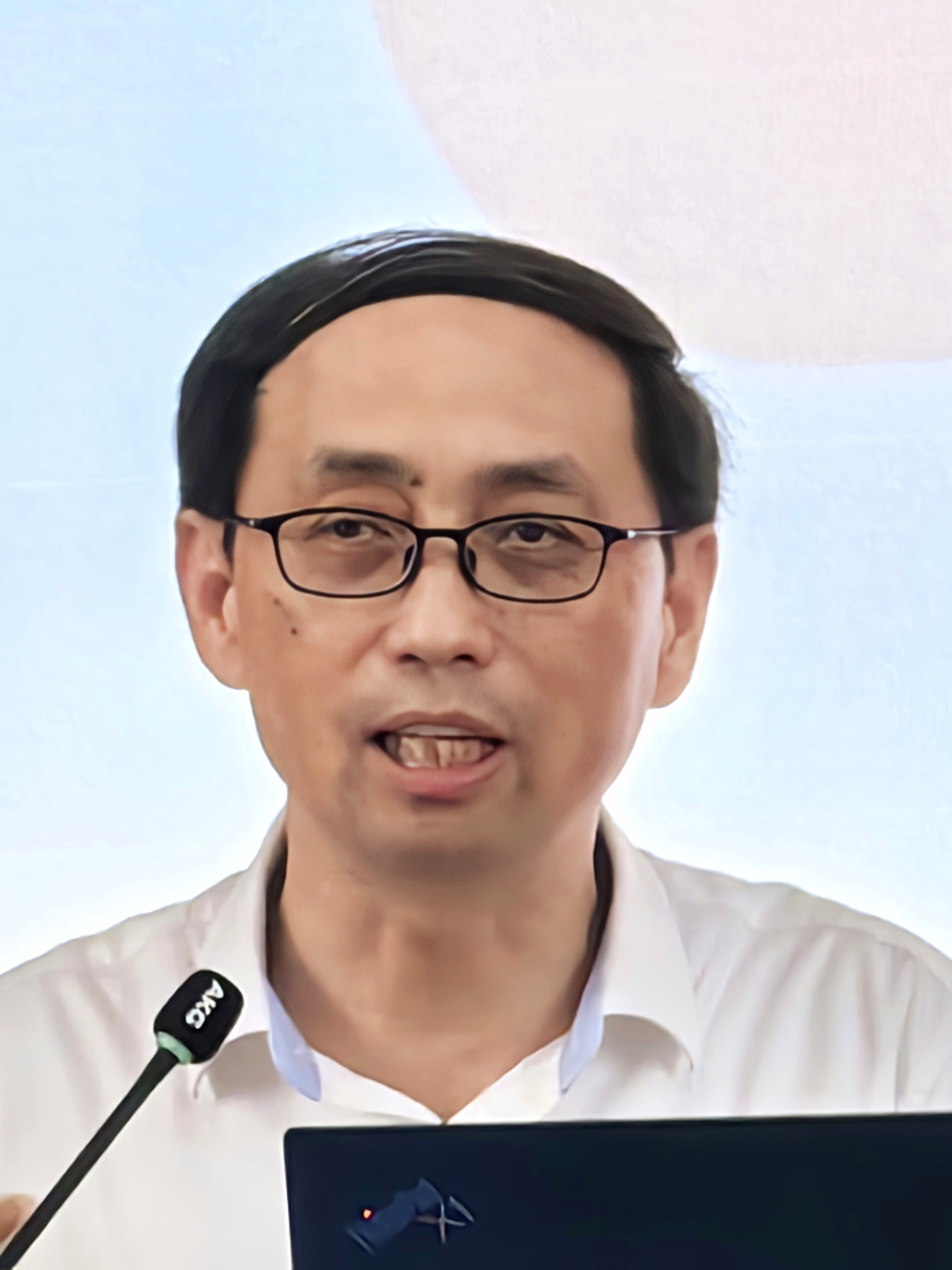
- Born: 1964 (age 61–62); Susong County, Anhui, China
- Education: Xi'an Jiaotong University
- Scientific career
- Fields: Nuclear neutron physics and application Technology
- Workplaces: Hefei Institutes of Physical Science

Chinese name
- Traditional Chinese: 吳宜燦
- Simplified Chinese: 吴宜灿
Transcriptions
Standard Mandarin
- Hanyu Pinyin: Wú Yícàn

Wu Yican (Chinese: 吴宜灿; born 1964) is a Chinese physicist specializing in nuclear neutron physics and application Technology. He works as a researcher and director of Hefei Institutes of Physical Science. He is also the director of Institute of Nuclear Energy Safety Technology, Chinese Academy of Sciences.

== Education ==
Wu was born in Susong County, Anhui in 1964. He secondary studied at Chengji High School. He received his bachelor's degree and master's degree from Xi'an Jiaotong University in 1985 and 1988, respectively. He earned his doctor's degree from the Institute of Plasma Physics, Chinese Academy of Sciences in 1992.

== Career ==
After graduation, he was assigned to Hefei Institutes of Physical Science. He is a member of the Chinese Nuclear Society (CNS), Chinese Nuclear Physics Society (CNPS), Chinese Institute of Electronics, and China Society of Radiation Protection. He is a member of the Computational Medical Physics Working Group (CMPWG) of American Nuclear Society (ANS).

== Honours and awards ==
- September 16, 2018 SOFT Innovation Prize
- November 15, 2018 ANS FED Outstanding Achievement Award
- March 17, 2019 Fellow of the International Atomic Energy Agency (INEA)
- November 22, 2019 Member of the Chinese Academy of Sciences (CAS)
