= Li Jiachun =

Chinese researcher, fluid mechanicist, and professor

Li Jiachun is a Chinese researcher, fluid mechanicist, and professor at the Institute of Mechanics, Chinese Academy of Sciences. In recognition of his contributions to fluid mechanics, he was awarded the Zhou Peiyuan prize in mechanics.

== Education and career ==
Li obtained a degree in 1962 from Fudan University and had his postgraduate education at the Institute of Mechanics, Chinese Academy of Sciences, in 1966, where he later became a research professor.

In 2003, he was elected a fellow of the Chinese Academy of Sciences.
