= Ye Zhizhen =

Chinese scientist (born 1955)

- 叶志镇
- Born: May 1955 (age 71); Cangnan County, Zhejiang, China
- Education: Zhejiang University
- Scientific career
- Fields: Inorganic photoelectric material
- Workplaces: Zhejiang University

Chinese name
- Traditional Chinese: 葉志鎮
- Simplified Chinese: 叶志镇
Transcriptions
Standard Mandarin
- Hanyu Pinyin: Yè Zhìzhèn

Ye Zhizhen (Chinese: 叶志镇; born May 1955) is a Chinese scientist currently serving as a professor and doctoral supervisor at Zhejiang University.

== Education ==
Ye was born in the town of Zaoxi, Cangnan County, Zhejiang in May 1955. During the Cultural Revolution, he was a sent-down youth for seven years. He earned his bachelor's degree in 1982, an master's degree in 1984, and doctor's degree in 1987, all from Zhejiang University.

== Career ==
After graduation, he worked there, where he was promoted to become professor in 1994. He was a visiting scholar at the Massachusetts Institute of Technology (MIT) between 1990 and 1992.

== Honours and awards ==
- 2005 State Natural Science Award (Second Class)
- November 22, 2019 Member of the Chinese Academy of Sciences (CAS)
