= Zhang Youqi =

Chinese scientist (1934–2022)

- 张佑启
- Born: 18 September 1934; British Hong Kong
- Died: 23 September 2022 (aged 88); Hong Kong, China
- Education: South China University of Technology; University of Wales; University of Adelaide
- Scientific career
- Fields: Civil engineering Computational mechanics
- Workplaces: University of Hong Kong; South China University of Technology

Chinese name
- Simplified Chinese: 张佑启
- Traditional Chinese: 張佑啟
Transcriptions
Standard Mandarin
- Hanyu Pinyin: Zhāng Yòuqǐ
- Wade–Giles: Chung Yau-Kai

Zhang Youqi (Chinese: 张佑启; Wade–Giles: Chung Yau-Kai; 18 September 1934 – 23 September 2022) was a Chinese scientist who was a professor at South China University of Technology, a former vice president of the University of Hong Kong, and an academician of the Chinese Academy of Sciences.

== Biography ==
Zhang was born in British Hong Kong, on 18 September 1934, while his ancestral home in Xinhui District of Jiangmen, Guangdong. He attended the Queen's College, Hong Kong. He was accepted to the Faculty of Medicine, University of Hong Kong but soon dropped out. In 1954, he entered South China University of Technology, where he majored in civil engineering. After graduating in 1958, he was assigned as a technician to Henan Architectural Design Institute in Zhengzhou, capital of north China's Henan province.

Zhang returned to British Hong Kong in 1961 and was admitted to the University of Wales, where he earned his doctor's degree in 1964. In 1967, he was recruited as an associate professor than full professor of the University of Calgary in Canada. He went on to receive his Doctor of Science degree from the University of Wales in 1973. He joined the faculty of the University of Hong Kong in August 197, becoming dean of the Faculty of Engineering the next year. In 1979, he entered the University of Adelaide where he received his Doctor of Engineering degree in 1982. In 1988, he rose to become vice president of the University of Hong Kong, and served until 1998. In November 2001, he was hired as a professor of South China University of Technology.

On 23 September 2022, he died in Hong Kong, at the age of 88.

== Honours and awards ==
- 1987 Fellow of the Royal Academy of Engineering
- 1990 State Natural Science Award (Second Class) for the development and application of the finite strip method
- 1995 British Empire Medal (ODE)
- 1999 Member of the Chinese Academy of Sciences (CAS)
- 1999 State Natural Science Award (Third Class) for the incremental harmonic balance method and generalized perturbation methods for strongly non-linear vibration
- 2002 Fellow of the Royal Society of Canada
- 2003 Silver Bauhinia Star
- 2003 Myklestad Prize by the American Society of Mechanical Engineers (ASME)
