= Zhou Qi (biologist) =

Chinese biologist

- 周琪
- Born: April 1970 (age 56); Harbin, Heilongjiang, China
- Education: Northeast Agricultural University
- Scientific career
- Fields: Cytology
- Workplaces: Chinese Academy of Sciences

Zhou Qi (Chinese: 周琪; pinyin: Zhōu Qí; born April 1970) is a Chinese biologist who is the current vice president of the Chinese Academy of Sciences, and an academician of the Chinese Academy of Sciences.

He was an alternate of the 19th Central Committee of the Chinese Communist Party.

== Biography ==
Zhou was born in Harbin, Heilongjiang, in April 1970. He earned a bachelor's degree in 1991, a master's degree in 1994, and a doctor's degree in 1996, all from Northeast Agricultural University. He carried out postdoctoral research at the Institute of Developmental Biology, Chinese Academy of Sciences in March 1997. Two years later, he became a postdoctoral fellow at the Department of Molecular Developmental Biology, French National Agricultural Research Center.

Zhou returned to China in December 2002 and that year became a researcher and doctoral supervisor at the Institute of Zoology, Chinese Academy of Sciences. In May 2004, he became deputy director of the State Key Laboratory of Reproductive Biology of Family Planning, rising to director in December 2011. He was honored as a Distinguished Young Scholar by the National Science Fund for Distinguished Young Scholars in 2005. He served as deputy director of the Institute of Zoology, Chinese Academy of Sciences in June 2012, and five years later promoted to the director position. He also served as vice president of the University of Chinese Academy of Sciences since January 2016. In November 2020, he was promoted to vice president of the Chinese Academy of Sciences.

== Honours and awards ==
- 2010 Science and Technology Progress Award of the Ho Leung Ho Lee Foundation
- December 2015 Member of the Chinese Academy of Sciences (CAS)
- 2018 Fellow of The World Academy of Sciences (TWAS)
