= Wei Rongjue =

Chinese physicist

- Born: 4 September 1916 (age 109); Shaoyang, Hunan China
- Education: University of Nanjing
- Known for: Acoustics
- Scientific career
- Fields: physics

Wei Rongjue (born 4 September 1916) was a Chinese physicist and professor at Nanjing University. In 1952, he was appointed chairman of the physics department at Nanjing University.

Wei is a member of the Chinese Academy of Sciences.

== Early life and education ==
Wei was born in Shaoyang, Hunan, on 4 September 1916. He obtained a bachelor's degree in physics in 1936 from the University of Nanking, a master's degree in 1947 from Nanjing University, and a doctorate degree in physics from the University of Illinois in 1950.
