= Jiang Hualiang =

Chinese scientist (1965–2022)

- 蒋华良
- Born: 10 January 1965; Wujin County, Jiangsu, China
- Died: 23 December 2022 (aged 57); Shanghai, China
- Education: Nanjing University; East China Normal University
- Scientific career
- Fields: Pharmacy
- Workplaces: Shanghai Institute of Materia Medica, Chinese Academy of Sciences

Chinese name
- Simplified Chinese: 蒋华良
- Traditional Chinese: 蔣華良
Transcriptions
Standard Mandarin
- Hanyu Pinyin: Jiǎng Huáliáng

Jiang Hualiang (Chinese: 蒋华良; 10 January 1965 – 23 December 2022) was a Chinese pharmacist who served as director of the Shanghai Institute of Materia Medica, and an academician of the Chinese Academy of Sciences.

Jiang was a member of the China Democratic League. He was a member of the 10th and 12th National Committee of the Chinese People's Political Consultative Conference.

== Biography ==
Jiang was born in Wujin County (now Wujin District of Changzhou), Jiangsu, in January 1956, but was raised in Yixing. In 1983, he entered Nanjing University where he received his bachelor's degree in organic chemistry in 1987. After completing his master's degree from East China Normal University in 1992, he attended the Shanghai Institute of Materia Medica where he obtained his doctor's degree under the supervision of Ji Ruyun and Chen Kaixian in 1995.

In 1995, Jiang began his academic career at the Shanghai Institute of Materia Medica. He moved up the ranks to become executive vice director in December 2004 and director in December 2013.

On 23 December 2022, Jiang died in Shanghai, at the age of 57.

== Honours and awards ==
- 2007 State Natural Science Award (Second Class)
- 2007 Science and Technology Progress Award of the Ho Leung Ho Lee Foundation
- 2017 Member of the Chinese Academy of Sciences (CAS)
- 2017 State Technological Invention Award (Second Class)

Academic offices
Preceded by Ding Jian (丁健)	Director of the Shanghai Institute of Materia Medica, Chinese Academy of Sciences; 2013–2022	Succeeded by TBA
