= Chen Xuesi =

Chinese chemist and researcher

- 陈学思
- Born: December 1959 (age 66); Changchun, Jilin, China
- Education: Jilin University; Waseda University; University of Pennsylvania
- Scientific career
- Fields: Polymer chemistry
- Workplaces: Changchun Institute of Applied Chemistry, Chinese Academy of Sciences (CAS)

Chinese name
- Traditional Chinese: 陳學思
- Simplified Chinese: 陈学思
Transcriptions
Standard Mandarin
- Hanyu Pinyin: Chén Xuésī

Chen Xuesi (Chinese: 陈学思; born December 1959) is a Chinese chemist and researcher at the Key Laboratory of Polymer Ecomaterials, Chinese Academy of Sciences (CAS).

== Early life and education ==
Chen was born in Changchun, Jilin in December 1959. In July 1982 he graduated from Jilin University, where he obtained a Bachelor of Science degree. In September 1988 he studied, then taught at the Changchun Institute of Applied Chemistry, Chinese Academy of Sciences (CAS). In October 1993 he pursued advanced studies in Japan, earning a doctor degree in engineering from Waseda University in March 1997. He was a postdoc at the University of Pennsylvania from April 1997 to May 1999.

== Career ==
He returned to China in June 1996, and that year became research associate at the Changchun Institute of Applied Chemistry, Chinese Academy of Sciences (CAS). He was promoted to researcher in December 1999.

== Honours and awards ==
- 2004 Distinguished Young Scholar by the National Science Fund
- November 22, 2019 Academician of the Chinese Academy of Sciences (CAS)
