= Ai Guoxiang =

Chinese researcher

Ai Guoxiang (February 1938), who publishes as Guoxiang Ai, is a Chinese researcher, inventor, and astronomist who specialises in space astronomy research and solar physics. He was a past President of the National Astronomical Observatories of China and an academician of the Chinese Academy of Sciences.

== Education and career ==
Guoxiang was educated at Ming De Middle School, Changsha, China and graduated in 1963 from the Department of Geophysics at the Peking University and joined the National Observatories of China. He received the First prize of Chinese National Science and Technology Progress Award in 1987 for inventing the Solar Magnetic Field Telescope and his research of the solar magnetic field and velocity filed has won the State Science and Technology Prizes (formerly the Natural Science Award). He is a member of the Shaw Prize's selection committee.
