= Zhu Senyuan =

Chinese rocket scientist (1930–2025)

- 朱森元
- Born: 26 October 1930; Liyang County, Jiangsu, China
- Died: 14 May 2025 (aged 94); Beijing, China
- Education: Nanjing University; Bauman Moscow State Technical University
- Scientific career
- Fields: Liquid rocket
- Workplaces: Fifth Research Institute of the Ministry of National Defense

Zhu Senyuan (Chinese: 朱森元; pinyin: Zhū Sēnyuán; 26 October 1930 – 14 May 2025) was a Chinese rocket scientist and an academician of the Chinese Academy of Sciences.

== Life and career ==
Zhu was born in Liyang County, Jiangsu, on 26 October 1930. He attended Xialin Primary School (夏林小学), Liyang Tongji Middle School (溧阳同济初级中学), and Jiangsu Provincial Suzhou High School (江苏省立苏州中学高中部). In the autumn of 1949, he was admitted to the Department of Aeronautics, Central University (now Nanjing University). In March 1950, he joined the Chinese New Democratic Youth League, and joined the Chinese Communist Party (CCP) in November 1952. In September 1953, he enrolled in the Moscow Institute of Automotive Mechanical Engineering in the Soviet Union. From October 1957 to December 1960, he studied at the Graduate School of Bauman Higher Institute of Technology (now Bauman Moscow State Technical University).

Zhu returned to China in December 1959 and in January 1961, Zhu joined the Rocket Engine Design Department of the Fifth Academy of the Ministry of National Defense. During the Cultural Revolution, from April 1969 to August 1970, he worked on a military reclamation farm in Beian, northeast China. He was recalled to the 11th Institute of the Fifth Research Institute of the Ministry of National Defense in September 1970. In 1993, he was appointed leader of the expert group on "Large Launch Vehicles and Rocket Engines" in the field of national high-tech aerospace by the Commission for Science, Technology and Industry for National Defense.

=== Personal life and death ===
Zhu married Xu Hongmin (徐鸿敏). On 14 May 2025, Zhu died in Beijing at the age of 94.

== Honours and awards ==
- 1985 State Science and Technology Progress Award (First Class) for the YF-73 Hydrogen Oxygen Engine
- 1995 Member of the Chinese Academy of Sciences (CAS)
