= Wang Huaimin =

Chinese scientist

- 王怀民
- Born: 1962 (age 62–63); Nanjing, Jiangsu, China
- Scientific career
- Fields: Distributed computing
- Institutions: National University of Defense Technology

Chinese name
- Traditional Chinese: 王懷民
- Simplified Chinese: 王怀民
Transcriptions
Standard Mandarin
- Hanyu Pinyin: Wáng Huáimín

Wang Huaimin (Chinese: 王怀民; born 1962) is a Chinese scientist specializing in distributed computing. He is the current vice-president of National University of Defense Technology and dean of its School of Computing.

== Early life ==
Wang was born in Nanjing, Jiangsu in 1962.

== Honours and awards ==
- November 22, 2019 Member of the Chinese Academy of Sciences (CAS)
