= Han Jiahuai =

Chinese cell biologist

- 韩家淮
- Born: 15 November 1960 (age 65); Huainan, Anhui, China
- Education: Peking University; Université libre de Bruxelles
- Awards: Changjiang Scholar Award (2009); Xiamen May 1st Labor Medal (2012); Overseas Chinese Contribution Award (2012); Tan Jiazhen Life Science Achievement Award (2013)
- Scientific career
- Fields: cell biology
- Workplaces: The Scripps Research Institute; Xiamen University

Han Jiahuai is a Chinese cell biologist and professor of the School of Life Sciences, Xiamen University. He was elected as a member of the Chinese Academy of Sciences in 2013. He is also a foreign member of the American Association of Immunologists and the American Society for Microbiology. Han is mainly known for his work in innate immune signaling, especially the discovery of p38 signaling pathway.

Han was born in January 1960 in Huainan, Anhui Province, China. He earned a master's degree at Peking University in 1985, and a doctor's degree at Université libre de Bruxelles in 1990. From 1990 to 1992 he did his postdoctoral research at the University of Texas Southwestern Medical Center. From 1993 to 2007 he worked at The Scripps Research Institute. He became a professor of Xiamen University in 2007, and also served as an adjunct professor at Scripps.

== Most cited papers ==
- Raingeaud, Joël; Gupta, Shashi; Rogers, Jeffrey S.; Dickens, Martin; Han, Jiahuai; Ulevitch, Richard J.; Davis, Roger J. (31 March 1995). "Pro-inflammatory Cytokines and Environmental Stress Cause p38 Mitogen-activated Protein Kinase Activation by Dual Phosphorylation on Tyrosine and Threonine". Journal of Biological Chemistry. 270 (13): 7420–7426. doi:10.1074/jbc.270.13.7420. PMID 7535770. (Cited 2647 times, according to Google Scholar.)
- Ono, Koh; Han, Jiahuai (1 January 2000). "The p38 signal transduction pathway Activation and function". Cellular Signalling. 12 (1): 1–13. doi:10.1016/S0898-6568(99)00071-6. PMID 10676842. (Cited 2034 times, according to Google Scholar.)
- Zarubin, Tyler; Han, Jiahuai (January 2005). "Activation and signaling of the p38 MAP kinase pathway". Cell Research. 15 (1): 11–18. doi:10.1038/sj.cr.7290257. PMID 15686620. S2CID 39769864. (Cited 1751 times, according to Google Scholar)
- Zhang, Shengjia; Han, Jiahuai; Sells, Mary Ann; Chernoff, Jonathan; Knaus, Ulla G.; Ulevitch, Richard J.; Bokoch, Gary M. (October 1995). "Rho Family GTPases Regulate p38 Mitogen-activated Protein Kinase through the Downstream Mediator Pak1". Journal of Biological Chemistry. 270 (41): 23934–23936. doi:10.1074/jbc.270.41.23934. PMID 7592586. (Cited 919 times, according to Google Scholar.)
