= Cheng Dan'an =

Chinese acupuncturist

- 承淡安
- Born: 1899; Jiangyin, Jiangsu, Qing China
- Died: 10 July 1957 (aged 57–58); Suzhou, Jiangsu, China
- Education: Tokyo College of Acupuncture
- Occupation: Acupuncturist
- Years active: 1930–1957
- Known for: Founding the first school of acupuncture in modern China

Chinese name
- Chinese: 承淡安
Transcriptions
Standard Mandarin
- Hanyu Pinyin: Chéng Dàn'ān
- IPA: [ʈʂʰə̌ŋ tân.án]

Cheng Dan'an (Chinese: 承淡安; 1899 – 10 July 1957) was a Chinese acupuncturist who founded the first school of acupuncture in modern China, made widespread changes to the practice, and served as chairperson of the Chinese Medical Association.

== Career ==
Cheng was born in 1899 in Jiangyin, Jiangsu. He first developed an interest in acupuncture in 1923, after suffering from severe lower back pain which was relieved by his father's acupuncture. He attended the Tokyo College of Acupuncture in Japan, before establishing the first school of acupuncture in modern China. The Jiangsu-based China Acupuncture Research Centre (中国针灸研究社) was open from 1930 till the Second Sino-Japanese War in 1937, by which time it had been renamed the China Acupuncture Technical College (中國針灸專門學校), implying that its degrees were accredited by the state. The school had its own publishing arm that produced numerous acupuncture-related works, many of which were authored by Cheng. Cheng also began the first acupuncture journal, Zhenjiu zazhi (針灸雜誌, literally Journal of Acupuncture), in 1933.

During the war, Cheng fled to Chongqing. He returned to Jiangsu in 1947 to discover that his acupuncture school had been destroyed; it was re-established in 1951 in Suzhou. In 1954, he served as a member of the Provincial People's Congress and headed the Jiangsu Provincial Congress of Chinese Medicine. The same year, he was appointed as director of a Nanjing-based school that would eventually be named the Jiangsu College of Chinese Medicine. In 1955, he was elected to the Chinese Academy of Sciences and appointed as the Chinese Medical Association's vice-chairperson and, subsequently, chairperson. Cheng suffered from ill health in his final years; he died of a heart attack on 10 July 1957 in Suzhou, at the reported age of 59.

== Acupuncture reforms ==
Writing in his 1931 treatise Zhongguo zhenjiu zhiliao xue (中國針灸治療學, literally Chinese Acupuncture and Moxibustion Therapeutics), Cheng laments that "the pathways of acupuncture points recorded by our forebears are mostly lacking in detail". His book was therefore an attempt at "(redefining) acupuncture points and meridians to correlate more closely with peripheral nerve distributions" in order to give acupuncture more credibility. The book, which was partly inspired by Song dynasty writings on acupuncture, was positively received upon its release and went into its eighth edition by May 1937.

Cheng made radical changes to the practice of acupuncture. Whereas acupuncture had previously been performed in tandem with bloodletting, so as to allow a "smooth flow" in the blood vessels, Cheng argued that acupuncture that resulted in blood being drawn was the product of an inept practitioner. Additionally, Cheng sought to uncouple acupuncture from astrology and divination. He refrained from thinking of time in terms of yin and yang, and considered the tradition of treating men and women on their left and right sides respectively to be mere superstition. Crucially, Cheng dispensed with bodkins and scalpels, instead preferring to perform acupuncture with the now-ubiquitous filiform metal needles.

According to Alexandra Dimitrova, Cheng is "widely considered the father of modern acupuncture". Bridie Andrews writes in The Making of Modern Chinese Medicine (2014): "Cheng Dan'an rescued Chinese acupuncture from superstition and oblivion, paving the way for scientific acupuncture to raise the status of Chinese medicine as a whole, as it did during the Communist era."
