= Wen Shizhu =

Chinese mechanical scientist

- 温诗铸
- Born: 2 November 1932; Fengcheng County, Jiangxi, China
- Died: 3 November 2023 (aged 91); Beijing, China
- Education: Tsinghua University
- Scientific career
- Fields: Mechanics
- Workplaces: Tsinghua University

Chinese name
- Simplified Chinese: 温诗铸
- Traditional Chinese: 溫詩鑄
Transcriptions
Standard Mandarin
- Hanyu Pinyin: Wēn Shīzhù

Wen Shizhu (Chinese: 温诗铸; 2 November 1932 – 3 November 2023) was a Chinese mechanical scientist who was a professor at Tsinghua University, and an academician of the Chinese Academy of Sciences.

== Biography ==
Wen was born in Fengcheng County (now Fengcheng), Jiangxi, on 2 November 1932. He was the seventh of eight children. He attended the Chongqing Nankai Middle School. In September 1951, he was accepted to the Department of Mechanical Engineering, Tsinghua University with the first place in the Hubei Provincial College Entrance Examination.

After graduating in 1955, he stayed for teaching. He joined the Chinese Communist Party (CCP) in 1956. In 1979, he became a visiting scholar at Imperial College London. He returned to China in 1981 and continued to teach at the Tsinghua University. He was made director of the Laboratory of Tribology and was promoted to full professor and doctoral supervisor. In 1985, he was responsible for the preparation of the State Key Laboratory of Tribology of Tsinghua University and was appointed director in 1988 after completion. On 1 April 2003, he recruited as a part-time professor at Henan University of Science and Technology.

On 3 November 2023, he died of an illness in Beijing, at the age of 91.

== Honours and awards ==
- 1999 Member of the Chinese Academy of Sciences (CAS)
- 2002 Science and Technology Progress Award of the Ho Leung Ho Lee Foundation
