= Guo Guangcan =

Chinese physicist

Guo Guangcan (simplified Chinese: 郭光灿; traditional Chinese: 郭光燦; Pe̍h-ōe-jī: Koeh Kong-chhàn; born 9 December 1942) is a Chinese physicist. He is a professor at the University of Science and Technology of China (USTC) and Peking University (PKU). He works on quantum information, quantum communication and quantum optic. He is an academician of the Chinese Academy of Sciences and The World Academy of Sciences.

== Biography ==
Guo was born in Hui'an County, Quanzhou, Fujian province in 1942.

== Honors ==
- 2003, State Natural Science Second Class Award
- 2003, AWARDEE OF THCHNOLOGICAL SCIENCES PRIZE
- 2003, members of the Chinese Academy of Sciences
- 2009, Fellow of THE WORLD ACADEMY OF SCIENCES

== Selected papers ==
1. Beating the standard quantum limit: phase super-sensitivity of N-photon interferometers
2. Efficient Scheme for Two-Atom Entanglement and Quantum Information Processing in Cavity QED
3. Experimental control of the transition from Markovian to non-Markovian dynamics of open quantum systems
4. Experimental investigation of classical and quantum correlations under decoherence
5. Experimental investigation of the entanglement-assisted entropic uncertainty principle
