= Mao Ming =

Chinese weaponeer (born 1962)

- 毛明
- Born: September 1962 (age 63); Xian'an District, Xianning, Hubei, China
- Education: Wuhan University; Beijing Institute of Technology
- Scientific career
- Fields: General technology of tank and armored vehicle
- Workplaces: No.201 Research Institute of China North Industries Group
- Doctoral advisor: Zhang Xianglin (张相麟)

Mao Ming (Chinese: 毛明; pinyin: Máo Míng; born September 1962) is a Chinese weaponeer currently serving as a researcher at the No.201 Research Institute of China North Industries Group.

== Education ==
Mao was born in Xian'an District of Xianning, Hubei in September 1962. In September 1979 he entered Wuhan Institute of Hydraulic and Electric Engineering (now Wuhan University), majoring in the Department of Mechanical Engineering, where he graduated in July 1983. He earned his master's degree from China North Vehicle Research Institute in December 1985 and doctor's degree in automobile engineering from Beijing Institute of Technology in March 1989.

== Career ==
He worked in China North Vehicle Research Institute since December 1985, what he was promoted to deputy director in November 1996 and to director in July 2001.

== Contributions ==
He was the chief designer of Type 99A tank, a Chinese third generation main battle tank (MBT).

== Honours and awards ==
- November 22, 2019 Member of the Chinese Academy of Sciences (CAS)
