= Chen Zijiang =

Chinese reproductive medicine expert

- 陈子江
- Born: October 1959 (age 66); Liuyang, Hunan, China
- Education: Shandong University
- Scientific career
- Fields: Reproductive medicine
- Workplaces: Shandong University

Chinese name
- Traditional Chinese: 陳子江
- Simplified Chinese: 陈子江
Transcriptions
Standard Mandarin
- Hanyu Pinyin: Chén Zǐjiāng

Chen Zijiang (Chinese: 陈子江; born October 1959) is a Chinese reproductive medicine expert currently serving as vice-president of Shandong University and dean of the Cheeloo College of Medicine, Shandong University.

== Biography ==
Chen was born in Liuyang, Hunan in October 1959. After the high school, she studied, then taught, at what is now the Cheeloo College of Medicine, Shandong University. In May 2013, she was promoted to become vice-president of Shandong University. She concurrently serves as dean of the Cheeloo College of Medicine, Shandong University since July 2015. In December 2017, she was elected a member of the Standing Committee of the Chinese Peasants' and Workers' Democratic Party.

She was a member of the 10th, 11th and 12th National Committee of the Chinese People's Political Consultative Conference.

== Honours and awards ==
- November 2019 Academician of the Chinese Academy of Sciences (CAS)
