= Xiao Wenjiao =

- 肖文交
- Born: December 1967 (age 58); Lianyuan, Hunan, China
- Education: Jilin University; China University of Geosciences (Beijing)
- Scientific career
- Fields: Sedimentary geotectonics
- Workplaces: Institute of Geology and Geophysics, Chinese Academy of Sciences (CAS)

Xiao Wenjiao (Chinese: 肖文交; pinyin: Xiāo Wénjiāo; born December 1967) is a Chinese geologist and researcher at the Chinese Academy of Sciences's Institute of Geology and Geophysics and Xinjiang Institute of Ecology and Geography.

== Education ==
Xiao was born in Lianyuan, Hunan in December 1967. In 1989 he graduated from Changchun Institute of Geology (now Jilin University). He received his master's degree in structural geology from China University of Geosciences (Beijing) in 1992 and doctor's degree in sedimentology from the Institute of geology, Chinese Academy of Sciences (CAS) in 1995, respectively.

== Career ==
In November 1995 he joined the Institute of Geology and Geophysics, Chinese Academy of Sciences (CAS), becoming associate research fellow in December 1998 and research fellow in December 2003. He was a visiting scholar at the ETH Zurich (1998–1999) and University of Hong Kong (2004). He was a visiting professor at the University of Leicester in 2005.

== Honours and awards ==
- 2010 5th Huang Jiqing Young Geological Science and Technology Award
- 2012 State Natural Science Award (Second Class)
- November 22, 2019 Member of the Chinese Academy of Sciences (CAS)
