= Hou Fanfan =

Chinese physician (born 1950)

Hou Fanfan (侯凡凡; born 1950) is a Chinese physician. She is currently Professor of Internal Medicine and Director of the Department of Nephrology of Nanfang Hospital, Southern Medical University.

== Biography ==
Hou was born in Shanghai, 1950. She studied at the First Military Medical University in 1970 and passed her medical examinations in 1979. In 1993, she received a doctorate degree in medicine from Zhongshan Medical University. Between June 1995 and December 1998, she was a visiting researcher at Harvard Medical School. Since her return to China in 1999, she has been Director of the Institute of Nephrology of Southern Medical University.

== Honours ==
In 2009, she was named an academician of the Chinese Academy of Sciences.

In 2012, she was elected as fellow to the World Academy of Sciences.

== Awards ==
- 2002 - "Technology Venus" of the General Logistics Department of the People's Liberation Army
- 2004 - Ding Ying Technology award
- 2005 - Chinese Physician award
- 2006 - Ho Leung Ho Lee award
