= Liu Sizhi =

Chinese biochemist

- 刘思职
- Born: 15 March 1904; Xianyou County, Fujian, Qing China
- Died: 18 August 1983 (aged 79); Beijing, China
- Education: Great China University; Southwestern University; University of Kansas
- Scientific career
- Fields: Biochemistry
- Workplaces: Peking University Health Science Center

Chinese name
- Simplified Chinese: 刘思职
- Traditional Chinese: 劉思職
Transcriptions
Standard Mandarin
- Hanyu Pinyin: Liú Sīzhí

Liu Sizhi (15 March 1904 – 18 August 1983) was a Chinese biochemist and an academician of the Chinese Academy of Sciences.

== Biography ==
Liu was born in Xianyou County, Fujian, on 15 March 1904. In 1921, he was admitted to the Great China University, majoring in the Department of Chemistry. In 1925, with the support of his father-in-law, he pursued advanced studies in the United States, first earning a BS degree from the Southwestern University in 1926 and then a Doctorate in Physical Chemistry from the University of Kansas in 1929.

After university, he returned to China and taught at his alma mater, the Great China University. In 1930, he was hired by the Peking Union Medical College (now Peking University Health Science Center), where he successively served as assistant, lecturer, associate professor, and professor (1946). During this period, he also studied at the Institute of Cell Physiology of William Caesar Institute in Germany and the University of Cambridge in the United Kingdom as a part-time student. He joined the Jiusan Society in 1956.

On 18 August 1983, he died of illness in Beijing, aged 79.

== Honours and awards ==
- 1957 Member of the Chinese Academy of Sciences (CAS)
