= Ye Xiangdong =

Chinese mathematician

- 叶向东
- Born: 1963 (age 62–63); Ningguo, Anhui, China
- Education: University of Science and Technology of China; Moscow State University
- Scientific career
- Fields: Topological dynamic system Ergodic theory
- Workplaces: University of Science and Technology of China

Chinese name
- Traditional Chinese: 葉向東
- Simplified Chinese: 叶向东
Transcriptions
Standard Mandarin
- Hanyu Pinyin: Yè Xiàngdōng

Ye Xiangdong (Chinese: 叶向东; born 1963) is a Chinese mathematician specializing in topological dynamic system and ergodic theory.

== Early life and education ==
Ye was born in Ningguo, Anhui in 1963, to an intellectual family. His mother was a Chinese teacher. His father was a math teacher. After the resumption of college entrance examination, he was accepted to the University of Science and Technology of China, where he received a bachelor's degree and master's degree. In 1986 he pursued advanced studies in Russia, earning a Ph.D from Moscow State University in 1991. He was a postdoc at the International Centre for Theoretical Physics (ICTP) in Trieste, Italy between 1991 and 1993.

== Career ==
Ye returned to China in 1993. He was professor at the University of Science and Technology of China in 1995, becoming vice chairman of the School of Science in 1997 and vice president and deputy Party secretary in May 2007.

== Honours and awards ==
- 1996 Distinguished Young Scholar by the National Science Fund
- 2000 "Chang Jiang Scholar" (or "Yangtze River Scholar")
- 2013 Chen Xingshen Mathematics Award
- November 22, 2019 Academician of the Chinese Academy of Sciences (CAS)
