= Yu Guirui =

Chinese scientist (born 1959)

- 于贵瑞
- Born: 1959 (age 66–67); Pulandian District, Dalian, Liaoning, China
- Education: Shenyang Agricultural University; Chiba University
- Scientific career
- Fields: Environmental ecology
- Workplaces: Institute of Geographical Sciences and Natural Resource Research, Chinese Academy of Sciences (CAS)

Chinese name
- Traditional Chinese: 于貴瑞
- Simplified Chinese: 于贵瑞
Transcriptions
Standard Mandarin
- Hanyu Pinyin: Yú guìruì

Yu Guirui (Chinese: 于贵瑞; born 1959) is a Chinese scientist currently serving as researcher and deputy director of the Institute of Geographical Sciences and Natural Resource Research, Chinese Academy of Sciences (CAS).

== Biography ==
Yu was born in Pulandian District, Dalian, Liaoning, in 1959. He received his master's degree in crop cultivation and farming and doctor's degree in soil physics and amelioration from Shenyang Agricultural University in 1984 and 1993, respectively. After graduation, he taught there. He pursued advanced studies at Chiba University in 1991, earning his doctor's degree in environmental physics in 1997. Then he was an associate professor at the Faculty of Horticulture, Chiba University.

Yu returned to China in 1998 and that same year became a researcher at the Institute of Geographical Sciences and Natural Resource Research, Chinese Academy of Sciences (CAS). In 2014 he was hired as a professor at the University of Chinese Academy of Sciences.

Yu is a member of the Jiusan Society.

== Honours and awards ==
- 2002 National Science Fund for Distinguished Young Scholars
- 2011 State Natural Science Award (Second Class)
- November 22, 2019 Member of the Chinese Academy of Sciences (CAS)
