= Xie Zuowei =

Chinese chemist

- 谢作伟
- Born: January 1964 (age 62); Cangnan, Zhejiang, China
- Education: Zhejiang University; University of Southern California
- Scientific career
- Fields: Organometallic chemistry
- Workplaces: Chinese University of Hong Kong

Chinese name
- Traditional Chinese: 謝作偉
- Simplified Chinese: 谢作伟
Transcriptions
Standard Mandarin
- Hanyu Pinyin: Xiè Zuówěi

Xie Zuowei (Chinese: 谢作伟; born January 1964) is a Chinese chemist and the dean of Faculty of Science, the Chinese University of Hong Kong. He is a member of the China Chemical Society.

== Education ==
Xie was born in Cangnan County, Zhejiang in January 1964. He secondary studied at Lingxi High School. After the resumption of college entrance examination, he entered Hangzhou University (now Zhejiang University), where he graduated in July 1983. He received his master's degree and doctor's degree from Shanghai Institute of Organic Chemistry, China Academy of Sciences (CAS) in 1986 and 1990, respectively. He did post-doctoral research at the University of Southern California from 1991 to 1995.

== Career ==
In 1995 he joined the faculty of the Chinese University of Hong Kong and was promoted to full professor in 2002. He is now the dean of Faculty of Science, the Chinese University of Hong Kong.

== Honours and awards ==
- 1997 State Natural Science Award (Third Class)
- 2001 National Science Fund for Distinguished Young Scholars
- November 2017 Member of the Chinese Academy of Sciences (CAS)
