= Xu Chunming =

Chinese chemist and professor

- 徐春明
- Born: February 1965 (age 61); Shouguang, Shandong, China
- Education: China University of Petroleum
- Scientific career
- Fields: Heavy oil chemistry Petrochemical industry Chemical reaction engineering
- Workplaces: China University of Petroleum

Xu Chunming (Chinese: 徐春明; pinyin: Xú Chūnmíng; born February 1965) is a Chinese chemist and professor at China University of Petroleum.

== Early life and education ==
Xu was born in Shouguang, Shandong in February 1965.

== Career ==
After the high school in 1981, he studied, then taught, at what is now China University of Petroleum. He served as vice chairman of its School of Chemical Science and Engineering in 1999, and three years later promoted to the Chairman position. In 2005 he was promoted again to become vice president of China University of Petroleum, a position he held until August 31, 2017. In 2008 he was recruited by the American Chemical Society (ACS) as associate editor of Energy & Fuels.

== Honours and awards ==
- November 22, 2019 Member of the Chinese Academy of Sciences (CAS)
