= Jin Yugan =

Chinese paleontologist (1937- 2006)

- 金玉玕
- Born: 26 December 1937; Dongyang County, Zhejiang, China
- Died: 26 June 2006 (aged 68); Nanjing, Jiangsu, China
- Education: Nanjing University
- Scientific career
- Fields: Paleontology
- Workplaces: Nanjing Institute of Geology and Paleontology, Chinese Academy of Sciences

Jin Yugan (Chinese: 金玉玕; pinyin: Jīn Yùgàn; 26 December 1937 – 26 June 2006) was a Chinese paleontologist and an academician of the Chinese Academy of Sciences. He is distinguished by his research on the stratigraphy of the Carboniferous and Permian.

== Biography ==
Jin was born in Dongyang County, Zhejiang, on 26 December 1937. Jin graduated in 1959 from the Department of Geology and Paleontology at Nanjing University and was involved in the study of brachiopods. In 1987, he joined the Chinese Communist Party. In 1989, he founded China's first open laboratory for paleobiology and stratigraphy. Subsequently, he conducted research at Meishan, Sichuan, where the Permian and the transition to the Triassic are well preserved. His research, including the stratigraphy of oil-bearing sediment basins in China and efforts to collaborate scientifically have been awarded.

In 2001, Jin was elected a member of the Chinese Academy of Sciences. He also served as the vice president of the International Palaeontological Association and chairperson of the ICS Subcommittee on Permian Stratigraphy and the Lopingium.

On 26 June 2006, he died from an illness in Nanjing, Jiangsu, at the age of 68.

== Honours and awards ==
- 2001 Member of the Chinese Academy of Sciences (CAS)
