= He Guowei =

- 何国威
- Born: March 1963 (age 63); Shanghai, China
- Education: Northwestern Polytechnical University
- Scientific career
- Fields: Hydrodynamics
- Workplaces: Institute of Mechanics, Chinese Academy of Sciences

Chinese name
- Traditional Chinese: 何國威
- Simplified Chinese: 何国威
Transcriptions
Standard Mandarin
- Hanyu Pinyin: Hé Guówēi

He Guowei (Chinese: 何国威; born March 1963) is a Chinese physicist and chairman of the Academic Committee in the Institute of Mechanics, Chinese Academy of Sciences in Beijing. He is an associated editor for Acta Mechanica Sinica and the deputy editor-in-chief for Theoretical and Applied Mechanics Letters.

== Biography ==
He was born in Shanghai in March 1963, while his ancestral home is in Shashi District of Jingzhou, Hubei. He received his bachelor's degree in mechanics, master's degree in computational mathematics, and doctor's degree in theoretical and applied mechanics from Northwestern Polytechnical University in 1983, 1988, and 1991, respectively.

After graduation, he did post-doctoral research at the Institute of Mechanics, Chinese Academy of Sciences (CAS), where he was promoted to assistant research fellow in 1993 and to researcher in 1999.

In January 1995 he became a postdoc at the Center for Theoretical Physics of French National Centre for Scientific Research (CNRS) at Marseille and Center for Astrophysics of CEA at Saclay in France, he remained there until April 1997, when he moved to Los Alamos National Laboratory as a visiting scholar. In July 2000 he joined the Langley Research Center as a senior staff scientist.

In 2009 he became an Associate Fellow of the American Institute of Aeronautics and Astronautics (AIAA). In 2015 he became a Fellow of the American Physical Society (APS). He served as the Director of State Key Laboratory for Nonlinear Mechanics in Beijing from 2005 to 2015. In November 2017 he was elected an academician of the Chinese Academy of Sciences (CAS).

== Award ==
He was honored as a Distinguished Young Scholar by the National Science Fund for Distinguished Young Scholars (国家杰出青年科学基金) in 2003.
