= Gong Xingao =

- 龚新高
- Born: June 1962 (age 64); Ansha Town, Changsha County, Hunan, China
- Education: Hunan Normal University
- Scientific career
- Fields: Computational physics
- Workplaces: Fudan University

Gong Xingao (simplified Chinese: 龚新高; traditional Chinese: 龔新高; pinyin: Gōng Xīngāo; born June 1962) is a Chinese physicist. He is a computational physicist best known for studying computational physics.

== Biography ==
Gong was born into a family of farming background in June 1962 in Ansha Town of Changsha County, Hunan. He is the youngest of seven children. His parents died early. Gong secondary studied at Changsha County No. 3 High School. In July 1982 he graduated from Hunan Normal University. He received his master's degree and doctor's degree in science from the Institute of Solid State Physics, Chinese Academy of Sciences in 1985 and 1993, respectively.

He joined the faculty of Fudan University in 2000.

In 2009 he was elected a member of the American Physical Society. He became a member of the Chinese Academy of Sciences on November 28, 2017.

== Awards ==
- 1999 China National Funds for Distinguished Young Scientists
- 2012 Second Class Prize of State Natural Science Award
