= Zhang Yuheng =

Chinese physicist

Zhang Yuheng is a Chinese researcher, physicist, and fellow of the Chinese Academy of Sciences. He specializes in condensed matter physics, and his research focuses on low-dimensional physics, spintronics, and superconductivity.

He founded the Yuheng Zhang equation, a law in condensed matter.
