= Xu Xiaobai =

Chinese environmental chemist (1927–2014)

- 许小白
- Born: May 28, 1927; Suzhou, Jiangsu, China
- Died: March 27, 2014 (aged 86); Beijing, China
- Honors: Academician, Chinese Academy of Sciences (1995)
- Scientific career
- Fields: Environmental chemistry; Inorganic chemistry; Analytical chemistry

Xu Xiaobai (May 28, 1927 – March 27, 2014), Suzhou, Jiangsu, environmental chemist, inorganic chemist, academician of the Chinese Academy of Sciences.

== Biography ==
Xu Xiaobai studied at Shanghai Nanyang Model Middle School in her early years. She graduated from the Department of Chemistry of Shanghai Jiaotong University in 1948. After that, she went to work at the department of chemistry of Academia Sinica as a student of chemist Liang Shuquan. Xu then worked at the Chinese Academy of Sciences after its establishment in 1950. In 1975, the Institute of Environmental Chemistry of the Chinese Academy of Sciences was established. She then began to engage in the analysis and research of environmental organic pollutants. From 1980 to 1982, Xu was a visiting scholar at the University of California, Berkeley, and later served as a visiting professor at the University of California, San Francisco. In 1995, she was elected as an academician of the Chinese Academy of Sciences. She died in Beijing on March 27, 2014, at the age of 87.

== Scientific career and accomplishments ==
Xu Xiaobai early engaged in inorganic chemistry research focused on Fluorescent lamp materials and high-temperature rare-earth compounds. Since the mid-1970s, she has been mainly engaged in analytical chemistry and pollution chemistry. She focused on polycyclic aromatic hydrocarbon and its derivatives. She won the first prize in the Natural Science Award of the Chinese Academy of Sciences.
