= Feng Dengguo =

Chinese scientist

- 冯登国
- Born: May 1965 (age 61); Jingbian County, Shaanxi, China
- Education: Shaanxi Normal University; Xidian University
- Scientific career
- Fields: Communication; Information security
- Workplaces: Beijing Academy of Science and Technology

Chinese name
- Traditional Chinese: 馮登國
- Simplified Chinese: 冯登国
Transcriptions
Standard Mandarin
- Hanyu Pinyin: Féng Dēngguó

Feng Dengguo (Chinese: 冯登国; born May 1965) is a Chinese scientist specializing in communication and information security. He is the current President of Beijing Academy of Science and Technology. He was a member of the Advisory Committee for State Informatization and director of State Key Laboratory of Information Security and National Computer Network Intrusion Prevention Center.

== Education ==
Feng was born in May 1965 in Jingbian County, Shaanxi. He received his bachelor's degree in applied mathematics from Shaanxi Normal University in 1988, and his master's degree in cryptography in 1993 and doctor's degree in communication and information systems in 1995 from Xidian University. In September 1995 he was a postdoctoral fellow at the Graduate School of Chinese Academy of Sciences (CAS).

== Career ==
He has been a researcher and doctoral supervisor at the Institute of Software, Chinese Academy of Sciences (CAS) since November 1997. He is also a doctoral supervisor at Beijing Academy of Science and Technology.

== Honours and awards ==
- 2000 State Natural Science Award (Second Class)
- 2000 National Science Fund for Distinguished Young Scholars
- 2005 State Natural Science Award (Second Class)
- November 22, 2019 Member of the Chinese Academy of Sciences (CAS)
