= Meng Daqiao =

Chinese scientist (1957-)

- 蒙大桥
- Born: September 1957 (age 68–69); Chunhua County, Shaanxi, China
- Education: Sichuan University
- Scientific career
- Fields: Nuclear materials and technology
- Workplaces: China Academy of Engineering Physics

Chinese name
- Traditional Chinese: 蒙大橋
- Simplified Chinese: 蒙大桥
Transcriptions
Standard Mandarin
- Hanyu Pinyin: Méng Dàqiáo

Meng Daqiao (Chinese: 蒙大桥; born September 1957) is a Chinese scientist specializing in nuclear materials and technology.

== Education ==
Meng was born in Chunhua County, Shaanxi in September 1957. After the resumption of college entrance examination, he entered Sichuan University, majoring in the Department of Chemist.

== Career ==
After graduating in 1980, he was assigned to the Ninth Design Institute of Machinery Industry as a technician and then assistant engineer. In December 1989 he joined the China Academy of Engineering Physics, where he successively worked as deputy director, director, and chief engineer.

== Honours and awards ==
- 1993 Science and Technology Progress Award (First Class)
- November 22, 2019 Member of the Chinese Academy of Sciences (CAS)
