= Lu Xueshan =

Lu Xueshan (Chinese: 陆学善; September 21, 1905 – May 20, 1981) was a Chinese physicist, who was a member of the Chinese Academy of Sciences.
