= Jiang Fengyi =

Chinese scientist and educator

- 江风益
- Born: 1963 (age 62–63); Yugan County, Jiangxi, China
- Education: Jilin University
- Scientific career
- Fields: Semiconductor
- Workplaces: Nanchang University

Chinese name
- Traditional Chinese: 江風益
- Simplified Chinese: 江风益
Transcriptions
Standard Mandarin
- Hanyu Pinyin: Jiāng Fēngyì

Jiang Fengyi (Chinese: 江风益; born 1963) is a Chinese scientist and educator in the fields of semiconductor. He is the current vice-president of Nanchang University. He has been hailed as "Father of silicon based luminescence in China". He is the director of the National Silicon-based LED Engineering Technology Research Center.

== Education ==
Jiang was born into a family of farming background in Yugan County, Jiangxi in 1963. After the resumption of college entrance examination, he entered Jilin University, majoring in nuclear physics, where he graduated in 1984. He was a postgraduate at the Changchun Institute of Physics (now Institute of Optics and Physics), Chinese Academy of Sciences (CAS) between September 1987 and December 1989.

== Career ==
After university, he joined the faculty of Jiangxi University of Technology as an assistant. He taught at Nanchang University since 1992, what he was promoted to associate professor in May 1992 and to full professor in May 1995. He is the vice-president of Nanchang University.

He was a delegate to the 19th National Congress of the Chinese Communist Party.

== Honors and awards ==
- 2016 State Technological Invention Award (First Class)
- November 22, 2019 Member of the Chinese Academy of Sciences (CAS)
- November 26, 2019 Laureate of AOA
