= Liu Huixian =

Chinese structural engineer and academician (1912–1992)

Liu Huixian (Chinese: 刘恢先; 1912–1992) was a Chinese structural engineer and academician of the Chinese Academy of Sciences. He is famous for his contribution to earthquake engineering and is seen as "the father of earthquake engineering".

Liu graduated from Southwest Jiaotong University (then Tangshan Jiaotong University) in 1933. He later received his master's degree from Cornell University and his doctorate from the University of Illinois. He taught in Zhejiang University and National Southwestern Associated University from 1938 until 1946. He married fellow scientist Hong Jing (洪晶), a physicist of the Harbin Institute of Technology, in 1941. In 1947, he went to the United States and taught in the Rensselaer Polytechnic Institute. In 1951, he returned to China and taught in Tsinghua University. In 1952, he joined the Jiusan Society and went to the Chinese Academy of Sciences. In 1978, he joined the Chinese Communist Party. He died in Harbin in 1992.

A statue of Liu was installed at Southwest Jiaotong University in 2013. There is also a prize for earthquake engineering named after Liu.
