= Zhai Wanming =

Chinese scientist

- 翟婉明
- Born: August 1963 (age 63); Jingjiang, Jiangsu, China
- Education: Southwest Jiaotong University
- Scientific career
- Fields: Urban rail transit
- Workplaces: Southwest Jiaotong University
- Academic advisors: Yu Chengshun

Zhai Wanming (Chinese: 翟婉明; pinyin: Zhái Wǎnmíng; born August 1963) is a Chinese scientist who is a professor at Southwest Jiaotong University. He was a delegate to the 19th National Congress of the Chinese Communist Party.

== Biography ==
Zhai was born into a family of farming background in Jingjiang, Jiangsu, in August 1963. He was the second of three children. After the resumption of college entrance examination, he was admitted to Southwest Jiaotong University, where he studied vehicle heat transfer under Yu Chengshun (于承训. After university, he stayed at the university, he was promoted to associate professor in 1991 and to full professor in 1994. In July 1994, he became director of its Train and Route Research Institute.

== Honors and awards ==
- 1995 National Science Fund for Distinguished Young Scholars
- December 2011 Member of the Chinese Academy of Sciences (CAS)
- 9 February 2021 Foreign associates of the National Academy of Engineering for contributions to the design and operation of high-speed rail transportation networks.
