= Dai Yongjiu =

Chinese meteorologist

- 戴永久
- Born: November 1964 (age 61); Wugang, Hunan, China
- Education: Jilin University
- Scientific career
- Fields: Atmospheric science
- Workplaces: Sun Yat-sen University

Dai Yongjiu (Chinese: 戴永久; pinyin: Dài Yǒngjiǔ; born November 1964) is a Chinese meteorologist and professor at Sun Yat-sen University.

== Education ==
Dai was born in Wugang, Hunan in November 1964. In 1987 he graduated from Jilin University, earning a bachelor's degree in mechanics. In 1995 he obtained his doctor's degree from the Institute of Atmospheric Physics, Chinese Academy of Sciences (CAS). After graduation, he was a research associate there.

== Career in the United States ==
He moved to the University of Arizona in August 1997 as an assistant research scientist and then to Georgia Institute of Technology as a research scientist in March 2000.

== Career in China ==
Dai was a professor at Beijing Normal University between June 2002 and August 2016. He was dean of School of Geography, Beijing Normal University in 2004, and held that office until 2008. He joined Sun Yat-sen University in February 2016.

== Honours and awards ==
- 2002 National Science Fund for Distinguished Young Scholars
- 2014 Science and Technology Award of the Ho Leung Ho Lee Foundation
- November 22, 2019 Member of the Chinese Academy of Sciences (CAS)
