= Hu Shihua =

Chinese mathematician

Hu Shihua (Chinese: 胡世华; 1912 – April 11, 1998) was a Chinese mathematician. He was a member of the Chinese Academy of Sciences.
