= Lin Haiqing =

Chinese physicist

- 林海青
- Education: University of Science and Technology of China
- Scientific career
- Fields: Computer physics
- Workplaces: Chinese University of Hong Kong; Beijing Computing Science Research Center

Lin Haiqing (Chinese: 林海青; pinyin: Lín Hǎiqīng) is a Chinese physicist.

== Education ==
In March 1978, Lin entered the University of Science and Technology of China, where he completed his bachelor's degree in physics in 1981. Then he pursued advanced studies in the United States, first earning Master of Science degree from Iowa State University in 1983 and then doctor of physics degree from University of California, San Diego in 1987.

== Career in the United States ==
He was a research Associate at the Brookhaven National Laboratory from 1987 to 1989 and the Los Alamos National Laboratory from 1989 to 1991. In 1991 he became a research assistant professor at the University of Illinois Urbana-Champaign, he remained there until 1995.

== Career in China ==
Lin joined the Department of physics, Chinese University of Hong Kong in August 1995, becoming chairman of the department in 2003. In August 2009 he was appointed chairman of the newly founded Beijing Computing Science Research Center.

== Honours and awards ==
- 2003 Fellow of the American Physical Society (APS)
- 2003 Distinguished Young Scholar by the National Science Fund (国家杰出青年科学基金)
- November 22, 2019, Member of the Chinese Academy of Sciences (CAS)
