= Li Xianhua =

Chinese geologist

- 李献华
- Born: 1961 (age 64–65); Nanjing, Jiangsu, China
- Education: University of Science and Technology of China
- Scientific career
- Fields: Isotope chronology Geochemistry
- Workplaces: Institute of Geology and Geophysics, Chinese Academy of Sciences (CAS)

Chinese name
- Traditional Chinese: 李獻華
- Simplified Chinese: 李献华
Transcriptions
Standard Mandarin
- Hanyu Pinyin: Lǐ Xiànhuá

Li Xianhua (Chinese: 李献华; born 1962) is a Chinese geologist who has served as researcher and doctoral supervisor at the Institute of Geology and Geophysics, Chinese Academy of Sciences (CAS).

== Education ==
Li was born in Nanjing, Jiangsu in 1961, while his ancestral home in Cangnan County, Zhejiang. After the resumption of college entrance examination, he entered University of Science and Technology of China, where he graduated in 1983. He received his master's degree and doctor's degree from the Institute of Geochemistry, Chinese Academy of Sciences (CAS) in 1985 and 1988, respectively.

== Career ==
He has been a researcher and doctoral supervisor at the Institute of Geology and Geophysics, Chinese Academy of Sciences (CAS).

== Honours and awards ==
- 2007 Fellow of the American Gem Society (AGS)
- 2011 Science and Technology Award of the Ho Leung Ho Lee Foundation
- 2011 State Natural Science Award (Second Class)
- November 22, 2019 Member of the Chinese Academy of Sciences (CAS)
