= Qian Zhidao =

Chinese chemist

Qian Zhidao (Chinese: 钱志道; November 3, 1910 – September 28, 1989) was a Chinese chemist. He was a member of the Chinese Academy of Sciences.
