= He Binglin =

Chinese chemist (1916–2007)

He Binglin (Chinese: 何炳林, 1916–2007) was a Chinese chemist born in Panyu County, Guangdong Province in China. He studied chemistry in the Southwestern Associated University (Chinese: 西南联合大学) (Nankai University) in Kunming, and graduated in 1942 before he went to Indiana University Bloomington, where he obtained his Ph.D. in chemistry in 1952. He returned to China and became a professor in Nankai University in Tianjin, where he set up the Polymer Chemistry Division in 1958. A variety of polymeric ion exchange resins, including strongly and weakly cationic and anionic exchangers, were developed in the research laboratories at Nankai and he also set up a factory administered by the university to produce a series of ion-exchangers for various applications. He is regarded as the founder of China's industry for ion exchange resins. In 1983, he became the founding director of the Institute of Polymer Chemistry at Nankai University. He authored several books on polymer chemistry and polymer materials and co-authored over 580 scientific articles. He was also elected to be a member of the Chinese Academy of Sciences of China in 1980. He received more than 30 awards for his research work.

A statue was erected in 2008 in Nankai University to commemorate his life-time achievements and contribution as an educator and as a prominent chemist.
