= Li Tibei =

Chinese astrophysicist

Li Tibei (Chinese: 李惕碚; born June 12, 1939) is a Chinese astrophysicist, who is a member of the Chinese Academy of Sciences. He was elected to the academy in 1997.
