= Tong Tanjun =

Chinese biochemist (1934–2022)

- 童坦君
- Born: 15 August 1934; Cixi County, Zhejiang, China
- Died: 25 December 2022 (aged 88); Beijing, China
- Education: Peking University Health Science Centre
- Spouse: Professor Zongyu Zhang
- Scientific career
- Fields: Biochemistry, Aging Research
- Workplaces: Peking University Health Science Centre

Tong Tanjun (Chinese: 童坦君; pinyin: Tóng Tǎnjūn; 15 August 1934 – 25 December 2022) was a Chinese Biochemist and Molecular Biologist, and an academician of the Chinese Academy of Sciences, as well as an academician of the Chinese Academy of Medical Sciences.

== Biography ==
Tong was born in Cixi County (now Ci'xi), Zhejiang, on 15 August 1934. His father was an accountant and his mother a housewife. He attended Shanghai Qingxin Primary School, Shanghai Yucai Middle School and Shanghai Guangshi High School. After high school, he studied, then taught, at what is now Peking University Health Science Center, where he successively worked as lecturer (1978), associate professor (1985), and professor (1988).

In 1978, Tong was selected, among a group of 52 Chinese scholars, by China's Ministry of Education from all scientific and technological disciplines in the country, to study abroad in the United States. He arrived in the US in the eve of historical visit by then-paramount leader Deng Xiaoping in Washington D. C. and normalization of the Sino-US relationship in 1979. He became the first visiting scholar from mainland China at the National Institutes of Health and Johns Hopkins University. Tong returned to China in 1981 and continued to teach at the Peking University Health Science Centre. In 1986, he became a visiting scholar at the University of California, Davis and New York University, and returned to China in 1988. He joined the Jiusan Society in 1988 and was an active member since. Tong conducted cancer research in his early career, but consolidated his interests later to focus on ageing related research in anticipation of a growing ageing population in China. He founded Peking University Research Center on Aging in 2004 and was the founding Director of the Center till his unanticipated passing. At Peking University Health Science Centre, Tong trained over one hundred graduate students over 40 years of his teaching and research career, with the very last lecture to undergraduate college students just a few months before the accident.

He was elected to the Chinese Academy of Sciences in 2005, Chinese Academy of Medical Sciences in 2019. He was on editorial boards of a number of professional journals; his research won numerous national level awards and honors in China.

After suffering a fall, Tong died in Beijing on 25 December 2022, at the age of 88.

== Honours and awards ==
- 2005 Member of the Chinese Academy of Sciences (CAS)
- 2019 Member of the Chinese Academy of Medical Sciences
