= Zhao Chenggu =

Chinese scientist

Zhao Chenggu (Chinese: 赵承嘏; December 11, 1885 – August 6, 1966) was a Chinese chemist. He was a member of the Chinese Academy of Sciences.
