= Li Dongxu =

Chinese scientist

- 李东旭
- Born: October 1956 (age 68); Changqing District, Jinan, Shandong, China
- Scientific career
- Fields: Spacecraft structure and design
- Institutions: National University of Defense Technology

Chinese name
- Traditional Chinese: 李東旭
- Simplified Chinese: 李东旭
Transcriptions
Standard Mandarin
- Hanyu Pinyin: Lǐ Dōngxù

Li Dongxu (Chinese: 李东旭; born October 1956) is a Chinese female scientist and professor at the National University of Defense Technology.

== Honours and awards ==
- November 22, 2019 Member of the Chinese Academy of Sciences (CAS)
