= Wang Chi (scientist) =

- 王赤
- Born: February 1967 (age 59); Longhui County, Hunan, China
- Education: University of Science and Technology of China; Massachusetts Institute of Technology
- Scientific career
- Fields: Space physics Space weather
- Workplaces: National Space Science Center, Chinese Academy of Sciences

Wang Chi (Chinese: 王赤; pinyin: Wáng Chì; born February 1967) is a Chinese scientist and the current director of the National Space Science Center, Chinese Academy of Sciences (CAS).

== Early life and education ==
Wang was born in Longhui County, Hunan in February 1967. He has a brother. He attended Sabating School. He secondary studied at Shaoyang No. 2 High School. Both his father and mother were officials in Shaoyang Water Conservancy Bureau. In 1990 he graduated from the University of Science and Technology of China. He received his master's degree in space physics from the National Space Science Center, Chinese Academy of Sciences (CAS) in 1992 and doctor's degree in physics from Massachusetts Institute of Technology in 1998, respectively. For the next few years he continued his post-doctoral research there.

== Career ==
Wang returned to China in January 2002 and that same year became researcher at the National Space Science Center, Chinese Academy of Sciences (CAS). He has been its director since January 2018.

He is a member of the Chinese Geophysical Society (CGS).

== Honours and awards ==
- 2003 National Science Fund for Distinguished Young Scholars
- November 22, 2019 Member of the Chinese Academy of Sciences (CAS)
