= Yu Ruihuang =

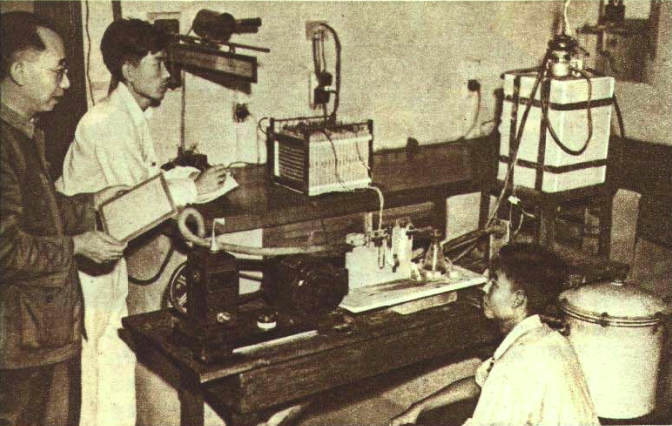
In 1953, Professor Yu Ruihuang researched X-ray tubes.

Yu Ruihuang (Chinese: 余瑞璜; March 10, 1906 – May 19, 1997) was a Chinese physicist, who was a member of the Chinese Academy of Sciences.
