= Sun Xin (physicist) =

Chinese physicist

- 孙鑫
- Born: July 1938; Yangzhou, Jiangsu, China
- Died: 27 May 2025 (aged 86); China
- Education: Fudan University; University of California, San Diego
- Scientific career
- Fields: Condensed matter physics
- Workplaces: Fudan University

Chinese name
- Simplified Chinese: 孙鑫
- Traditional Chinese: 孫鑫
Transcriptions
Standard Mandarin
- Hanyu Pinyin: Sūn Xīn

Sun Xin (Chinese: 孙鑫; July 1938 – 27 May 2025) was a Chinese physicist who was a professor at Fudan University, and an academician of the Chinese Academy of Sciences.

== Biography ==
Sun was born in Yangzhou, Jiangsu, in July 1938. He attended Yangzhou High School. In 1955, he was accepted to Fudan University, where he majored in the Department of Physics.

After graduation in 1960, Sun stayed to teach, he was promoted to teaching assistant in 1960 and to associate professor in 1978. In 1979, he pursued advanced studies at the University of California, San Diego in the United States. He returned to China in 1983 and continued to teach at Fudan University.

On 27 May 2025, Sun died in Shanghai, at the age of 86.

== Honours and awards ==
- 2013 Member of the Chinese Academy of Sciences (CAS)
