= Wei Kemei =

Chinese chemical engineer (1939 to 2014)

- 魏可镁
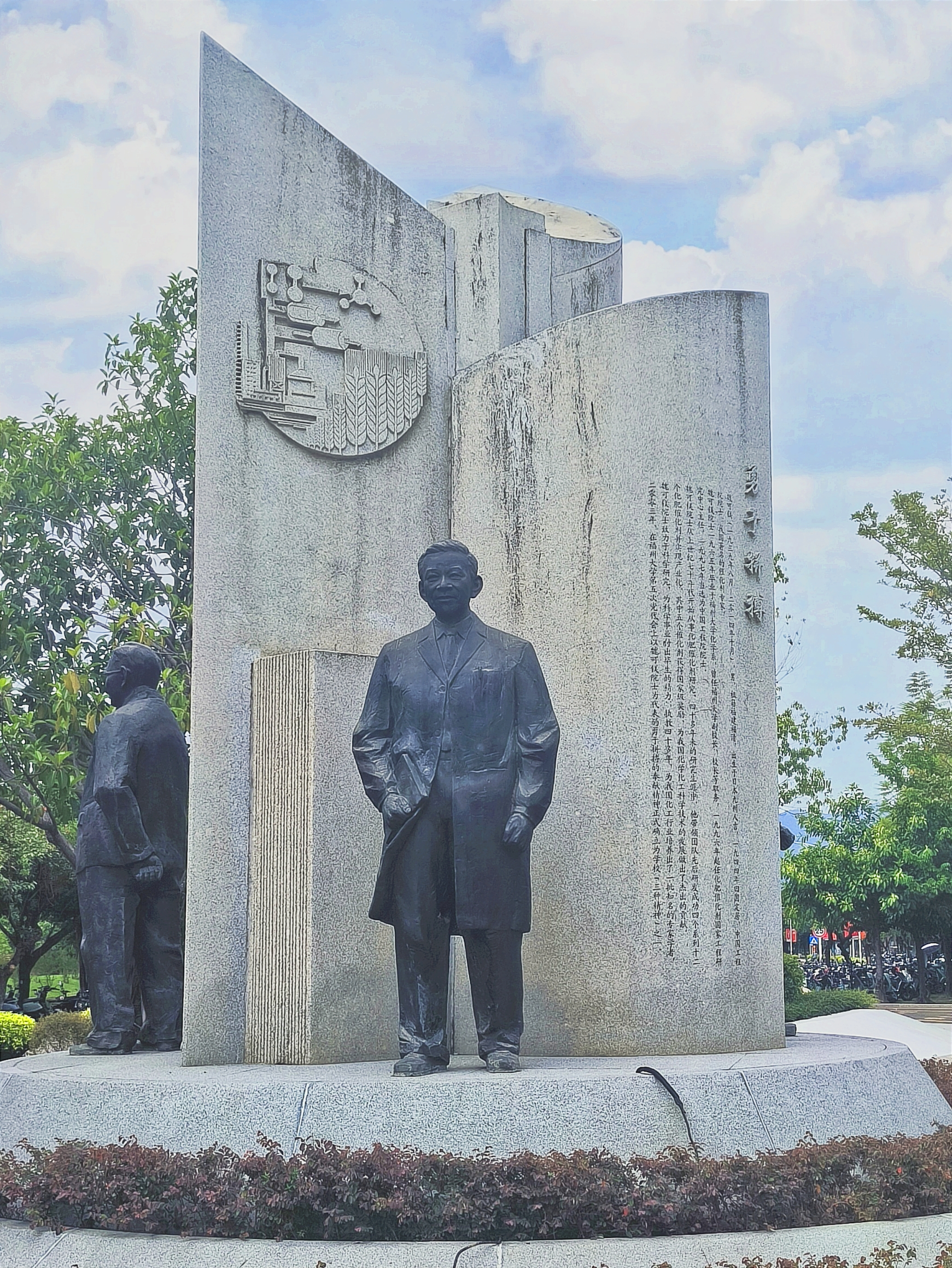
- Statue of Wei Kemei at Fuzhou University
- Born: August 29, 1939; Hitoyoshi, Kumamoto, Japan
- Died: October 23, 2014 (aged 75); Fuzhou, Fujian, China
- Awards: Member of the Chinese Academy of Engineering
- Scientific career
- Fields: Catalytic engineering for fertilizer production
- Workplaces: Fuzhou University
- Doctoral advisor: Lu Jiaxi
- Notable students: Fu Xianzhi

Wei Kemei (August 29, 1939 – October 23, 2014) was a Chinese chemical engineer who specialized in developing catalysts for fertilizer production. He served as a professor and president of Fuzhou University and was a Chinese Academy of Engineering member. He has been described as a symbolic figure representing the university's spirit of dedication and perseverance.

Born in Hitoyoshi, Kumamoto Prefecture, Japan, Wei's ancestral home was Fuqing, Fujian province. He returned to China in 1944 and was raised and educated in Fuzhou. He graduated from the Department of Chemistry at Fuzhou University in 1965, majoring in physical chemistry.

From the 1970s onwards, he actively researched and developed ammonia synthesis catalysts and shift catalysts for the fertilizer industry. He received multiple national and provincial honors, including the National Outstanding Professional and Technical Talent Medal, the State Technological Invention Award, the State Science and Technology Progress Award, and the First Prize of Invention from the China Petroleum and Chemical Industry Federation.

In 2014, He died of a sudden illness due to overwork at the age of 75, shortly after continuing his work under significant workload. Along with Zhang Gumei and Lu Jiaxi, Wei is considered one of the symbolic figures of Fuzhou University's "Three Spirits." He was regarded as the embodiment of the spirit of dedication and perseverance. (Note: The "three spirits" of Fuzhou University refer to "the entrepreneurial spirit of hard work and perseverance represented by Comrade Zhang Gumei," "the rigorous and realistic academic spirit represented by Mr. Lu Jiaxi," and "the spirit of dedication and hard work represented by Academician Wei Kemei.")

== Early life and education ==
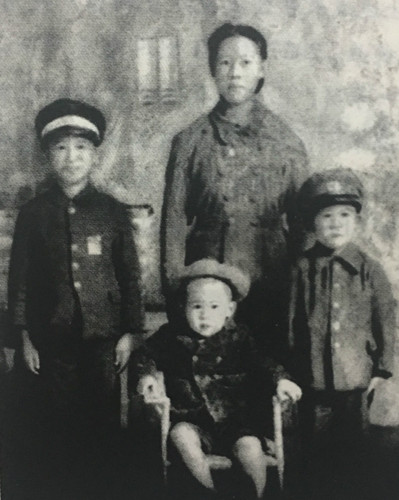
Wei Kemei with his elder brother and sister in Japan, 1942.

Wei Kemei was born in August 1939 in what is now Hitoyoshi, Kumamoto Prefecture, Japan. His father had worked in Japan for nearly 30 years. Due to the outbreak of the Second Sino-Japanese War, the family suffered severe ethnic discrimination while living in Japan. Due to growing wartime hostility and discrimination, the family decided to return to Shanghai at the end of 1944. After three years in Shanghai, the family could no longer sustain their livelihood and moved to Fuzhou. However, life there remained difficult, and two years later, they relocated again to their ancestral home on Da Bian Island. After founding the People's Republic of China, Wei's family was classified as Poor and lower-middle peasants during the Land Reform Movement 1952 and received land.

As a teenager, Wei worked in the fields with his father and assisted local land reform officials by delivering messages and copying documents. Ma, A local team leader, repeatedly urged his father to return him to school. After moving to Fuzhou with his family, Wei enrolled at Xiaoqiao No. 4 Central Primary School in 1947 (the 36th year of the Republic of China calendar) and studied for three years. However, he was forced to drop out due to poverty. Three years later, he was allowed to return to school and skipped a grade to enter the fifth year. The following year, his academic performance earned him membership in the Communist Youth League of China. After graduating from primary school, Wei was admitted to Fujian Pingtan No.1 High School. He was promoted directly from junior high to senior high school without examination. In his final year of high school, he joined the Chinese Communist Party.

== Academic career ==
1960, after graduating from high school, Wei was admitted to the Department of Chemistry at Fuzhou University, majoring in physical chemistry. He studied under the renowned scientist Lu Jiaxi, and in 1965, after graduating, he was appointed as a teaching assistant due to his excellent performance.

=== Development of ammonia synthesis catalysts ===
In 1972, Wei Kemei was appointed head of the project team at Fuzhou University and was responsible for high-activity ammonia synthesis catalysts. Ammonia forms the industrial foundation of synthetic fertilizers, with approximately 110 million tons applied globally each year. As an agricultural powerhouse, the People's Republic of China leads the world in both production and demand for synthetic ammonia. Wei's team undertook an unprecedented catalyst research project at Fuzhou University to meet this demand. In 1973, a chemical plant in Fuzhou invested several hundred thousand Renminbi to build an ammonia synthesis catalyst production workshop. However, the lack of equipment, such as high-temperature furnaces capable of melting catalysts at 1700 °C and high-pressure activity testing devices, along with the high transportation costs of raw materials from Anhui Province, posed major challenges. To overcome these difficulties, Wei innovatively adopted alternative methods, such as using welding machines to replace high-temperature furnaces, designing and manufacturing furnaces himself, and traveling extensively throughout Fujian Province to investigate iron ore mines. After resolving these issues, Wei's team conducted over 1,000 days of production and testing in laboratories where toxic gases were potentially present. The team encountered hazardous incidents during the melting and testing, including gas leaks and boiler explosions. After eight years of development, the team introduced the A110-3 ammonia synthesis catalyst, which reached international technical standards and was widely adopted in Chinese fertilizer plants. This new catalyst, produced using iron sand resources from Fujian Province, reached world-class technical standards and filled a gap in the mainland Chinese catalyst market. It was widely adopted by major ammonia production plants nationwide and won the third prize of the State Technological Invention Award in 1983. Within Fuzhou University, Wei was appointed a lecturer in 1978 and promoted to associate professor in 1986.

=== Study visit to Japan ===
In 1987, Wei Kemei passed the standardized Japanese language examination in mainland China and was subsequently sent to the Chemical Technology Institute of the National Institute of Advanced Industrial Science and Technology in Tsukuba Science City, Japan, for a one-year research visit. At that time, Chinese researchers were often looked down upon by the Japanese scientific community, and his Japanese colleagues usually discriminated against Wei. Japanese researchers encountered experimental setbacks in a project involving synthesizing oxygen-containing compounds using non-precious metals. Wei proposed a novel solution and proved it successful through continuous testing. However, When applying for a patent for this project, the research institute placed the name of Wei Kemei, who independently completed the design and experiment, at a relatively lower position, and his affiliation was recorded as "Wei Kemei, Chemical Technology Institute, Japan." Wei objected to the decision and requested that his affiliation be corrected to "Fuzhou University, People's Republic of China." After the change was made, attitudes among his Japanese colleagues improved. Upon completing his research visit, he declined an invitation from ICI in the United Kingdom and chose to return to China.

=== Research career after returning to China ===
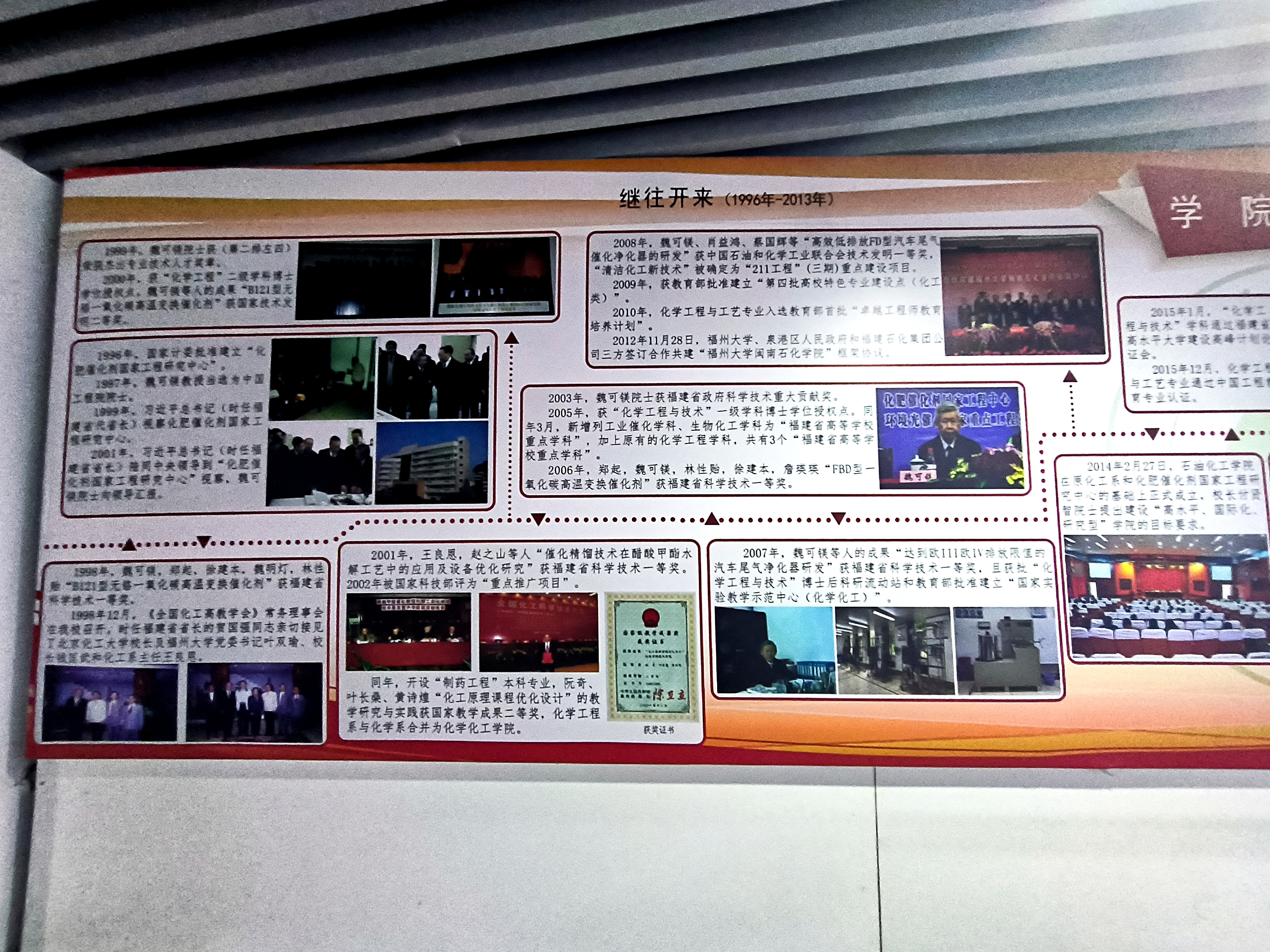
Exhibition at the College of Chemical Engineering, Fuzhou University (1996–2013) featuring Wei Kemei's contributions

After returning to China, Wei resumed his work at Fuzhou University, continuing his research and mentoring a new generation of scientists in related fields. In 1988, he was promoted to university professor and vice president. From the 1980s to the 1990s, his team developed a series of ammonia synthesis catalysts, including A201, B116, A202, B121, and FA401, contributed to cost efficiency and environmental protection in China's ammonia industry. These achievements earned multiple national and provincial awards. In 1995, the Chinese government approved an investment of 53.56 million yuan to establish the National Engineering Research Center for Fertilizer Catalysts in Fuzhou, the only national-level facility in China. Wei was appointed as the chief organizer. Beginning in 1996, he also launched research on automotive exhaust purification systems and second-generation ruthenium-based ammonia synthesis catalysts, making substantial progress over the following years. In 1997, Wei was elected as a member of the Chinese Academy of Engineering, becoming the first academician in the history of Fuzhou University. In 1999, he succeeded Qian Kuangwu as president of Fuzhou University. That same year, the National Engineering Research Center for Fertilizer Catalysts was officially completed, with Wei serving as its director since 1996. In early August 1995, Wei noticed recurring traces of blood in his nasal discharge. At the urging of his wife, a medical doctor, he underwent an examination at Fujian Provincial Hospital and was diagnosed with squamous nasopharyngeal carcinoma. To continue leading three key research projects and prepare for the upcoming visit of the dean of the College of Engineering at Nagasaki University, Wei went to the hospital for radiotherapy in the morning and returned to the laboratory in the afternoon to continue working. For treatment, he received 7,200 roentgen of radiation, lost 5 kilograms, and experienced side effects such as dry mouth, loss of taste, and memory decline. Despite health challenges during his treatment, Wei remained active in research and academic exchanges. In the early 2000s, Wei led his team in developing new-generation ruthenium-based ammonia synthesis catalysts, sulfur-resistant shift catalysts for large-scale ammonia plants, and FD-series automotive exhaust purifiers meeting Euro V emission standards. These achievements marked a breakthrough in breaking foreign monopolies in China's catalyst industry.

=== Social positions ===
In addition to his roles at Fuzhou University and the National Engineering Research Center for Fertilizer Catalysts, Wei Kemei held several positions within the People's Republic of China. From 1998 to 2008, he was a delegate to the 9th and 10th National People's Congresses. In 2001, he was elected as a member of the Fujian Provincial Committee of the Chinese Communist Party. As a returned overseas Chinese from Japan, Wei also actively engaged in overseas Chinese affairs. He served as a committee member of the All-China Federation of Returned Overseas Chinese and as the executive vice president of the World Fuzhou Fellowship Association. During his tenure as a deputy to the National People's Congress, he proposed motions related to protecting the rights and interests of returned overseas Chinese and their relatives and overseeing the enforcement of Chinese overseas affairs legislation. Wei also held other academic and advisory roles, including membership in the Discipline Review Committee of the Ministry of Education, vice chairman and later chairman of the Fertilizer Subcommittee of the Chemical Industry and Engineering Society of China, and advisor to the Fujian Provincial People's Government.

=== Later years ===
On 22 October 2014, Wei Kemei suffered a sudden cerebral infarction and cardiac arrest and was rushed to the hospital. He had been working under a significant workload in the days leading up to the incident. Despite emergency treatment, he died in the early hours of 23 October 2014 in Fuzhou at the age of 75. He had attended the 10th Academic Conference of the Division of Chemical, Metallurgical, and Materials Engineering of the Chinese Academy of Engineering just one day before his death.

== Legacy ==
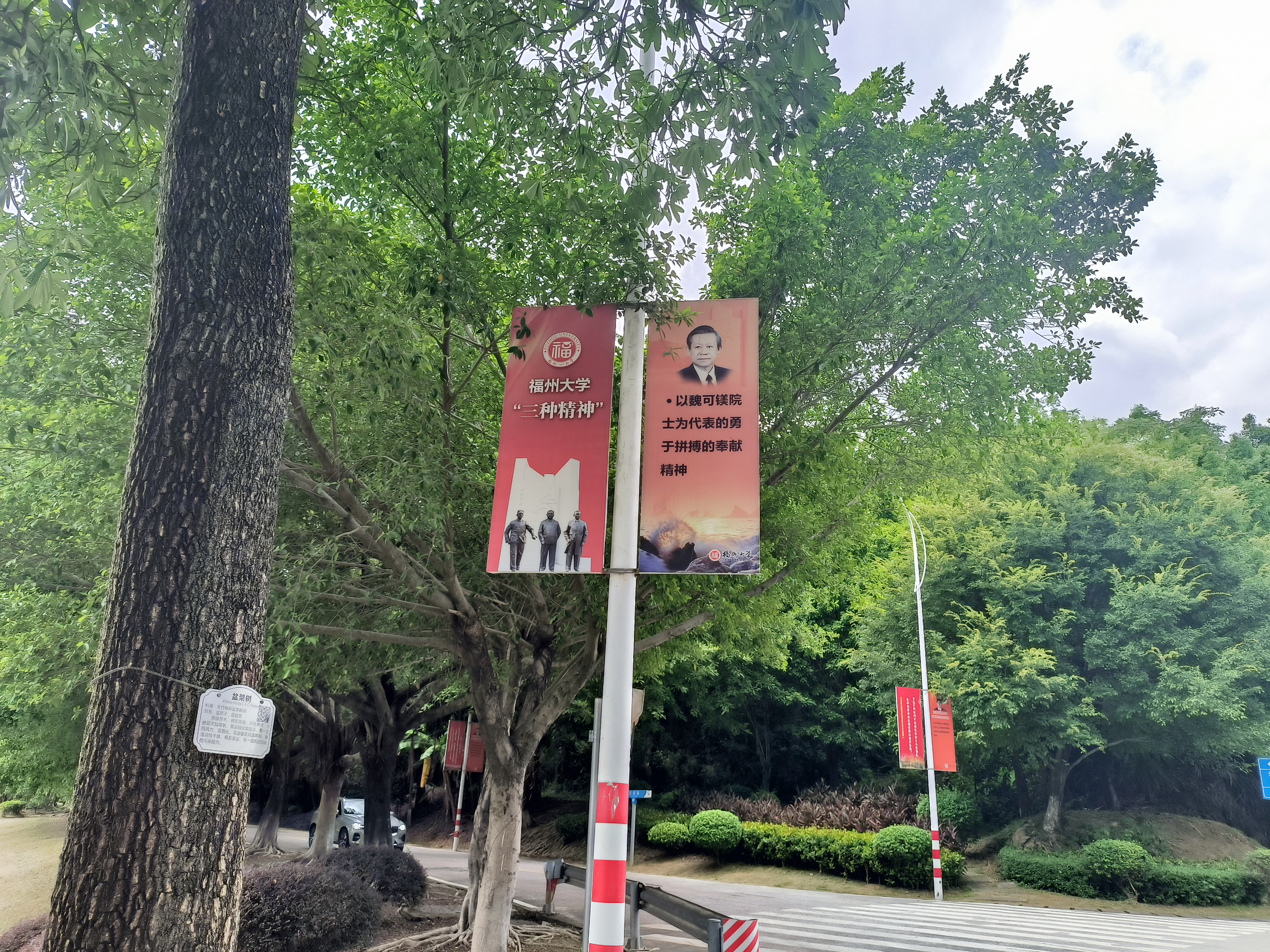
A banner at Fuzhou University promoting the "Wei Kemei Spirit"

A memorial ceremony for Wei was held at the Fuzhou Funeral Home on 27 October 2014, and Fuzhou University hosted a monument meeting on 31 October. In 2015, the university erected statues in honor of Wei Kemei, Zhang Gumei, and Lu Jiaxi. According to the Chinese Academy of Engineering, Wei has dedicated over four decades to education and research and has significantly cultivated scientific talent in China. The academy also recognized him for his academic rigor and personal integrity. The academy considered his death a significant loss to the chemistry, chemical engineering, and higher education fields in China. Fuzhou University later included what it termed the 'spirit of selfless dedication represented by Academician Wei' as part of its official "Three Spirits" values. The university described him as a dedicated educator and scholar who was respected by peers and students alike.

== Family ==
Wei Kemei's father was born in Niobi Village on Dabian Island, in Fuqing County, Fujian Province (now part of Aofeng Administrative Village, Sanshan Town, Fuqing). In the 1910s, at 25, his father left Mawei Port to work in Japan, where Wei Kemei was later born. We had one older sister and two older brothers. His wife, Lin Hengying, is a physician, and the couple had one daughter, Wei Zheng.

== Academic achievements and honors ==
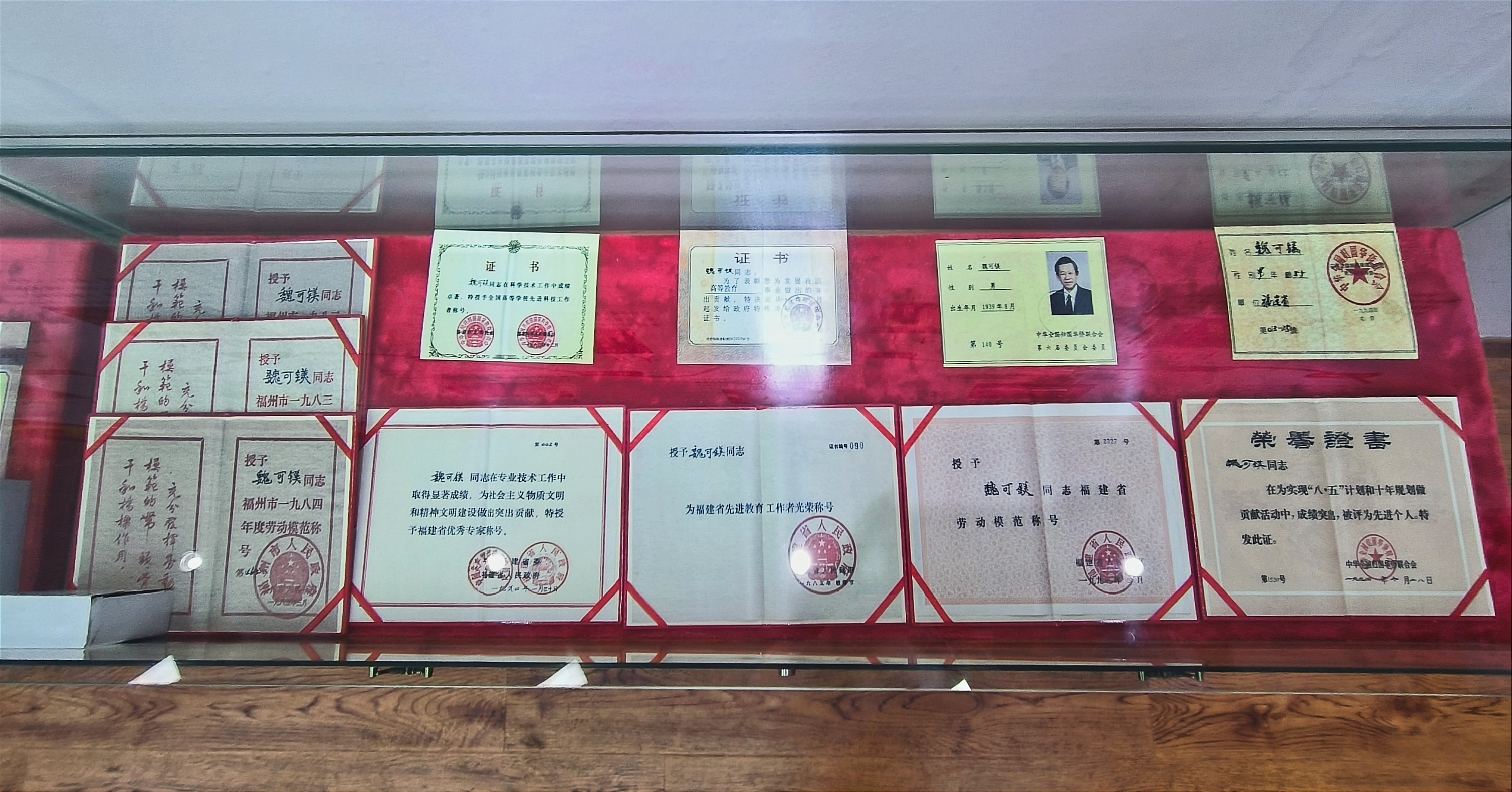
Certificates and credentials received by Wei Kemei for academic and social honors

Since the 1980s, Wei Kemei and his research team received numerous provincial and national-level academic and social honors. His social recognitions included "Model Worker," "Outstanding Scientific and Technological Worker," "Outstanding Returned Overseas Chinese," and the National Medal for Outstanding Professional and Technical Talents. His academic achievements were primarily reflected through breakthroughs in catalyst development:

=== Ammonia synthesis catalysts ===
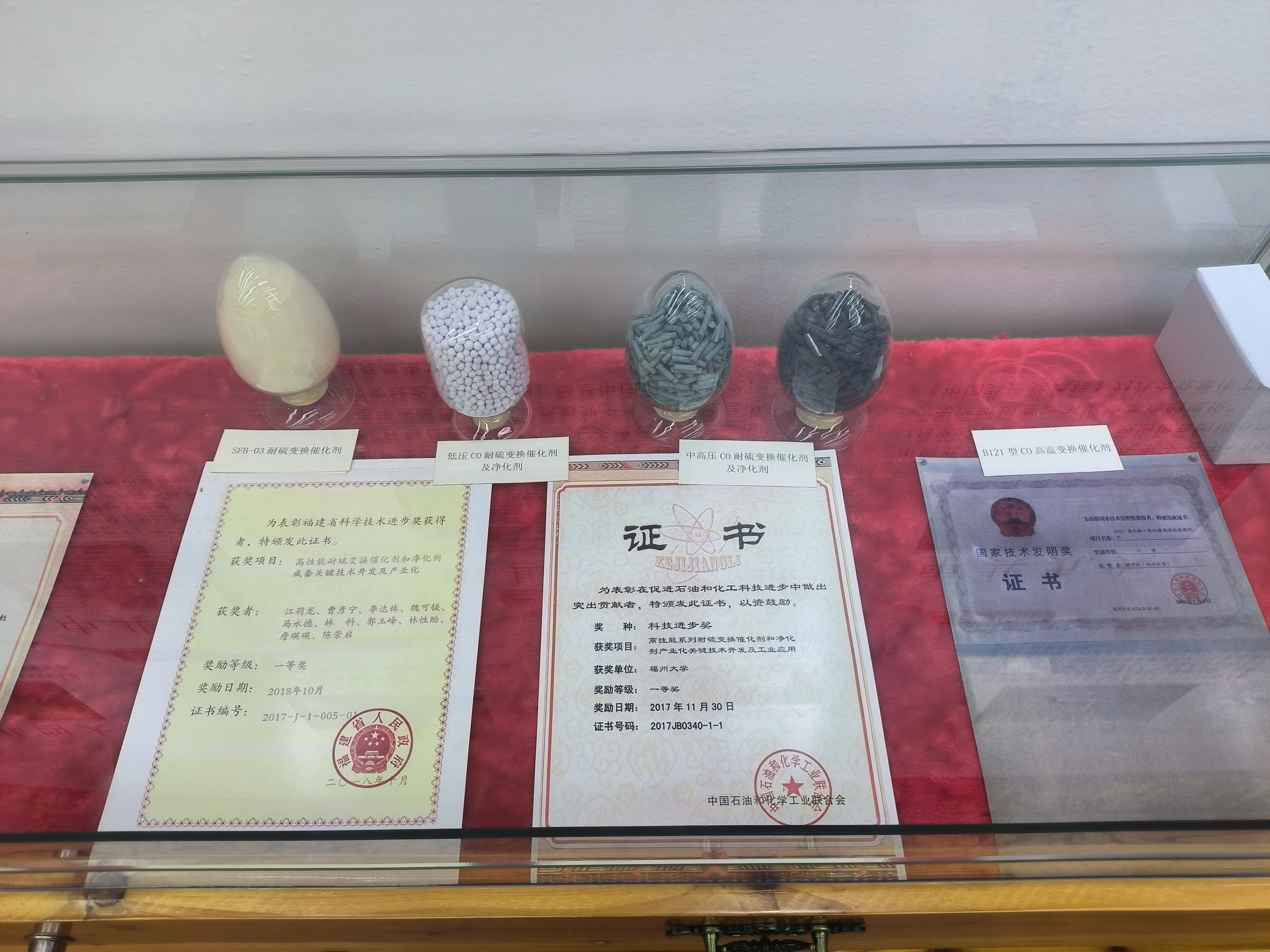
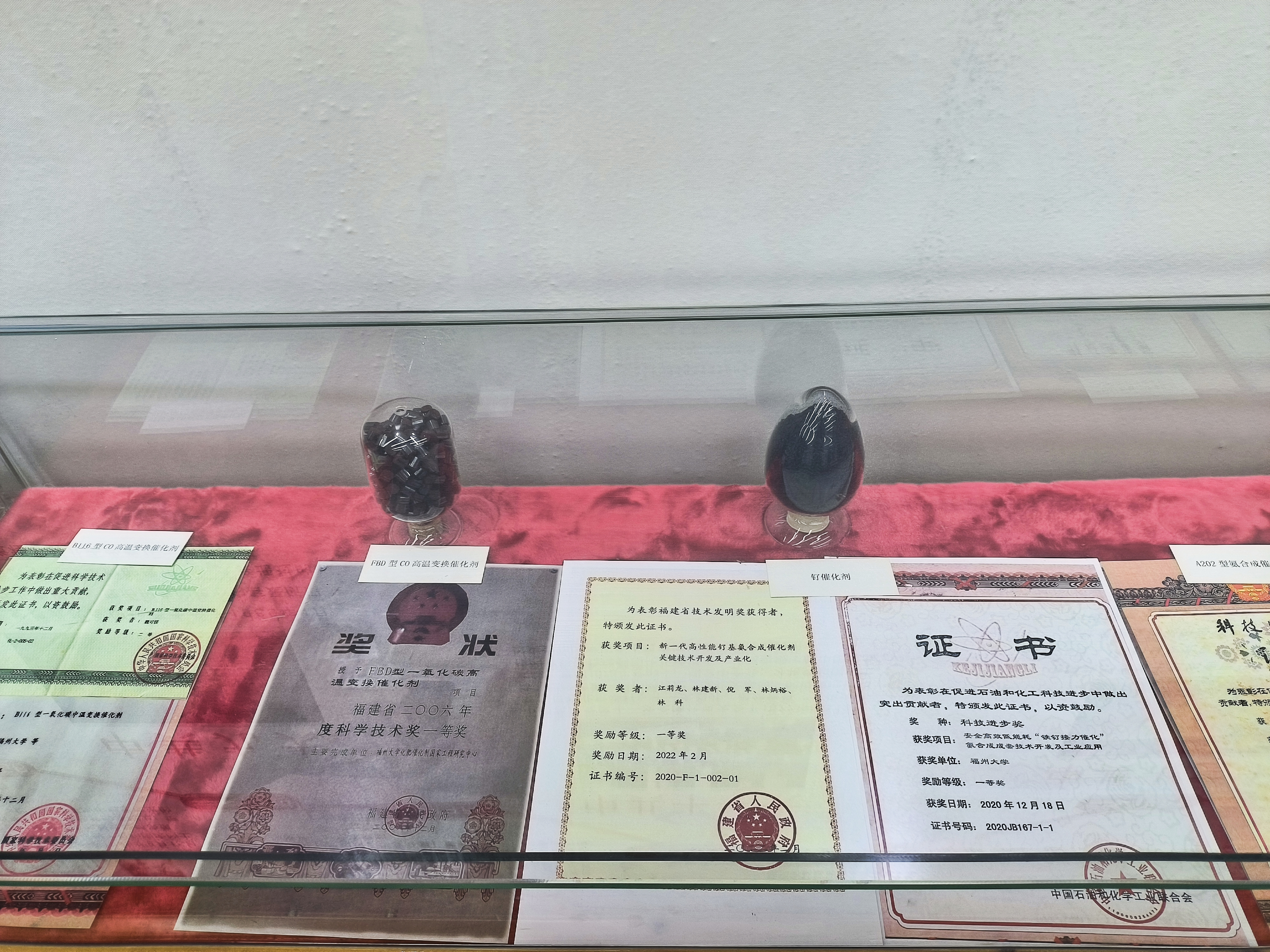
Catalysts and honors developed by Wei Kemei's team

In addition to the A110-3 iron-based catalyst that earned the 1983 State Technological Invention Award, Wei's team also developed the A201 (iron-cobalt) low-temperature high-activity ammonia synthesis catalyst, which received the third prize of the same award in 1985. The Ministry of Science and Technology (China) also listed it among the 500 major scientific achievements. 1991, the team developed a small-particle cobalt-containing catalyst, ending China's reliance on imported British iron-cobalt catalysts. In 1994, the A202 catalyst developed by the team generated an additional RMB 500 million in industrial value and RMB 128 million in profit during its first two years of production. In 1995, it was designated a key technology for national promotion. In 1996, it received the third prize in the State Science and Technology Progress Award and the third prize in the Wang Danping Science and Technology Award of Fujian Province. The team later developed the FA401 catalyst, which reduced production costs by approximately RMB 3,000 per ton compared to A202 and was successfully implemented in catalyst plants in Shandong and Hubei. Wei's team also researched low-chromium and chromium-free alternatives to address carcinogenic risks associated with iron-chromium catalysts. 1994, they developed the B116 low-chromium shift catalyst, reducing chromium content from 6–15% to 2%. In 1997, the B121 chromium-free high-temperature shift catalyst was developed, eliminating chromium and reducing per-ton cost by RMB 750 compared to the earlier B112 catalyst. B121 received the First Prize of the Fujian Provincial Science and Technology Progress Award in 1998 and the Second Prize of the State Technological Invention Award in 2000. In the 21st century, Wei developed a new generation of ruthenium-based ammonia synthesis and high-pressure sulfur-resistant shift catalysts for large-scale ammonia plants. These catalysts underwent industrial trials at his death in 2014 and won provincial awards in subsequent years.

=== Automotive exhaust catalysts ===
In May 1999, a vehicle exhaust catalyst developed by Wei's team passed evaluation at the Tianjin Automotive Research Institute and was confirmed to meet Euro II emission standards. The team subsequently developed automotive exhaust purifiers that successively met Euro III, Euro IV, and Euro V standards. In 2006, the FBD-type high-shift carbon monoxide catalyst received the First Prize of the Fujian Provincial Science and Technology Award. The following year, the project 'Development of Auto Exhaust Purifiers Compliant with Euro III and Euro IV Standards' won the same award. In 2008, the projects 'Development of Efficient and Low-Emission FD-type Automotive Exhaust Purifiers' and 'Three-Way Automotive Exhaust Catalyst and Its Preparation Method' were awarded the First Prize of the China Petroleum and Chemical Industry Science and Technology Invention Award and the China Patent Excellence Award, respectively.
