= Wang Enduo =

Chinese biochemist and molecular biologist (born 1944)

Wang Enduo (Chinese: 王恩多; born 18 November 1944), also known as En-duo Wang, is a Chinese biochemist and molecular biologist, and a professor at the Shanghai Institute of Biochemistry and Cell Biology. Recognized for her research on interaction between transfer RNAs (tRNA) and aminoacyl-tRNA synthetases (aaRS), she has been elected an academician of the Chinese Academy of Sciences and of The World Academy of Sciences.

== Biography ==
Wang was born on 18 November 1944 in Chongqing, Republic of China, with her ancestral home in Zhucheng, Shandong Province.

After graduating from the Department of Chemistry of Qufu Teachers College in 1965, she was admitted to the Shanghai Institute of Biochemistry to study under Chen-Lu Tsou, in the last class of graduate students accepted before the Cultural Revolution. When the Cultural Revolution began a year later, she was sent to work on a farm in Tianjin for a year and half. In 1975, she transferred to her alma mater Qufu Teachers College in Shandong as a chemistry lecturer, in order to be reunited with her husband.

When scientific research resumed after the end of the Cultural Revolution, in 1978 she was admitted for the second time to the Shanghai Institute of Biochemistry and became the first graduate student of the renowned scientist Wang Yinglai after the Cultural Revolution. She was awarded a Fogarty Fellowship by the US National Institutes of Health to conduct postdoctoral research at the University of California, Davis from 1984 to 1987.

After she returned to Shanghai in 1987, Wang Yinglai chose her to succeed him as principal investigator of the institute's research on the interaction between enzymes and nucleic acids. However, she was soon diagnosed with breast cancer and underwent surgery. She resumed her work four months after surgery.

Wang has published more than 100 papers in scientific journals. Her studies of the interaction between transfer RNAs (tRNA) and aminoacyl-tRNA synthetases (aaRS) are widely cited. She has advised more than 30 graduate students or postdoctoral researchers.

== Honours and recognition ==
Wang was elected an academician of the Chinese Academy of Sciences in 2005, and a fellow of The World Academy of Sciences in 2006, for advancing "understanding about the accuracy of protein biosynthesis based on interaction between aaRSs and tRNAs, the co-revolution of aaRSs/tRNA, and the mechanism of disease-associated mutations of tRNAs in mitochondria."

Wang has been awarded many prizes, including:

- Shanghai Science and Technology Progress Award, First Class (2000)
- State Natural Science Award, Second Class (2001)
- Shanghai Women Innovation Award (2002)
- Ho Leung Ho Lee Prize (2006)
- Outstanding Supervisor Award of the Chinese Academy of Sciences (2003, 2005, 2006, 2008)

Wang was elected to the 10th and 11th National People's Congress. In 2017, Shanghai Television broadcast a documentary of her life story as part of a series about ten famous scientists in biomedical research.

== Personal life ==
Wang is married to Yu Yingchuan (于英川), her college classmate.
