= State Natural Science Award (China) =

The State Natural Science Award (simplified Chinese: 国家自然科学奖; traditional Chinese: 國家自然科學獎; pinyin: Guójiā Zìrán Kēxué Jiǎng), or the "National Natural Science Award", is one of the State Science and Technology Prizes of the People's Republic of China. Awarded achievements are approved and granted by the State Council of China.

The State Natural Science Award is awarded to Chinese citizens who have made significant scientific discoveries in basic research and applied basic research in mathematics, physics, chemistry, astronomy, earth sciences, life sciences, information, materials, and engineering technology, etc., elucidating natural phenomena, characteristics, and laws. Since 2000, the State Natural Science Award only has two award grades: First Prize and Second Prize. The First Prize was the highest award in the field of natural sciences in China, before the Highest Science and Technology Award was established in 2000.

== History ==
The award was established by the State Council of China in 1956. It was then called the "Chinese Academy of Sciences Award"

In 1982, the award was formally called the "State Natural Science Award")

In 2025, China revised its national science and technology award guidelines to align more closely with national strategic priorities, emphasizing frontier science, major national needs, and research integrity. Under the updated system, the State Natural Science Award continues as one of the core national prizes. And, together with the State Technological Invention Award and the State Science and Technology Progress Award, amounts to fewer than 300 prizes biennially.

The State Natural Science Award is administered by the National Office for Science and Technology Awards (NOSTA), which oversees the nomination, evaluation, and final approval procedures.

== First Prize ==
The winning projects (public part) of the State Natural Science Award First Prize over the years are:

- 1956 (then called the "Chinese Academy of Sciences Science Award"):
1. Theory of functions of multiple complex variables on typical domains (by Hua Luogeng, Institute of Mathematics, Chinese Academy of Sciences)
2. Research on characteristic classes and embedding classes (Wu Wenjun, Institute of Mathematics, Chinese Academy of Sciences)
3. Engineering cybernetics (Qian Xuesen, Institute of Mechanics, Chinese Academy of Sciences)
- 1982 (Formally called the "First Prize of the State Natural Science Award" from 1982):
1. Research on the total synthesis of bovine insulin (Niu Jingyi, Gong Yueting, Zou Chenglu, Du Yucang (Shanghai Institute of Biochemistry, Chinese Academy of Sciences), Ji Aixue, Xing Qiyi (Peking University), Wang You, Xu Jiecheng (Shanghai Institute of Organic Chemistry, Chinese Academy of Sciences)
2. Earth Science Work During the Discovery of Daqing Oilfield (Li Siguang, Huang Jiqing, Xie Jiarong, Han Jingxing, Zhu Dashou, Lü Hua, Wang Maoji, Zhu Xia, Guan Shicong, etc. (Ministry of Geology); Zhang Wenzhao, Yang Jiliang, Zhong Qiquan, Weng Wenbo, Yu Boliang, Qiu Zhongjian, Tian Zaiyi, Hu Hanyuan, Zhao Shengzhen, Li Desheng, etc. (Ministry of Petroleum); Zhang Wenyou, Hou Defeng, Gu Gongxu, Gu Zhiwei (Chinese Academy of Sciences))
3. Coordination Field Theory Research (Tang Aoqing (Jilin University) and his research group: Sun Jiazhong (Jilin University), Deng Conghao (Shandong University), Zhang Gan'er (Xiamen University), Jiang Yuansheng (Jilin University), Yan Guosen (Sichuan University) (Students: Dai Shushan (Yunnan University), Liu Ruozhuang (Beijing Normal University), Zhao Jingyu (Changchun Institute of Optics and Fine Mechanics, Chinese Academy of Sciences), Gu Zheng (Sichuan University), Li Bofu (Jilin University))
4. Discovery of the Anti-Sigma-Negative Hyperon - (Wang Ganchang, Ding Dazhao, Wang Zhuxiang (Institute of Atomic Energy, Chinese Academy of Sciences))
5. Geological Maps of China and Asia (Wang Xiaoqing, Chu Xuchun, Huang Jiqing, Guo Wenkui, Cheng Yuqi, Wang Yuelun (Institute of Geology, Ministry of Geology), Wang Shaowei (Institute of Information, Ministry of Geology), Li Tingdong, Geng Shufang, Li Chunyu (Institute of Geology, Ministry of Geology), Wang Hongzhen (Wuhan Institute of Geology), Zhang Zonghu (Hydrogeology and Engineering, Ministry of Geology) Institute of Geology)
6. Goldbach Conjecture Research - (Chen Jingrun, Wang Yuan (Institute of Mathematics, Chinese Academy of Sciences), Pan Chengdong (Shandong University))
7. History of Science and Technology in China - (Joseph Needham et al. (Needham Research Institute, University of Cambridge))
8. Physical, Mechanical and Mathematical Theoretical Problems in the Design Principles of Atomic and Hydrogen Bombs (Peng Huanwu, Deng Jiaxian, Zhou Guangzhao, Yu Min, Zhou Yulin, Huang Zuqia, Qin Yuanxun, Jiang Zepei, He Guilian).
- 1987:
1. Comprehensive Study on the Uplift of the Qinghai-Tibet Plateau and its Impact on the Natural Environment and Human Activities (Liu Dongsheng, Shi Yafeng, Sun Honglie, Zheng Du, Chang Chengfa, Wu Zhengyi, Yin Jixiang, Wen Shixuan, Li Jijun, Zhang Jingwei, Li Wenhua, Tong Wei, Gao Yixin, Cheng Hong, Yang Yichou, Huang Fusheng, Wen Jingchun, Feng Zuojian, Zhou Yunsheng, Huang Wenxiu, Gao Dengyi, Chen Chuanyou, Han Yufeng, Li Bingyuan, Zhang Mingtao, Wu Sugong, Wang Jinting, Ni Zubin, Guan Zhihua, Zhang Zurong, Teng Jiwen, Zheng Xiyu, Lu Jimei, Deng Wanming, Zhang Yiguang, Xie Zichu, Ning Xuehan, Wang Liancheng, Shao Qiquan (Committee for Comprehensive Survey of Natural Resources, Chinese Academy of Sciences; Institute of Geography, Chinese Academy of Sciences; Institute of Geology, Chinese Academy of Sciences; Institute of Botany, Chinese Academy of Sciences; Lanzhou Institute of Glaciology and Geocryology, Chinese Academy of Sciences; Peking University, etc.)
2. Stability Study of Differential Dynamical Systems (Liao Shantao (Peking University))
3. East Asian Atmospheric Circulation (Ye Duzheng, Tao Shiyan, Zhu Baozhen, Chen Longxun (Institute of Atmospheric Physics, Chinese Academy of Sciences))
4. Molecular Orbital Graphical Theory and Its Applications (Tang Aoqing, Jiang Yuansheng (Jilin University))
5. Artificial Total Synthesis of Yeast Alanine Transfer RNA (Wang Debao, Wang Enbi, Wang You, Zheng Keqin, Zhu Yingshu, Chen Haibao, Chen Shen, Qiu Musui, Liang Zhenhe, Shen Qingxiang, Yang Zaiding, Hu Meihao, Wang Guihai, Wu Renlong, Yu Yunhua, Lu Yunhua, Chen Changqing (Shanghai Institute of Biochemistry, Chinese Academy of Sciences; Shanghai Institute of Cell Biology, Chinese Academy of Sciences; Shanghai Institute of Organic Chemistry, Chinese Academy of Sciences; Institute of Biophysics, Chinese Academy of Sciences; Peking University))
6. Proteins Quantitative Relationship between Functional Group Modification and its Bioactivity (Zou Chenglu, Xu Genjun, Sun Yukun, Du Yucang, Zhao Kangyuan, Zhou Haimeng (Institute of Biophysics, Chinese Academy of Sciences; Shanghai Institute of Biochemistry, Chinese Academy of Sciences))
7. Illustrated Flora of Higher Plants of China and Key to Families and Genuses of Higher Plants of China (Wang Wencai, Tang Yancheng and their research group (Institute of Botany, Chinese Academy of Sciences))
8. Research on Ancient Chinese Architectural Theory and Conservation of Cultural Relics (Liang Sicheng, Lin Huiyin, Mo Zongjiang, Xu Bo'an, Lou Qingxi, Guo Daiya (Tsinghua University))
9. Discovery and Research on Five-fold Symmetry and Ti-Ni Quasicrystal Phase (Guo Kexin, Ye Hengqiang, Li Douxing, Zhang Ze, Wang Daneng (Institute of Metal Research, Chinese Academy of Sciences))
10. Geochemistry of Stratabound Deposits in China (Tu Guangzhi, Wang Xiuzhang, Chen Xianpei, Zhang Baogui, Yang Weihua, Cheng Jiaping, Fan Wenling, Zhao Zhenhua, Yu Cimei (Institute of Geochemistry, Chinese Academy of Sciences))
11. Research on the Large Set of Disjoint Steiner Ternary Systems (Lu Jiaxi (No. 9 Middle School of Baotou City, Inner Mongolia))
- 1989:
1. Discovery of Oxide Superconductors in the Liquid Nitrogen Temperature Range (Zhao Zhongxian, Yang Guozhen, Chen Liquan, Yang Gansheng, Huang Yuzhen and their research group (Institute of Physics, Chinese Academy of Sciences))
2. Theory and Design of Software Engineering Environment Based on Temporal Logic (Tang Zhisong (Institute of Software, Chinese Academy of Sciences))
- 1991 (Vacant)
- 1993: Systematic Arrangement and Historical Origin of Families and Genus of Ferns in China - (Qin Renchang (Institute of Botany, Chinese Academy of Sciences))
- 1995 (Vacant)
- 1997:
1. Symplectic Geometric Algorithm of Hamiltonian System (Feng Kang et al. (Institute of Computational Mathematics and Scientific Engineering Computing, Chinese Academy of Sciences))
- 1999, 2001 (Vacant, Reform of the Science and Technology Award System was carried out in 1999.)
- 2002:
1. Research on organic molecular clusters and free radical chemistry- (Jiang Xikui, Ji Guozhen, Zhang Jintao, Fan Weiqiang, Shi Jiliang, et al. (Shanghai Institute of Organic Chemistry, Chinese Academy of Sciences))
- 2003:
1. Chengjiang Fauna and the Cambrian Explosion (Chen Junyuan (Nanjing Institute of Geology and Palaeontology, Chinese Academy of Sciences), Hou Xianguang (Yunnan University), Shu Degan (Northwest University))
- 2004 (Vacant)
- 2005 (Vacant)
- 2006:
1. Design, preparation, properties and applications of dielectric superlattice materials- (Min Naiben, Zhu Yongyuan, Zhu Shining, Lu Yalin, Lu Yanqing (Nanjing University))
2. Reactivity of multiple bonds in metal complexes- (Zhi Zhiming (University of Hong Kong))
- 2007, 2008 (Vacant)
- 2009:
1. Flora of China (Qian Chongshu (Institute of Botany, Chinese Academy of Sciences), Chen Huanyong (South China Botanical Garden, Chinese Academy of Sciences), Wu Zhengyi (Kunming Institute of Botany, Chinese Academy of Sciences), Wang Wencai (Institute of Botany, Chinese Academy of Sciences), Li Xiwen (Kunming Institute of Botany, Chinese Academy of Sciences), Hu Qiming (South China Botanical Garden, Chinese Academy of Sciences), Chen Yilin (Institute of Botany, Chinese Academy of Sciences), Chen Xinqi (Institute of Botany, Chinese Academy of Sciences), Cui Hongbin (Institute of Botany, Chinese Academy of Sciences), Zhang Hongda (Sun Yat-sen University), etc.)
- 2010, 2011, 2012 (vacant)
- 2013:
1. Discovery of Fe-based Superconductors with Tc＞40 K and Determination of Some Basic Physical Properties (Zhao Zhongxian (Institute of Physics, Chinese Academy of Sciences), Chen Xianhui (University of Science and Technology of China), Wang Nanlin (Institute of Physics, Chinese Academy of Sciences), Wen Haihu (Institute of Physics, Chinese Academy of Sciences), Fang Zhong (Institute of Physics, Chinese Academy of Sciences))
- 2014:
1. Research on network computing paradigms and their fundamental theories - (Zhang Yaoxue (Tsinghua University), Zhou Yuezhi (Tsinghua University), Lin Chuang (Tsinghua University), Ren Fengyuan (Tsinghua University), Wang Guojun (Central South University))
- 2015:
1. Multiphoton entanglement and interferometry (Pan Jianwei, Peng Chengzhi, Chen Yu'ao, Lu Chaoyang, Chen Zengbing (University of Science and Technology of China))
- 2016:
1. Discovery of A new Type of Neutrino Oscillation at the Daya Bay Reactor Neutrino Experiment - Wang Yifang, Cao Jun, Yang Changgen, Heng Yuekun, Li Xiaonan (Institute of High Energy Physics, Chinese Academy of Sciences)
- 2017:
1. Molecular basis underlying high-yield and superior-quality traits and breeding elite rice varieties by molecular design (Li Jiayang (Institute of Genetics and Developmental Biology, Chinese Academy of Sciences), Han Bin (Shanghai Institute of Life Sciences, Chinese Academy of Sciences), Qian Qian (China National Rice Research Institute), Wang Yonghong (Institute of Genetics and Developmental Biology, Chinese Academy of Sciences), Huang Xuehui (Shanghai Institute of Life Sciences, Chinese Academy of Sciences))
2. Aggregation-induced emission- (Tang Benzhong (Hong Kong University of Science and Technology), Qin Anjun (Zhejiang University), Dong Yuping (Beijing Institute of Technology), Li Zhen (Hong Kong University of Science and Technology), Sun Jingzhi (Zhejiang University))
- 2020:
1. Creation and application of ordered mesoporous polymers and carbon materials- (Zhao Dongyuan, Li Wei, Deng Yonghui, Zhang Fan (Fudan University))
2. "Nano-confined catalysis"- Bao Xinhe, Pan Xiulian, Fu Qiang, Deng Dehui (Dalian Institute of Chemical Physics).

== Second Prize ==
(List omitted due to space limitation.)

== Events ==
- On February 2, 2015, an IT engineer posted on the open-source code software platform GitHub, claiming that Zhang Yaoxue and his research team's project, "Research on network computing paradigms and their fundamental theories", which won the first prize of the 2014 National Natural Science Award, was suspected of plagiarizing open-source code software. The post caused great controversy.

== See also ==
- State Science and Technology Prizes
- Chinese Academy of Sciences
