= Yan Xiyun =

Chinese nanobiologist

- Born: February 1957 (age 69); Kaifeng, Henan, China
- Education: Henan Medical University, Heidelberg University
- Scientific career
- Fields: Nanobiotechnology
- Workplaces: Institute of Biophysics, Chinese Academy of Sciences; University of the Chinese Academy of Sciences
- Academic advisors: Bei Shizhang

Yan Xiyun (Chinese: 阎锡蕴; born February 1957) is a Chinese nanobiologist, academician of the Chinese Academy of Sciences, researcher and doctoral supervisor of the Institute of Biophysics, and professor of the University of the Chinese Academy of Sciences. Her main accomplishment was the discovery of nanozymes and its application in tumor diagnosis.

== Early life and career ==
Xiyun Yan attended Henan Medical University and obtained her B.S. degree in 1983. Following that, Yan studied cell biology in a lab at the Institute of Biophysics, Chinese Academy of Sciences (CAS) until leaving for Germany to obtain a doctorate in 1989. She graduated with a medical doctor’s degree from Heidelberg University and later traveled to the United States to engage in post-doctoral research at the Memorial Sloan Kettering Cancer Center in New York City. Yan returned to China in 1997 and was selected for the Hundred Talents Program by CAS. Since then, Yan has focused on tumor research, working to discover new targets and advancing techniques for tumor diagnosis and therapy.

== Research summary ==
Yan Xiyun focused mainly on tumor immunology and nanozymes research. In 2007, Yan discovered nanozymes and proposed that nanoparticles possess enzymatic properties. Yan was the first to integrate the use of nanomaterials as enzymes mimic to advance tumor diagnosis and therapy. This compelling discovery of nanozyme shifted the initial idea that nanoparticles are chemically inactive, which unveiled many new applications for nanoparticles in the fields of medicine, biotechnology, food production, environmental protection, and agriculture. Today, nanozymes is seen as an emerging field that combines both nanotechnology and biotechnology. Tumor immunology research led her to discover CD146, a melanoma cell adhesion molecule that is greatly expressed in tumor cells that leads to metastasis. Yan and her team were able to determine the ligands of CD146, and develop treatments for liver, pancreatic, and colon cancer by creating therapeutic humanized antibodies. The discovery of nanozymes has won China's State Natural Science Award. The work of Yan and her team has been recognized and published in Nature, Blood, PNAS, and other journals.
