= Li Lin (biochemist) =

Chinese biochemist (born 1961)

- Born: 1961 (age 64–65); Nanjing, Jiangsu, China
- Education: Nanjing University, Shanghai Institute of Biochemistry
- Spouse: Zhang Qin
- Scientific career
- Fields: Biochemistry
- Workplaces: Shanghai Institutes for Biological Sciences
- Doctoral advisor: Xu Genjun

Chinese name
- Chinese: 李林
Transcriptions
Standard Mandarin
- Hanyu Pinyin: Lǐ Lín
- Wade–Giles: Li Lin

Li Lin (Chinese: 李林; born 1961) is a Chinese biochemist and academician of the Chinese Academy of Sciences. He served as director of the Shanghai Institutes for Biological Sciences beginning in 2013, and was director of the Shanghai Institute of Biochemistry and Cell Biology (SIBCB) from 2004 to 2009. He was also a member of the 12th National People's Congress. His research focus is the Wnt signaling pathway.

== Biography ==
Li Lin was born in Nanjing, Jiangsu Province in 1961. After graduating from Nanjing University in 1983 with a bachelor's degree in biochemistry, he entered the Shanghai Institute of Biochemistry to study under Professor Xu Genjun, an enzyme specialist, and earned his Ph.D. in 1989. At the time, scientific research in China was poorly funded, and his research was limited by primitive facilities and supplies. He often went to slaughterhouses and wet markets himself to buy chicken and pig livers for his experiments.

From 1990 to 1992, Li worked as a postdoctoral researcher at the State University of New York, Stony Brook. He returned to the Shanghai Institute of Biochemistry (now Shanghai Institute of Biochemistry and Cell Biology, SIBCB) afterwards, at a time when most Chinese students and researchers chose to stay abroad for the better living standards and research facilities. He was promoted to full professor in 1993. His research is focused on the mechanisms of the Wnt signaling pathway.

Li served as deputy director of the SIBCB from 2002 to 2004, and director from 2004 to 2009. In 2013, he became director of the Shanghai Institutes for Biological Sciences, of which SIBCB is a constituent institute. He is an editor of many scientific journals.

== Honours and awards ==
Li has won many awards, including the CAS Young Scientist Award (1993), National Outstanding Young Scientist Award (1995), Outstanding Young Scholar Award by Hong Kong Qiushi Foundation (1996), and China Youth Science and Technology Award (1997). He was elected as an academician of the Chinese Academy of Sciences in 2011. He was also elected as a member of the 11th Chinese People's Political Consultative Conference and a member of the 12th National People's Congress.

== Personal life ==
Li is married to Zhang Qin (张芹), his classmate at Nanjing University. He considers Wang Yinglai, the founding director of the Shanghai Institute of Biochemistry, his role model.
