= China International Science and Technology Cooperation Award =

The China International Science and Technology Cooperation Award, full name "the International Science and Technology Cooperation Awards of the People's Republic of China" (Chinese: 中华人民共和国国际科学技术合作奖), is the highest honor of China for foreign individuals or organizations that have made outstanding contributions to the nation's scientific and technological development. Initiated by the State Council of China in 1994, the award is now one of the five State Science and Technology Prizes of the People's Republic of China.

== History ==
The China International Science and Technology Cooperation Award was initiated by the State Council of China in 1994. It was created to recognize and encourage international cooperation in science and technology, reflecting China's long-term strategy of integrating global scientific resources and promoting cross-border innovation.

In 1996, the prizes were awarded for the first time, to six international scientists.

In 1999, the State Council of China established the State Science and Technology Prizes framework, the China International Science and Technology Cooperation Award was designated as one of the five national awards, alongside the Highest Science and Technology Award, the State Natural Science Award, the State Technological Invention Award, and the State Science and Technology Progress Award.

In 2003, the Regulations on State Science and Technology Awards was revised in accordance with the Decision of the State Council.

In 2013, the Regulations was revised for the second time in accordance with the Decision of the State Council.

In 2020, the Regulations was revised for the third time.

In December 2022, China's embassy in the Netherlands held a ceremony to present the 2020 and 2022 awards to recipients whose recognition had been delayed due to the COVID‑19 pandemic.

In June 2024, following evaluation by the National Science and Technology Awards Committee and approval by the CPC Central Committee and the State Council, 10 foreign experts were awarded the 2024 prizes.

== Award criteria and implication ==
The Cooperation Award is conferred on foreigners or organizations that have made significant contributions to China's science and technology, in the conditions of

- The award is offered annually, and has no internal grading system (i.e., no first/second prizes).
- A maximum of 10 recipients may be selected each year.
- Candidates are nominated by Chinese ministries, research institutions, universities, and provincial governments.
- The Award medals and certificates (no money) are conferred by the State Council of China.

As part of the broader reform of China's national science and technology awards, the award continues to align with national needs and emphasizes research integrity and scientific contribution.

== Recipients ==
From 1995 to 2020, the award was granted to:

- 136 foreign scientists from 24 countries
- Plus three international organizations and one foreign institution

Recipients include leading figures in physics, chemistry, engineering, agriculture, medicine, and environmental sciences who have collaborated extensively with Chinese partners.

== See also ==
- State Science and Technology Prizes
- Science and technology in China
