= Chen-Lu Tsou =

Chinese biochemist (1923–2006)

- 邹承鲁
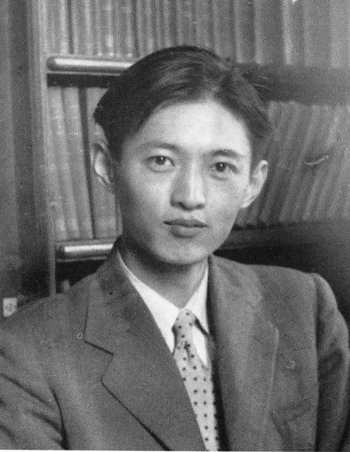
- Tsou in the 1940s
- Born: 17 May 1923; Qingdao, Shandong, Republic of China
- Died: 23 November 2006 (aged 83); Beijing, People's Republic of China
- Education: National Southwestern Associated University; University of Cambridge
- Known for: Tsou plot
- Spouse: Li Lin (Anna Tsou) (m. 1948–2003)
- Awards: TWAS Prize (1992); State Natural Science Award (First Class three times and Second Class three times)
- Scientific career
- Fields: Biochemistry
- Workplaces: Shanghai Institute of Biochemistry; Institute of Biophysics, Chinese Academy of Sciences
- Doctoral advisor: David Keilin

Chinese name
- Traditional Chinese: 鄒承魯
- Simplified Chinese: 邹承鲁
Transcriptions
Standard Mandarin
- Hanyu Pinyin: Zōu Chénglǔ
- Wade–Giles: Tsou Ch'eng-lu

Zou Chenglu (Chinese: 邹承鲁; 17 May 1923 – 23 November 2006), better known as Chen-Lu Tsou, was a Chinese biochemist. He was a professor of the Shanghai Institute of Biochemistry and later a professor and deputy director of the Institute of Biophysics, Chinese Academy of Sciences (CAS). He made important contributions to the synthesis of insulin, and was elected an academician of the CAS and The World Academy of Sciences (TWAS). He won the TWAS Prize in Biology in 1992 for his pioneering study of enzyme inhibition kinetics, and was a six-time laureate of the State Natural Science Award (three times each for First Class and Second Class). His wife, physicist Li Lin, was also an academician of the CAS.

Tsou was a strong advocate against academic fraud and pseudoscience, and led a public campaign against what he called "unhealthy practices" such as administrators' interference in scientific research.

== Early life and education ==
Tsou was born on 17 May 1923 in Qingdao, Shandong province, with his ancestral home in Wuxi, Jiangsu. During the Second Sino-Japanese War, he sought refuge in Kunming in China's interior and studied chemistry at the National Southwestern Associated University. After graduation in 1945, he briefly served in the army during World War II.

After the war, Tsou was awarded a government scholarship to study in England, initially bound for the University of Birmingham. On the recommendation of Wang Yinglai, he was accepted by the University of Cambridge to study under David Keilin at the Molteno Institute for Research in Parasitology.

== Career ==
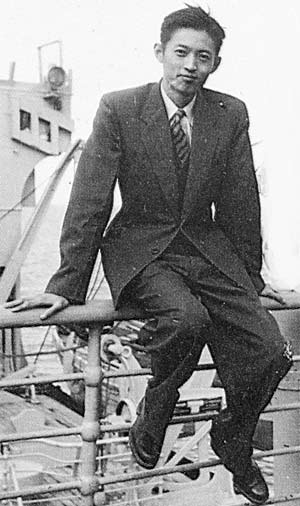
Tsou aboard a ship to England, August 1947

Tsou's doctoral thesis was on the properties of the haemprotein cytochrome c. According to Edward Slater, the research was the first step towards the eventual discovery of protein's structure. After he and his wife both acquired their Ph.D. degrees in 1951, they returned to the newly established People's Republic of China and Tsou became a research professor at the Shanghai Institute of Physiology and Biochemistry where Wang Yinglai served as a deputy director.

After 1958, Tsou was a member of the team at the Shanghai Institute of Biochemistry that first achieved the total chemical synthesis of insulin in 1965. His major contribution to the project was to form the disulphide bridges by joining two synthetic polypeptides using oxidation. His method for estimating the number of essential amino acid residues in an enzyme by chemical modification, in which the remaining activity is plotted against the number of residues modified is known as the Tsou plot. In 1981, he was awarded the State Natural Science Award, First Class, for this achievement.

In 1970, Tsou moved to Beijing to help look after his ailing father-in-law Li Siguang, and transferred to the Institute of Biophysics, Chinese Academy of Sciences. It was in the midst of the Cultural Revolution, when scientific activity was frozen in the anti-intellectual political atmosphere. When American biochemist Emil L. Smith, a fellow alumnus of the Molteno Institute, visited Tsou following Richard Nixon's 1972 visit to China, Tsou used reagent bottles filled with water to maintain a pretence of scientific research.

=== Awards and honors ===
After the end of the Cultural Revolution, Tsou was able to resume his research and was elected as an academician of the Chinese Academy of Sciences in 1980. He pioneered the study of enzyme inhibition kinetics, for which he was awarded the TWAS Prize in Biology in 1992. Despite losing an entire decade of his prime, he published at least 118 papers, mostly in international journals. In 1990, his autobiography was published in Comprehensive Biochemistry Volume 27. By the end of his career, he won the State Natural Science Award First Class three times and Second Class three times. Asteroid 325812 Zouchenglu, discovered by astronomers with the PMO NEO Survey Program at the Purple Mountain Observatory in 2008, was named in his memory. The official naming citation was published by the Minor Planet Center on 9 January 2020 (M.P.C. 120070).

=== Activism ===
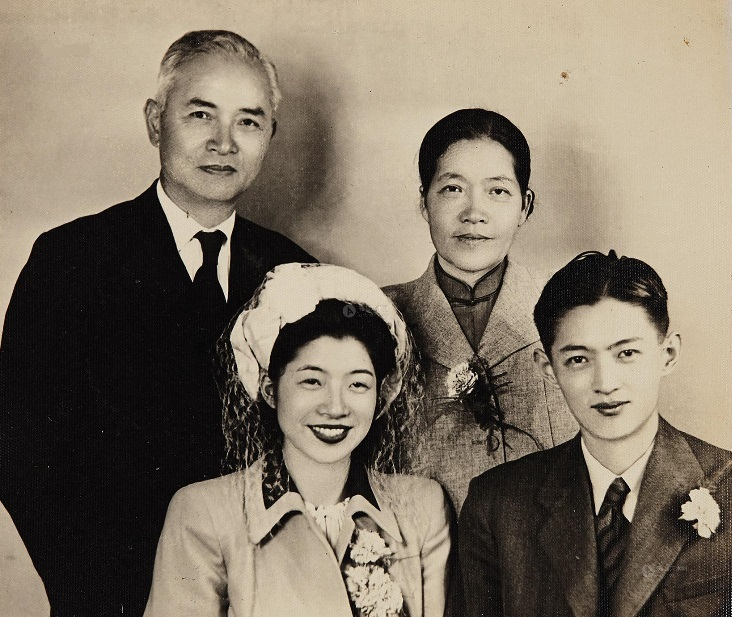
Tsou and Li at their wedding, with Li's parents Li Siguang and Xu Shulin

Tsou was a strong advocate against academic fraud and pseudoscience, and led a public campaign against what he called "unhealthy practices" such as administrators' interference in scientific research. At the Institute of Biophysics, Tsou raised objections to Director Bei Shizhang's display of his achievement in cell formation. The criticism poisoned his relationship with Bei, making Tsou feel "uneasy" at the institute. Scientist Rao Yi later raised the same objections and praised Tsou's probity.

== Personal life ==
In 1948, Tsou married Li Lin (Anna Tsou), a fellow Chinese student at the Department of Metallurgy of Cambridge. Li was the daughter of the renowned geologist Li Siguang, who was in England to preside over their wedding, and she would become a prominent physicist. Tsou later recalled the Cambridge years as the best time for his family. Their daughter, geologist Zou Zongping (邹宗平), was born in the 1950s in China. Li Lin was also elected as an academician of the CAS, making the Li-Tsou family the only one in China that produced three academicians (including Li Siguang).

Despite suffering from cancer in old age, Tsou continued to work until his death. He died in Beijing on 23 November 2006, at the age of 83.
