= Wang Yinglai =

Chinese biochemist (1907–2001)

- 王应睐
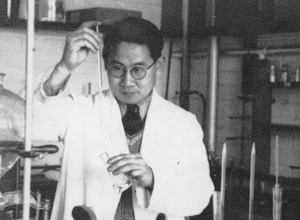
- Wang Yinglai at Cambridge University in 1938
- Born: 13 November 1907; Kinmen, Fujian, Qing China
- Died: 5 May 2001 (aged 93); Shanghai, China
- Education: University of Nanking; University of Cambridge
- Known for: Total chemical synthesis of insulin and tRNA
- Spouse: Liu Runling
- Awards: Special Achievement Award, Miami Winter Symposium (1988); Ho Leung Ho Lee Prize (1996)
- Scientific career
- Fields: Biochemistry
- Workplaces: University of Cambridge; Shanghai Institute of Biochemistry
- Doctoral advisor: David Keilin
- Notable students: Li Zaiping, Xu Genjun, Hong Guofan, Liu Xinyuan, Wang Enduo

Chinese name
- Traditional Chinese: 王應睞
- Simplified Chinese: 王应睐
Transcriptions
Standard Mandarin
- Hanyu Pinyin: Wáng Yīnglài
- Wade–Giles: Wang Ying-lai

Wang Yinglai (simplified Chinese: 王应睐; traditional Chinese: 王應睞; Pe̍h-ōe-jī: Ông Eng-lāi; 13 November 1907 – 5 May 2001), also known as Ying-Lai Wang, was a Chinese biochemist recognized as the first person to create synthetic insulin, a major scientific breakthrough that produced a biologically active compound from inorganic chemicals. He was one of the first group of scientists elected to the Chinese Academy of Sciences in 1955. He founded the Shanghai Institute of Biochemistry in 1958 and served as its director until his retirement in 1984.

== Early life and education ==
Wang was born in Kinmen County (Quemoy), Fujian Province on 13 November 1907, in the final years of the Qing dynasty. He became an orphan at the age of six when his mother died. His father, an Overseas Chinese merchant, had died four years before. Despite the adverse circumstances, he pursued an education throughout the 1920s and 1930s, when China was mired in wars and turmoil. He graduated from the Department of Chemistry of the University of Nanking (Jinling University) and was admitted to the graduate school of the University of Cambridge in 1938, where he studied under David Keilin. After obtaining his Ph.D. in 1941, Wang stayed to teach at Cambridge and conduct research at the Dunn Nutritional Laboratory. He transferred to the Molteno Institute for Research in Parasitology in 1944.

== Career ==
Wang returned to China at the end of World War II despite efforts by Keilin and Joseph Needham to persuade him to stay at Cambridge. Determined to help develop scientific research in China, he accepted a research professorship at the medical school of the National Central University in Nanjing, and later joined the Medical Institute of Academia Sinica in 1948.

After the founding of the People's Republic of China in 1949, Wang became deputy director of the newly established Shanghai Institute of Physiology and Biochemistry, under director Bei Shizhang. In 1955, he was among the first group of scientists to be elected to the newly established Chinese Academy of Sciences. In 1958, he established the Shanghai Institute of Biochemistry and served as its director until his retirement in 1984. In these capacities, he recruited many prominent Chinese scientists from abroad, including future academicians Cao Tianqin, Chen-Lu Tsou (Zou Chenglu), Wang Debao and Niu Jingyi.

Wang's most significant contribution was the total chemical synthesis of insulin. He started the project in 1958 with a team of scientists, who first synthesized the 20 amino acids that constitute proteins, and then used them to produce chains of insulin. His team successfully synthesized insulin in 1965, the first in the world to do so. It was a major breakthrough to produce a biologically active compound from inorganic chemicals.

Many scientists, including the Nobel Prize committee member Arne Tiselius and Physics laureate Chen-Ning Yang, believed Wang's total synthesis of insulin was worthy of a Nobel Prize. However, the Cultural Revolution (1966–1976) intervened and the Chinese Communist government considered the Nobel Prize a symbol of Western decadence. Instead, Wang was held a virtual prisoner in a building at his institute and forced to study Mao Zedong thought. He was unable to conduct research for most of the ten years. During an interview in 1986, Wang told The Straits Times that "we were like the proverbial hare which took a long nap while others were not like the tortoise".

After the end of the Cultural Revolution, Wang and his team resumed their work and achieved the synthesis from inorganic chemicals of a transfer RNA (tRNA), another significant biological molecule, in the late 1970s.

Wang established several training programs for young biochemists, many of whom later became accomplished scientists, including academicians Li Zaiping, Xu Genjun, Hong Guofan, Liu Xinyuan, and Wang Enduo.

=== Awards ===
In 1988, William Joseph Whelan, the founder of the Miami Winter Symposium for Biotechnology, created the Special Achievement Award of the symposium and presented the first award to Wang. In 1996, he was nominated by many scientists for the Ho Leung Ho Lee Prize for Achievement in Science and Technology. When he won the award with its prize money of one million yuan, he used it to fund a scholarship for graduate students at the Chinese Academy of Sciences.

== Personal life ==
Wang met Liu Runling (刘润苓), a student at Yenching University, when he was recuperating from tuberculosis in Beijing. They married and had two sons, Wang Jiahu (王家槲) and Wang Jianan (王家楠). Liu worked as a teacher and started a kindergarten. She suffered from Alzheimer's disease in old age and died in 1992.

Wang died in Shanghai on 5 May 2001, aged 93. Academician Xu Genjun eulogized Wang with a quotation from the Tao Te Ching: "The top class of virtue is like water, which benefits ten thousand objects without any demands for return."

== Selected publications ==
- Adolph, W.H.; Wang, Y.L. (1934). "The Digestibility of Soybean Milk Compared with Cow's Milk in Vitro and in Vivo". Chin. J. Physiol. 8: 171–178.
- Yudkin J., Wang Y.L., "Assessment of the Level of Nutrition, Urinary Excretion of Aneurin at Varying Levels of Intake, Biochem. J., 1940; 34:343–352.
- Harris, L.J.; Wang, Y.L. (1941). "Vitamin Methods 3, An Improved Procedure for Estimating Vitamin B1 in Foodstuffs and Biological Materials by the Throchrome Test including Comparisons with Biological Assays". Biochem. J. 35 (8–9): 1050–1067. doi:10.1042/bj0351050. PMC 1265604. PMID 16747450.
- Harris, L.J.; Mapson, M.L.; Wang, Y.L. (1942). "Vitamin Methods 4A Potentiometric Method for the Estimation of Vitamin C in Coloured Extracts". Biochem. J. 36 (1–2): 183–195. doi:10.1042/bj0360183. PMC 1265673. PMID 16747478.
- Moore, T.; Wang, Y.L. (1945). "Hypervitaminosis A". Biochem. J. 39 (3): 222–228. doi:10.1042/bj0390222. PMC 1258210. PMID 16747891.
- Keilin, D.; Wang, Y.L. (1945). "Haemoglobin from the Root Nodules of Leguminous Plants". Nature. 155: 227–233. doi:10.1038/155227a0. S2CID 4094540.
- Keilin, D.; Wang, Y.L. (1946). "The Haemoglobin of Gastrophilus Larvae Purification and Properties". Biochem. J. 40 (5–6): 855–866. doi:10.1042/bj0400855. PMC 1270050. PMID 16748097.
- Wang; Holliday, E.R.; et al. (1946). "Assay of Crystalline Preparations of Aneurin by Means of the Ultraviolet Absorption Spectrum". Quart. J. Pharm. Pharmacol. 19: 155–172.
- Moore, T.; Wang, Y.L. (1943). "The Fluorescence of the Tissues in Avitaminosis E". Proc. Biochem. Soc., (Great Britain). 37: 1.; Brit. J. Nutrition 1947, 1:53–64.
- Keilin, D.; Wang, Y.L. (1947). "The Stability of Haemoglobin and of Certain Endoery throcytic Enzymes in Vitro". Biochem. J. 41 (4): 491–500. doi:10.1042/bj0410491. PMC 1258524. PMID 16748201.
- Levenbok, L.; Wang, Y.L. (1948). "Succinic Acid in the Blood of the Larva of Gastro philus Intestinalis". Nature. 162 (4123): 731–732. Bibcode:1948Natur.162..731L. doi:10.1038/162731b0. PMID 18933600. S2CID 4064086.
- Chen, S.M.; Hu, H.C.; Wang, Y.L. (1950). "On the Nature of the "Nicotinic Acid" Formed by Rat Liver Slices in the Presence of Tryptophan". Chin. J. Physiol. 17: 325–334.
- Wang, Y.L. (1950). "The Effect of Bile Acids on Succinoxidase Activity". Chin. J. Physiol. 17: 231–242.
- Wang J.Y., Tsou C.L., Wang Y.L., Studies on Succinic Dehydrogenase Isolation, Purification and Properties, Brussels, 3rd Int. Congress of Biochemistry, 1955 Scientia Sinica, 1956, 5:96–90.
- Wang, J.L.; Tsou, C.L.; Wang, Y.L. (1958). "Studies on Succinic Dehydrogenase II, Further Observations on Properties of the Enzyme". Scientia Sinica. 7 (1): 65–74. PMID 13529046.
- Wang J.Y., Wang Y.L., "Studies on Succinic Dehydrogenase IV, The Effect of Some Chelation Agents on the Reconstitution of Succinic Axidase System, Acta Biochim et Biophys Sin, 1964, 4:222;Scientia Sinica, 1964, 13:1799–1809.
- Qi D.F., Wang Y.L., "Studies on Succinic Dehydrogenase V, The Linking between the Flavin Prosthetic Group and the Apoenzyme, Acta Biochim et Biophys Sin, 1964,4: 598; Scientia Sinica, 1965; 14:1193–1204.
- Wang, Y.L. (1966). "Studies on Succinic Dehydrogenase, Purification, Properties and Linking between the Apoenzyme and the Prosthetic Group". Revue Roumaine de Biochemie. 3: 149–153.
- Hsia C.C., Qi D.F., Wang Y.L., "Studies on Aldolase I, The Protective Action of Substrates on the Action of Trypsin on Aldolase, Acta Biochim et Biophys Sin, 1966,6:70, in Chinese; Kexue Tong Bao 1966, 17:216, in English.
- Lin S.X., Shi J.P., Cheng X.D., Wang Y.L., Arginyl tRNA Synthetase from Escherichia Coli, Purification by Affinity Chromatography, Properties and Steady Stat e Kinetics, Biochemistry 1988, 27:6343.
- Lin S.X., Wang Q., Wang Y.L., Interactions between Escherichia Coliarginyl tRNA Sythetase and Its Substrates, Biochemistry, 1988, 27:6348.
