= Guofan =

Guofan may refer to:

== People ==
- Zeng Guofan (Chinese: 曾国藩), Chinese statesman
- Hong Guofan (Chinese: 洪国藩), Chinese molecular biologist
- Liu Guofan (Chinese: 刘国范), Chinese politician
- Zhang Guofan (Chinese: 张国藩), Chinese physicist
- Zhao Guofan, Chinese structural engineer

== Other ==
- Guofan Road station (Chinese: 国帆路), in Yangpu District, Shanghai, China
- Xia Nanyang, aka "Guofan" (Chinese: 过番), a century-long large-scale migration of Chinese people to Southeast Asia
