= Institute of Biophysics =

Institute of Biophysics may refer to:

- Max Planck Institute of Biophysics, Germany
- Institute of Biophysics, Chinese Academy of Sciences
