= Li Lin (physicist) =

Chinese physicist (1923–2003)

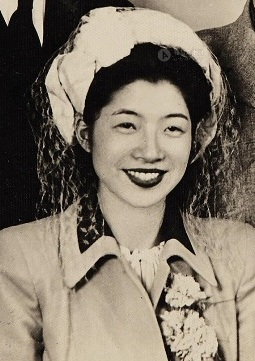
- Li Lin in 1948
- Born: Li Xizhi; 31 October 1923; Beijing, China
- Died: 31 May 2003 (aged 79); Beijing, China
- Education: Guangxi University; University of Birmingham; University of Cambridge
- Spouse: Chen-Lu Tsou (m. 1948)
- Awards: State Science and Technology Progress Award (First Class), 1992
- Scientific career
- Fields: Metallurgy, nuclear power, high-temperature superconductivity
- Workplaces: Shanghai Institute of Metallurgy; Institute of Physics, CAS; Institute of High Energy Physics

Chinese name
- Chinese: 李林
Transcriptions
Standard Mandarin
- Hanyu Pinyin: Lǐ Lín
- Wade–Giles: Li Lin

Li Lin (Chinese: 李林; 31 October 1923 – 31 May 2003) was a Chinese physicist. She made important contributions to China's metallurgy, nuclear power, and high-temperature superconductivity programs, and was elected as an academician of the Chinese Academy of Sciences in 1980. Her father Li Siguang and husband Chen-Lu Tsou were also prominent scientists and academicians.

== Early life and education ==
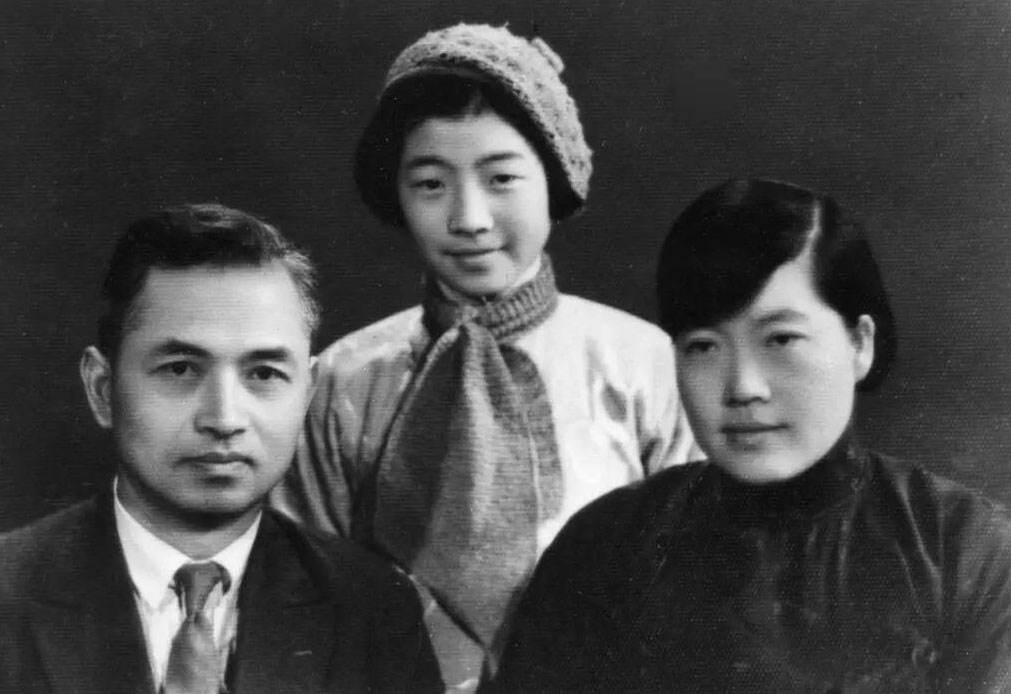
Li Lin with her parents in the 1930s

Li was born Li Xizhi (李熙芝) in Beijing on 31 October 1923, with her ancestral home in Huanggang, Hubei Province. Her father Li Siguang (J. S. Lee) was a renowned geologist and professor at Peking University, and her mother Xu Shubin (许淑彬) was a pianist and schoolteacher. Her father was of Mongol descent, whose grandfather was a Mongolian beggar who migrated to Hubei in search of a better livelihood. Her family originally had the Mongol surname "Kuli" (库里) or "Ku" (库).

From 1934 to 1936, she lived in England where her father was teaching. After the outbreak of the Second Sino-Japanese War in 1937, her family sought refuge in Shanghai and then in Guilin, Guangxi, which was free from Japanese occupation.

In Guilin, she changed her name to Li Lin and attended Guangxi University, graduating in 1944 with a degree in mechanics. She worked at the Aviation Institute in Chengdu, and with the help of Joseph Needham, won a British Cultural Council scholarship to study at the University of Birmingham in 1946. After earning her master's degree in 1948, she continued her studies at the Department of Metallurgy at the University of Cambridge, where she met and married fellow Chinese scientist Chen-Lu Tsou. She became also known as Anna Tsou.

== Career ==
After they both earned their PhDs in 1951, Li and Tsou returned to the newly established People's Republic of China. Li worked for the Shanghai Institute of Metallurgy, and Tsou for the Shanghai Institute of Physiology and Biochemistry, both under the umbrella of the Chinese Academy of Sciences (CAS). She and her colleagues won a prize for their research in spherical graphite in 1956.

In 1956, nuclear physicist Qian Sanqiang recruited Li to work on China's nuclear energy program. After finishing her heavy water reactor project, in 1958 she was transferred to the Institute of Physics of the CAS in Beijing. She spent the next 14 years working on the nuclear program. In 1972 or 1973, she was transferred again to the Institute of High Energy Physics to work on high-temperature superconductivity.

Li was elected as an academician of the Chinese Academy of Sciences in 1980, and won the State Science and Technology Progress Award (First Class) in 1992 for her contribution to the research of superconductivity. She also advised dozens of graduate students and published more than 100 research papers.

== Personal life ==
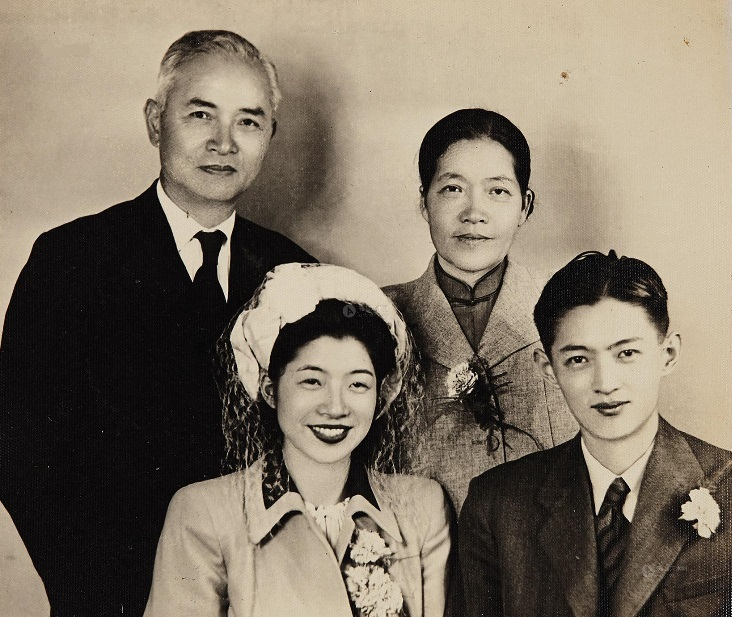
Li and Tsou at their wedding, with her parents Li Siguang and Xu Shulin

Li married Chen-Lu Tsou (Zou Chenglu), a fellow Chinese student at Cambridge, in 1948. Her father Li Siguang was in England to preside over their wedding. Tsou later recalled the Cambridge years as the best time of the family. Their daughter, geologist Zou Zongping (邹宗平), was born in the 1950s in China. Tsou became a prominent biochemist and was also elected an academician of the CAS, making the Li-Tsou family the only one in China that produced three academicians (including Li Siguang).

Li Lin died on 31 May 2003, at the age of 79.
