= Microgate Technology =

Chinese electronic components manufacturer

Shenzhen Microgate Technology Co., Ltd.
- Type: Public
- Traded as: SZSE: 300319
- Industry: Electronics manufacturing
- Founded: 14 March 2001 (25 years ago)
- Headquarters: Shenzhen, China
- Products: Magnetic components, radio frequency (RF) components, optical devices

Shenzhen Microgate Technology Co., Ltd. (SZSE: 300319), known as Microgate Technology is a material and device design as well manufacturing integrated magnetic device and RF component IDM company, headquartered in Shenzhen. The company primarily engages in the R&D, and design of electronic component materials and devices. Its portfolio ranges from magnetic components, radio frequency (RF) components, to optical devices. Microgate was listed on the ChiNext board of the Shenzhen Stock Exchange on May 23, 2012.

== History ==
Microgate Technology was founded on Mar. 14, 2001, initially focusing on low-temperature co-fired ceramics (LTCC) and chip components. In Oct. 2007, it was overall restructured into a joint-stock company. Then, listed on the ChiNext board of Shenzhen Stock Exchange on May 23, 2012, whose registered capital is USD 887.59 million. Since 2015, the company involved-in soft-magnetic composite alloy materials and amorphous, nanocrystalline magnetic glass research and study, Based on the material base, the large-scale design and production of high-power molded inductors, TLVRs, planar transformers, PFC inductors with an IDM model being manufactured.

In recent years, Microgate has focused its business on high-end AI smartphones, AI-integrated consumer electronics, autonomous driving and Electric Vehicle powertrains, AI data center supply chains, and renewable energy storage. Microgate has launched products including high-computing-power integrated multiphase-inductors and TLVRs as well integrated magnetic-circuit PFC inductors and transformers, Vehicle-grade common-mode chokes, and SST power transformers.

== Research and collaborations ==
In 2024, Microgate established technical partnerships for materials research and process platform design with several famous Chinese universities and research institutes, including Central South University, the Chinese Academy of Sciences (CAS), Xi'an Jiaotong University, and the University of Electronic Science and Technology of China (UESTC).

In August 2025, the company established the “Joint Laboratory for Miniature Drive Joints and Bionic Dexterous Hands” with Guangdong Laboratory of Artificial Intelligence and Digital Economy (Shenzhen), known as Guangming Laboratory, focusing on miniature joint drive technology. In March 2026, the joint laboratory team released two miniature drive joints (M01 and M02) and demonstrated their application in bionic dexterous hands.

== Awards and recognition ==
In 2018, the project "Industrialization Technology of High-Generation Surface Acoustic Wave (SAW) Materials and Filters," in which Microgate Technology participated, was honored with the National Science and Technology Progress Award.
