= Wu Minsheng =

Chinese mechanical engineer (1946–2019)

Wu Minsheng (Chinese: 吴敏生; August 1946 – 7 September 2019) was a Chinese mechanical engineer. He served as Dean of Tsinghua University and President of Fuzhou University (2002–2010).

== Biography ==
Wu Minsheng was born in August 1946 into a farming and fishing family in Pingtan County, Fujian, Republic of China. He entered the Department of Mechanical Engineering of Tsinghua University in 1965, and became a faculty member after graduating in 1970. He later studied in Germany and earned a Doctor of Engineering degree from RWTH Aachen University.

Wu was a pioneer in weld seam tracking technology in China. He published more than 100 research papers and several monographs. He taught for nearly fifty years, and was appointed Dean of Tsinghua University in 1993. He later served as Vice President of Tsinghua Graduate School and the first President of Tsinghua's Shenzhen graduate school.

In August 2002, Wu was appointed President of Fuzhou University. During his tenure of almost eight years, he worked to raise funds and enhance the prestige of the university. Under his leadership, the university's research funding multiplied from less than 20 million yuan in 2002 to more than 100 million by 2007. He retired from the position in May 2010.

Wu died in Fuzhou on September 7, 2019, at age 73.
