= Liu Xinyuan =

Chinese molecular biologist (born 1927)

- Born: November 1927 (age 98); Hunan, China
- Education: Nankai University; Shanghai Institute of Biochemistry
- Known for: Cancer-Targeting Gene-Viro-Therapy
- Awards: Ho Leung Ho Lee Prize
- Scientific career
- Fields: Molecular biology
- Workplaces: Shanghai Institute of Biochemistry and Cell Biology; Zhejiang Sci-Tech University

Chinese name
- Traditional Chinese: 劉新垣
- Simplified Chinese: 刘新垣
Transcriptions
Standard Mandarin
- Hanyu Pinyin: Liú Xīnyuán

Liu Xinyuan (Chinese: 刘新垣; born November 1927), or Xin-Yuan Liu, is a Chinese molecular biologist. He is a professor of the Shanghai Institute of Biochemistry and Cell Biology and the founding director of the Xinyuan Institute of Medicine and Biotechnology at Zhejiang Sci-Tech University. His research is focussed on cancer, super interferon therapy, and gene therapy. He is an academician of the Chinese Academy of Sciences, the National Academy of Sciences of Ukraine, and The World Academy of Sciences. He has won more than 30 awards including the Ho Leung Ho Lee Prize.

== Early life and education ==
Liu was born in November 1927 in Hunan Province. After graduating from the Department of Chemistry of Nankai University in 1952, he taught at Hebei Medical University. He was admitted to the Shanghai Institute of Biochemistry in 1957 as an "associate Ph.D." candidate, and stayed at the institute as a research scientist after graduating in 1963.

== Career ==
From 1983 to 1984, Liu worked at the Roche Institute of Molecular Biology in the United States as a visiting scientist. He became a full professor of the Shanghai Institute of Biochemistry and Cell Biology in 1985. In 2004, he was appointed founding director of the Xinyuan Institute of Medicine and Biotechnology at Zhejiang Sci-Tech University.

Liu's research is focussed on cancer, super interferon therapy, and gene therapy. He has conducted projects in areas ranging from the structure-function of RNA, the synthesis of RNA, genetic engineering, signal transduction, gene therapy in Parkinson's disease, and gene therapy of cancer. He has published more than 360 research papers in scientific journals. His collected papers have been published in eleven volumes.

Liu was elected as a member of the Chinese Academy of Sciences in 1991, a foreign member of the National Academy of Sciences of Ukraine in 1992, and a member of The World Academy of Sciences in 2001. He won more than 30 awards and honours, including the Ho Leung Ho Lee Prize for medical sciences and materia media.
