= Xu Genjun =

Chinese biochemist (1935–2008)

Xu Genjun (Chinese: 许根俊; 23 November 1935 – 8 January 2008) was a Chinese biochemist. He was a professor at the Shanghai Institute of Biochemistry and Cell Biology. He was an academician of the Chinese Academy of Sciences and President of the Chinese Society of Biochemistry and Molecular Biology.

== Biography ==
Xu was born in She County, Anhui on 23 November 1935. He graduated from the Chemistry Department of Fudan University in 1957, and joined the Shanghai Institute of Biochemistry afterwards, where he participated in and made significant contributions to the insulin synthesis project led by Wang Yinglai. He later researched enzyme kinetics, chemical modification of proteins, the relationship between proteins' structure and function, and the folding and refolding of proteins.

Xu published more than 100 research papers in academic journals. He was a two-time winner of the State Natural Science Award (first class), in addition to several national prizes by the Chinese Academy of Sciences (CAS). He was also awarded the Ho Leung Ho Lee Prize for Life Sciences. He was elected as an academician of the CAS in 1991.

Xu died on 8 January 2008 at Zhongshan Hospital in Shanghai, at the age of 72.
