= Hong Guofan =

Chinese molecular biologist (born 1938)

Hong Guofan (Chinese: 洪国藩; born December 1938), or Guo-Fan Hong, is a Chinese molecular biologist and professor of the Shanghai Institute of Biochemistry and Cell Biology. He served as Director of the National Center for Gene Research of the Chinese Academy of Sciences (CAS). He is an academician of the CAS and of The World Academy of Sciences.

== Biography ==
Hong was born in December 1938 in Ningbo, Zhejiang Province. He graduated from Fudan University in Shanghai in 1964 and worked at the Shanghai Institute of Biochemistry afterwards. On the recommendations of professors Wang Yinglai and Wang Debao, Hong became a research fellow under Nobel laureate Frederick Sanger at Cambridge University's Laboratory of Molecular Biology in 1979. He returned to China after Sanger's retirement in 1983. In 1990, Hong requested Sanger's assistance in creating a Chinese Sequencing Unit to contribute to Human Genome Project. Sanger contacted James Watson endorsing Hong's expertise. However, Watson rebuffed the offer due to the treatment of Chinese students in the 1989 Tiananmen Square Massacre. Hong was elected as an academician of the Chinese Academy of Sciences in 1997.

Hong's research is focused on DNA and genome science. He designed the "rapid and accurate BAC-fingerprinting-anchoring strategy", which facilitated the BAC-config mapping of the rice genome. For his contributions he was awarded the Ho Leung Ho Lee Prize in life sciences.
