= Zhang Yaoxue =

Chinese computer scientist

- 张尧学

President of Central South University
- In office October 2011 – May 2017
- Preceded by: Huang Boyun
- Succeeded by: Tian Hongqi

Personal details
- Born: January 1956 (age 70) Li County, Hunan, China
- Party: Chinese Communist Party (1987–2026; expelled)
- Education: Xidian University; Tohoku University
- Scientific career
- Workplaces: Tsinghua University; Ministry of Education; Central South University

Chinese name
- Simplified Chinese: 张尧学
- Traditional Chinese: 張堯學
Transcriptions
Standard Mandarin
- Hanyu Pinyin: Zhaāng Yáoxué

Zhang Yaoxue (Chinese: 张尧学; born January 1956) is a Chinese computer engineer, university administrator and politician who was president of Central South University from 2011 to 2017, and an academician of the Chinese Academy of Engineering. He was a member of the 12th National Committee of the Chinese People's Political Consultative Conference.

== Biography ==
Zhang was born in Li County, Hunan, in January 1956. After the Cultural Revolution, he was a surveyor at the Zhiyatai Hydropower Station in his home-county. After resuming the college entrance examination, in 1978, he enrolled at Xidian University, where he majored in the Department of Electronic Engineering. In February 1983, he entered the Japanese language training program at Dalian Foreign Languages Institute, and seven months later, he was accepted to Tohoku University in Japan and obtained a doctoral degree. He joined the Chinese Communist Party (CCP) in April 1987.

Zhang returned to China in March 1990 and began teaching and researching at Tsinghua University. Between July 1995 and October 1995, he was a visiting scholar at the Massachusetts Institute of Technology in the United States. After returning to China, he was appointed deputy director of the Computer Department of the Ministry of Electronics and deputy director of the National Electronic Information System Promotion Office. In November 1997, he continued to teach at the Tsinghua University. In June 1999, he became deputy director of the Science and Technology Department of the Ministry of Education, rising to director in June 2000. He was director of the Higher Education Department of the Ministry of Education in May 2001, in addition to serving as president of Central Radio and Television University (now Open University of China) and deputy director of the Overall Planning Department of the Beijing Organizing Committee for the Olympic Games. In June 2009, he was made director of the Office of the Academic Degrees Committee of the State Council, concurrently serving as director of the Department of Degree Management and Graduate Education of the Ministry of Education. In October 2011, he was chosen as president of Central South University, a position at vice-ministerial level, and held that office until May 2017.

== Investigation ==
On 17 October 2025, Zhang was put under investigation for alleged "serious violations of discipline and laws" by the Central Commission for Discipline Inspection (CCDI), the party's internal disciplinary body, and the National Supervisory Commission, the highest anti-corruption agency of China. Zhang was expelled from the party on 21 May 2026.

== Contributions ==
His most significant research contributions include:

- China's First Network Router: In 1995, he led the team that successfully developed China's first network router, a core device for internet connectivity, and promoted its industrialization.
- Transparent Computing: he pioneered research in the area, proposing a theory that expands the von Neumann architecture by separating information storage, computation, and management. This work is considered an original academic achievement that "preceded and included cloud computing".
- "Zhang's Method": In fundamental network theory, he proposed an interactive protocol synthesis method, referred to as "Zhang's Method" by American peers.

== Honours and awards ==
- 1998 National Science and Technology Progress Award (Second Class)
- 2001 National Science and Technology Progress Award (Second Class)
- 2004 National Technological Invention Award (Second Class)
- 2005 Science and Technology Progress Award of the Ho Leung Ho Lee Foundation
- 2007 Member of the Chinese Academy of Engineering (CAE)
- 2015 State Natural Science Award (First Class) for his project on network computing models and foundational theory.

Educational offices
Preceded by Huang Boyun	President of Central South University; 2011–2017	Succeeded by Tian Hongqi
