= Fuzhou University =

Provincial public university in Fuzhou, Fujian, China

Coordinates: 26°4′36.48″N 119°15′59.51″E

- 福州大学
- Other name: Fúdà (福大)
- Motto: 明德至诚 博学远志
- Motto in English: lit. 'illustrate virtue, complete sincerity; erudition, ambitiousness'
- Type: Public university
- Established: 1958; 68 years ago
- President: Wu Minghong (吴明红)
- Faculty: 3,233 (2023)
- Students: 45,410 (2023)
- Undergraduates: 39,725 (2023)
- Postgraduates: 16,210 (2023)
- Location: Fuzhou, Fujian, China
- Campus: 6.45 km^{2} (2.49 sq mi)
- Website: www.fzu.edu.cn

Chinese name
- Simplified Chinese: 福州大学
- Traditional Chinese: 福州大學
Transcriptions
Standard Mandarin
- Hanyu Pinyin: Fúzhōu Dàxué

Fuzhou University (FZU; 福州大学) is a provincial public university in Fuzhou, Fujian, China. It is affiliated with the Province of Fujian. The university is part of Project 211 and the Double First-Class Construction.

The university has two campuses, split by the Min River. The university's old campus is located on the north bank of the river in the western part of Fuzhou City, while the new campus is located on the edge of the city on the south bank, at the base of Qi Mountain.

== Administration ==
Founded in 1958, Fuzhou University is one of the national key universities that are selected into the "Double First Class University Plan" and former “211 Project”, Chinese government programs to support selected universities for their further rapid development.

Now Fuzhou University covers more than 333 hectares, including several campuses such as Yishan campus, Qishan campus, Tongpan campus and the Xiamen Arts and Design College. The main running campus is located in Qishan campus of the University Town of Fuzhou Region. There are 19 schools in Fuzhou University mainly for undergraduate education and two independently operated colleges—Zhicheng College and Yangguang College. There are 4 post-doctoral research stations, 9 doctoral degree programmes for the first-rank disciplines, 54 doctoral degree programmes for the second-rank disciplines, 29 master's degree programmes for the first-rank disciplines and 168 master's degree programmes for the second-rank disciplines and 11 professional degree authorization stations.

Fuzhou University has been approved by the Ministry of Education to offer undergraduate and postgraduate programmes to students from Hong Kong, Macao, Taiwan regions and foreign countries. At present, there are about 50,000 students in Fuzhou University, including about over 5,200 doctoral and master's degree seekers. Since its establishment, about 200,000 students graduated from Fuzhou University, including full-time doctoral and master's degree students as well as those with the bachelor's degrees and associate degrees.

University rankings

Regional – Overall
- QS Asia: =313 (2025)

Fuzhou University has been taking great efforts to develop the cooperation and exchange. The international and national academic conferences have been conducted successfully in Fuzhou University so that the social academic influence from Fuzhou University has been enhanced. Academic exchanges on science, teaching and culture with Taiwan, Hong Kong and Macao regions have been actively carried out. The university is also positively engaged in promoting the exchanges between Chinese civilization and western civilization. “Library of the Western Belvedere”, the first western works center in China, and Institute of International Sinology have been established. The favorable collaborative relationship has been established with more than 20 universities in different countries, such as the United States, the United Kingdom, Germany, France, Russia, Japan, South Korea and so on. Fuzhou University has become an important window of scientific, academic, educational and cultural exchanges in Fujian Province.

=== Faculties and Schools ===
- Application Technology and Continuing Education Institute
- College of Architecture
- College of Biological Science and Engineering
- College of Chemistry
- College of Civil Engineering
- College of Electrical Engineering and Automation
- College of Engineering and Applied Technology
- College of Environment and Resources
- College of Foreign Languages
- College of Humanities and Social Sciences
- College of Materials Science and Engineering
- College of Mathematics and Computer Science
- College of Mechanical Engineering and Automation
- College of Physics and Information Engineering
- College of Marine
- College of Software
- College of Zijin Mining
- Law School
- School of Chemical Engineering
- School of Economics and Management
- School of Foreign Languages
- School of Marxism
- Xiamen Academy of Arts and Design
- Yango College
- Zhicheng College

== Presidents ==
- Jia Jiumin: 1958–1978
- Huangfu Lin: 1978–1983
- Lu Jiaxi (Honorary President): 1981–2001
- Huang Jinling: 1983–1992
- Qian Kuangwu: 1992–1999
- Wei Kemei: 1999–2002
- Wu Minsheng: 2002–2010
- Fu Xianzhi: May 2010 – December 2023
- Wu Minghong: December 2023 – Present
