= 3844 Lujiaxi =

Main-belt asteroid

Discovery
- Discovered by: Purple Mountain Obs.
- Discovery site: Purple Mountain Obs.
- Discovery date: 30 January 1966

Designations
- Named after: Lu Jiaxi (Chinese chemist)
- Alternative designations: 1966 BZ · 1933 XH; 1964 VC_{1} · 1975 BW; 1977 RW_{3} · 1977 SP; 1980 FY_{10} · 1982 VJ_{9} 1985 HD_{1} · 1985 JV; 1985 KK · 1986 PU; 1986 QA · 1987 YQ
- Minor planet category: main-belt · (middle); Henan

Orbital characteristics
- Epoch 4 September 2017 (JD 2458000.5)
- Uncertainty parameter 0
- Observation arc: 83.47 yr (30,488 days)
- Aphelion: 3.0148 AU
- Perihelion: 2.4484 AU
- Semi-major axis: 2.7316 AU
- Eccentricity: 0.1037
- Orbital period (sidereal): 4.51 yr (1,649 days)
- Mean anomaly: 275.75°
- Mean motion: 0° 13^{m} 5.88^{s} / day
- Inclination: 3.8300°
- Longitude of ascending node: 137.98°
- Argument of perihelion: 230.28°

Physical characteristics
- Dimensions: 13.74±3.48 km 15.538±0.718 km 25.44 km (calculated)
- Synodic rotation period: 10.415 h 13.33±0.01 h
- Geometric albedo: 0.057 (assumed); 0.168±0.032; 0.18±0.07
- Spectral type: SMASS = L L (Bus–DeMeo); C (assumed)
- Absolute magnitude (H): 11.60 · 11.7 · 11.8 · 11.94±0.22

3844 Lujiaxi, provisional designation 1966 BZ, is a Henan asteroid from the central regions of the asteroid belt, approximately 15 kilometers in diameter. It was discovered on 30 January 1966, by astronomers at the Purple Mountain Observatory in Nanjing, China. The asteroid was named after Chinese chemist Lu Jiaxi.

== Orbit and classification ==
Lujiaxi is a member of the Henan family (532), a large asteroid family in the intermediate main-belt, named after 2085 Henan. It orbits the Sun in the central asteroid belt at a distance of 2.4–3.0 AU once every 4 years and 6 months (1,649 days; semi-major axis of 2.73 AU). Its orbit has an eccentricity of 0.10 and an inclination of 4° with respect to the ecliptic.

The body's observation arc begins with its first identification as 1933 XH at Heidelberg Observatory in December 1933, more than 32 years prior to its official discovery observation at Nanjing.

== Physical characteristics ==
In the Bus–DeMeo and SMASS classification, Lujiaxi is an uncommon L-type asteroid, which is also the overall spectral type for members of the Henan family.

=== Rotation period and shape ===
In August 2013, a rotational lightcurve of Lujiaxi was obtained from photometric observations by Italian amateur astronomer Silvano Casulli. Lightcurve analysis gave a rotation period of 10.415 hours (given as 0.43397 days) with a brightness amplitude of 0.43 magnitude (U=n.a.).

In December 2014, a study by an international collaboration of astronomers found a period of 13.33 hours with an amplitude of 0.34 magnitude (U=2+). The study selected Lujiaxi because it is a suspected "Barbarian" asteroid with a potentially slow rotation period. This group is named after 234 Barbara, which polarimetric properties and observed occultations suggest that such bodies have an unusual shape and topographic features with large concave areas.

=== Diameter and albedo ===
According to the survey carried out by the NEOWISE mission of NASA's Wide-field Infrared Survey Explorer, Lujiaxi measures 13.74 and 15.538 kilometers in diameter and its surface has an albedo of 0.18 and 0.168, respectively.

The Collaborative Asteroid Lightcurve Link assumes a standard albedo for carbonaceous asteroids of 0.057 and consequently calculates a much larger diameter of 25.44 kilometers based on an absolute magnitude of 11.7.

== Naming ==
This minor planet was named after Lu Jiaxi (1915–2001), a Chinese physical chemist, who headed the Chinese Academy of Sciences and made important contributions to the structural chemistry of cluster compounds. The official naming citation was published by the Minor Planet Center on 11 February 1998 (M.P.C. 31188).
