= State Science and Technology Prizes =

Chinese award

- Traditional Chinese: 國家科學技術獎励
- Simplified Chinese: 国家科学技术奖励
Transcriptions
Standard Mandarin
- Hanyu Pinyin: guójiā kēxué jìshù jiǎnglì
Yue: Cantonese
- Jyutping: gwok3 gaa1 fo1 hok6 gei6 seot6 zoeng2 lai6

The State Science and Technology Prizes (Chinese: 国家科学技术奖励) are the highest honors conferred by the national government of the People's Republic of China in science and technology, in order to recognize citizens and organizations who have made remarkable contributions to scientific and technological progress, and to promote the development of science and technology. The State Council enacted the Regulations on the State Science and Technology Prizes and established five State prizes in science and technology:

- Highest Science and Technology Award (simplified Chinese: 国家最高科学技术奖; traditional Chinese: 國家最高科學技術獎) (established in 2000);
- State Natural Science Award (simplified Chinese: 国家自然科学奖; traditional Chinese: 國家自然科學獎);
- State Technological Invention Award (simplified Chinese: 国家技术发明奖; traditional Chinese: 國家技術發明獎);
- State Science and Technology Progress Award (China) (simplified Chinese: 国家科学技术进步奖; traditional Chinese: 國家科學技術進步獎);
- China International Science and Technology Cooperation Award (simplified Chinese: 中华人民共和国国际科学技术合作奖; traditional Chinese: 中華人民共和國國際科學技術合作獎)

The State Natural Science Award, the State Technological Invention Award and the State Science and Technology Progress Award are classified into two grades, that is, the First Class Award (simplified Chinese: 一等奖; traditional Chinese: 一等獎) and the Second Class Award (simplified Chinese: 二等奖; traditional Chinese: 二等獎).

The Highest Science and Technology Award is awarded by the President of China, while the State Natural Science Award First Class Award is given in person by the Premier.

== See also ==
- List of general science and technology awards
