= Zhou Guangzhao =

Chinese physicist (1929–2024)

Zhou Guangzhao ForMemRS
- 周光召
- Born: May 15, 1929; Changsha, Hunan, China
- Died: August 17, 2024 (aged 95)
- Education: Tsinghua University; Beijing University
- Occupation: Physicist
- Years active: 1957–2024
- Organization(s): Joint Institute for Nuclear Research; China Academy of Engineering Physics; Chinese Academy of Sciences; Virginia Polytechnic Institute; European Organization for Nuclear Research; US National Academy of Sciences
- Website: royalsociety.org/guangzhao-zhou

Zhou Guangzhao ForMemRS (Chinese: 周光召; pinyin: Zhōu Guāngzhāo; May 15, 1929 – August 17, 2024) was a Chinese theoretical physicist who served as President of the Chinese Academy of Sciences from 1987 to 1997.

== Early life and education ==
Zhou Guangzhao was born on May 15, 1929, in Changsha, the capital of Hunan province. He was the 5th child of the civil engineer Zhou Fengjiu, and the younger brother of biochemist/geneticist Zhou Guangyu. He graduated from Tsinghua University in 1951, and then did graduate work in theoretical physics for three years at Beijing University. He stayed at Beijing Univ. on the faculty after completing his PhD. In 1957 he was sent to the USSR by the Chinese Atomic Energy Research Institute to work at the Dubna Joint Institute for Nuclear Research.

== Professional career ==
Zhou returned to China in 1960, where he worked on the Chinese nuclear weapons program. Zhou joined the Ninth Institute in May 1961 as the director of the theory group.

He ultimately becoming director of the Chinese Nuclear Weapons Research Institute, now the China Academy of Engineering Physics (CAEP).

He was elected to the Chinese Academy of Sciences (CAS) and later became the Vice President (1984–1987) and President (1987–1997) of the CAS.

Zhou's theoretical work focuses on particle physics.

He first visited the US in 1979. In the 1980s he spent time as a visiting researcher at the University of California and Virginia Polytechnic Institute and at the European Organization for Nuclear Research in Switzerland.

== Death ==
Zhou died on August 17, 2024, at the age of 95.

== Honors ==
The asteroid 3462 Zhouguangzhao is named after him.

Zhou was elected to the US National Academy of Sciences in 1987.

Academic offices
Preceded by Lu Jiaxi	President of Chinese Academy of Sciences; 1987–1997	Succeeded by Lu Yongxiang
