= Lu Jiaxi (chemist) =

Chinese chemist and politician (1915–2001)

- 卢嘉锡
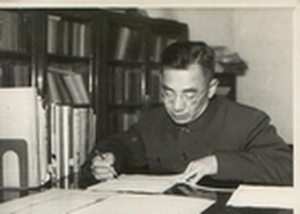
- Lu Jiaxi in the early 1960s

President of the Chinese Academy of Sciences
- In office May 1981 – January 1987
- Preceded by: Fang Yi
- Succeeded by: Zhou Guangzhao

Vice Chairman of the Standing Committee of the National People's Congress
- In office 27 March 1993 – 16 March 1998
- Chairman: Qiao Shi

Vice Chairman of the Chinese People's Political Consultative Conference
- In office 13 March 1998 – 4 June 2001
- Chairman: Li Ruihuan
- In office 10 April 1988 – 27 March 1993
- Chairman: Li Xiannian

Chairman of the Chinese Peasants' and Workers' Democratic Party
- In office November 1988 – November 1997
- Preceded by: Zhou Gucheng
- Succeeded by: Jiang Zhenghua

Personal details
- Born: 26 October 1915 Xiamen, Fujian, China
- Died: June 4, 2001 (aged 85) Fuzhou, Fujian, China
- Party: Chinese Peasants' and Workers' Democratic Party
- Spouse: Wu Xunyu (吴逊玉) (m. 1936)
- Education: California Institute of Technology; University College London; Xiamen University

Lu Jiaxi (Chinese: 卢嘉锡; Pe̍h-ōe-jī: Lô͘ Ka-sek; 26 October 1915 – 4 June 2001), or Chia-Si Lu, was a Chinese physical chemist who is considered a founder of the discipline in China. He served as president of the Chinese Academy of Sciences, founding director of Fujian Institute of Research on the Structure of Matter (FJIRSM), and founding president of Fuzhou University, as well as high-ranking political positions, including chairman of the Chinese Peasants' and Workers' Democratic Party, Vice Chairman of the Chinese People's Political Consultative Conference (CPPCC), and Vice Chairman of the National People's Congress.

== Biography ==
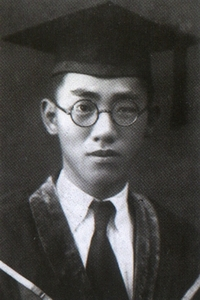
Lu Jiaxi at graduation from Xiamen University (1934)

On 26 October 1915, Lu Jiaxi was born to a scholarly family in Xiamen (Amoy), Fujian, China. A child prodigy, he finished elementary school in a single year, before spending another year and a half in junior high school. Before turning 13, he passed the entrance examination to a preparatory class for Xiamen University. He received the Tan Kah Kee scholarship for four years and graduated from Xiamen University in 1934 with a degree in chemistry. He then taught at the university for three years.

In 1937, Lu passed a competitive examination and received a national postgraduate fellowship to study at University College London, where he studied under Samuel Sugden and obtained a Ph.D. at the age of 24. With the recommendation of Sugden, he was admitted to the California Institute of Technology in 1939, and studied structural chemistry under Linus Pauling, the future Nobel laureate. In 1944, he worked at the Maryland Research Laboratory of the US National Defense Research Committee (NDRC). His research in the area of combustion and explosion earned him an R&D prize from the NDRC.

After the end of World War II, Lu turned down numerous employment opportunities in the United States, and returned to war-torn China in the winter of 1945. He was appointed professor and dean of the Chemistry Department at Xiamen University.

From 1960 to 1981, Lu was director of the Fujian Institute of Research on the Structure of Matter (FJIRSM), and vice president of Fuzhou University. He served as President of the Chinese Academy of Sciences (CAS) from 1981 to 1988, and as a special advisor to the CAS afterwards. He was also Vice President of the Third World Academy of Sciences. His political positions include Chairman of the Chinese Peasants' and Workers' Democratic Party (1988–97, Honorary Chairman afterwards), Vice Chairman of the Chinese People's Political Consultative Conference (1988–93 and 1998–2003), and Vice Chairman of the National People's Congress (1993–98).

Lu Jiaxi died on 4 June 2001. On 6 April 2002, a bronze statue of him was erected in front of the Chemistry Department of Xiamen University.

== Research and honours ==
Lu Jiaxi's research focus was on physical, structural, nuclear, and materials chemistry. He proposed a structural model of the center of nitrogenase, a key enzyme used in biological nitrogen fixation, and studied the relationship between chemical structure and performance. His work is recognized internationally, and he was elected as a member of the European Academy of Sciences and Arts and of the Royal Academies for Science and the Arts of Belgium. For his contributions to structural chemistry, he was awarded the Scientific Achievement Prize by the Ho Leung Ho Lee Foundation. In 1998, the asteroid 3844 Lujiaxi was named in his honour.
