= State Technological Invention Award (China) =

- Native name: 国家技术发明奖 (Guójiā Jìshù Fāmíng Jiǎng)
- Description: Honoring major technological inventions by Chinese citizens
- Country: China
- Presented by: State Council of China
- Website: www.nosta.gov.cn

The State Technological Invention Award (simplified Chinese: 国家技术发明奖; traditional Chinese: 國家技術發明獎; pinyin: Guójiā Jìshù Fāmíng Jiǎng), or "National Award for Technological Invention", is one of the five State Science and Technology Prizes of the People's Republic of China. It is awarded to citizens who have made major technological inventions. The State Technological Invention Award was established by the State Council of China in 1999.

== History ==
In 1999, the State Council of China established the State Science and Technology Prizes framework, the State Technological Invention Award was designated as one of the five national awards, alongside the Highest Science and Technology Award, State Natural Science Award, the State Science and Technology Progress Award and the China International Science and Technology Cooperation Award.

In 2002, the National Office for Science and Technology Awards formally entrusted the Hong Kong Special Administrative Region Government to coordinate nominations for the State Science and Technology Prizes. Since then, the Innovation and Technology Commission of Hong Kong has been responsible for organizing Hong Kong’s submissions for the State Technological Invention Award and the State Science and Technology Progress Award.

In 2019, the prize money was increased: from 200,000RMB to 300,000 RMB per first prize, and from 100,000 to 150,000RMB per second prize.

In 2024 and 2025, China revised its national science and technology award guidelines to align more closely with national strategic priorities, emphasizing frontier science, major national needs, and research integrity. Under the updated system, the State Natural Science Award, the State Technological Invention Awards and the State Science and Technology Progress Award altogether amount to no more than 300 prizes biennially.

Over the years, the national awards have increasingly emphasized indigenous innovation, strategic technologies, and contributions that support China’s long‑term goals of building an innovation‑driven, world‑leading scientific and technological nation.

== Award Criteria ==
The inventions should:

- Not be previously invented or publicly disclosed by others.
- Be advanced, creative, and practical in concept and implementation.
- Be capable of producing significant economic or social benefits after implementation.

== Award Classes ==
The State Technological Invention Award is presented in two classes:

- First Prize (一等奖): For inventions of exceptional originality and national significance.
- Second Prize (二等奖): For inventions demonstrating substantial innovation and application value.

The number of First Prize awards is typically limited.

== See also ==
- State Science and Technology Prizes
- Chinese Academy of Sciences
