= Huang Boyun =

- 黄伯云
- Born: November 24, 1945 (age 80); Nan County, Hunan, China
- Occupation: President of Central South University
- Political party: Chinese Communist Party

Huang Boyun (simplified Chinese: 黄伯云; traditional Chinese: 黃伯雲; pinyin: Huáng Bóyún) is the former President of Central South University, the academician of Chinese Academy of Engineering (CAE) and a member of Chinese Communist Party (CCP) and a representative of the 16th and 17th National Congress of the Chinese Communist Party.
