= Li Siguang =

Chinese geologist and politician (1889–1971)

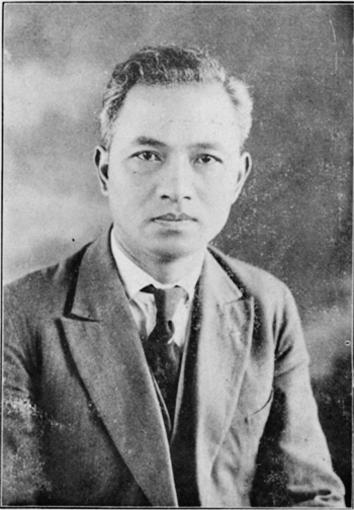
- Born: 26 October 1889; Huanggang, Hubei, Qing China
- Died: 29 April 1971 (aged 81); Beijing, China
- Education: Osaka Technical College; University of Birmingham
- Scientific career
- Workplaces: Peking University

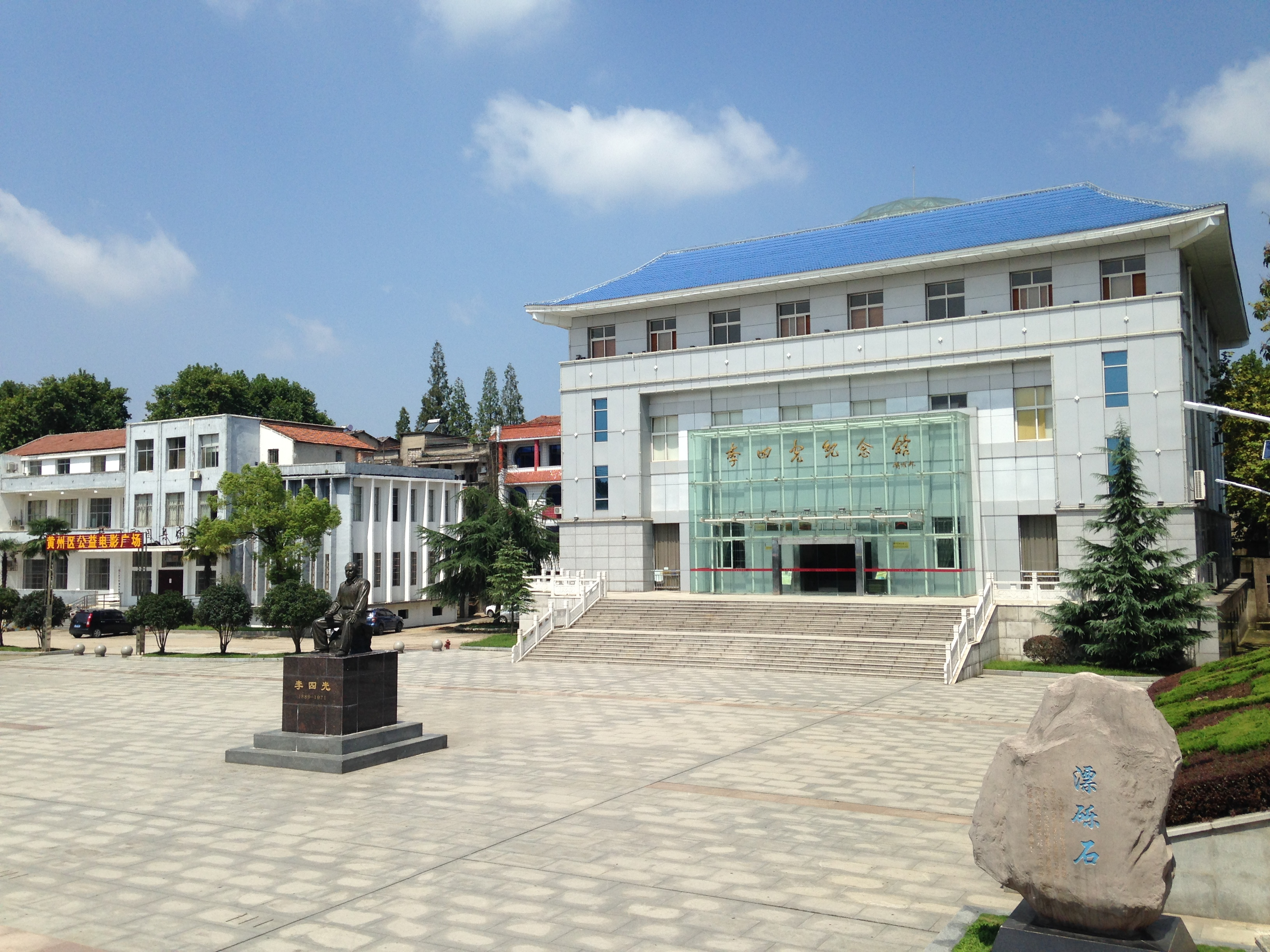
Li Siguang Memorial Museum in Huangzhou, Hubei

Li Siguang (Chinese: 李四光; pinyin: Lǐ Sìguāng; Wade–Giles: Li Ssu-kuang; 26 October 1889 – 29 April 1971), also known as J. S. Lee, was a Chinese geologist and politician. He was the founder of China's geomechanics. He was an ethnic Mongol. He made outstanding contributions, which changed the situation of "oil deficiency" in the country, enabling the large-scale development of oil fields to raise the country to the ranks of the world's major oil producers.

== Biography ==
Li was born as Li Zhongkui (李仲揆) in Huanggang, Hubei Province. His paternal line had descended from a Mongolian official in Yuan Dynasty. His family originally bore the Mongol surname "Kuli" (库里) or "Ku" (库). After the fall of the Yuan Dynasty, he consealed his identity and settled in Hubei.

Li Zhongkui changed his name when he was applying for school at 14 by modifying the characters of his age (十四), and kept his original name as a courtesy name. He was often known in English as J. S. Lee (J for Zhongkui/Jung-kuei, S for Siguang).

Li studied in Osaka Technical College in Japan and the University of Birmingham in UK in his early years. He became a geological professor at Peking University upon his return from abroad in 1920. Li Siguang was Wuhan University building preparatory chairman from July 1928 to April 1938. He was the president of the National Central University (Nanjing University) in 1932.

After the People's Republic of China was established, Li held the positions of vice president of the Chinese Academy of Sciences (CAS) and minister of geology.

After the end of the Cultural Revolution (1966–1976), Xu Chi published Li's biography entitled The Light of Geology (地质之光), which was widely read and made Li a household name in China.

== Family ==
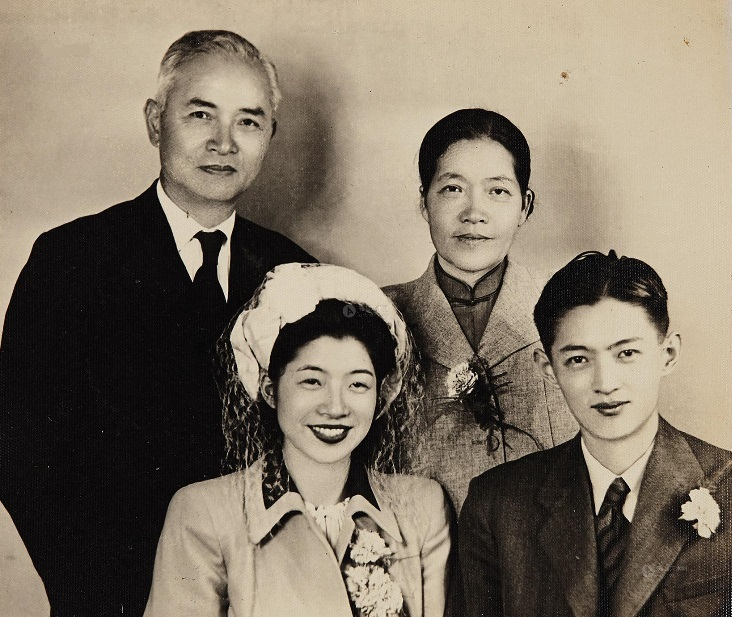
Li Siguang and wife Xu Shubin at the wedding of their daughter Li Lin and son-in-law Chen-Lu Tsou

Li Siguang's daughter Li Lin was a physicist and academician of the CAS. She married Chen-Lu Tsou (Zou Chenglu), a distinguished biochemist and academician, while they were both attending the University of Cambridge in England. Li's family is thus the only one in China that has produced three academicians. Li Lin's daughter, Zou Zongping (邹宗平), followed her grandfather's footsteps and became a geologist.
