= Bei Shizhang =

Chinese biologist (1903–2009)

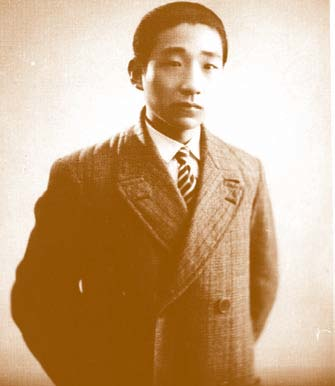
- Bei in 1930
- Born: October 10, 1903; Zhenhai, Zhejiang, China
- Died: October 29, 2009 (aged 106); Beijing, China
- Education: University of Tübingen
- Scientific career
- Fields: Biophysics; Embryology
- Notable students: Yan Xiyun

Bei Shizhang (simplified Chinese: 贝时璋; traditional Chinese: 貝時璋; pinyin: Bèi Shízhāng; Wade–Giles: Pei Shih-chang; October 10, 1903 – October 29, 2009), or Shi-Zhang Bei, was a Chinese biophysicist, embryologist, politician, and writer. He was an academician at the Chinese Academy of Sciences.

He was born in Zhenhai, Zhejiang province, on October 10, 1903. He found the department of biology, Zhejiang University in 1929, and work there for 20 years. He was the oldest member of both the Academia Sinica and the Chinese Academy of Sciences at the time of his death. He was the founder, the first chief director and honorary director of the Institute of Biophysics, Chinese Academy of Sciences.

He was a pioneer of Chinese cytology, embryology and the founder of Chinese biophysics. He was considered the "Father of Chinese Biophysics". The asteroid 31065 Beishizhang was named in his honour on the occasion of his 100th birthday. He obtained his doctorate from University of Tübingen in 1928.

== Death ==
Bei Shizhang died in his home in Beijing on October 29, 2009, aged 106.
