= State Science and Technology Progress Award (China) =

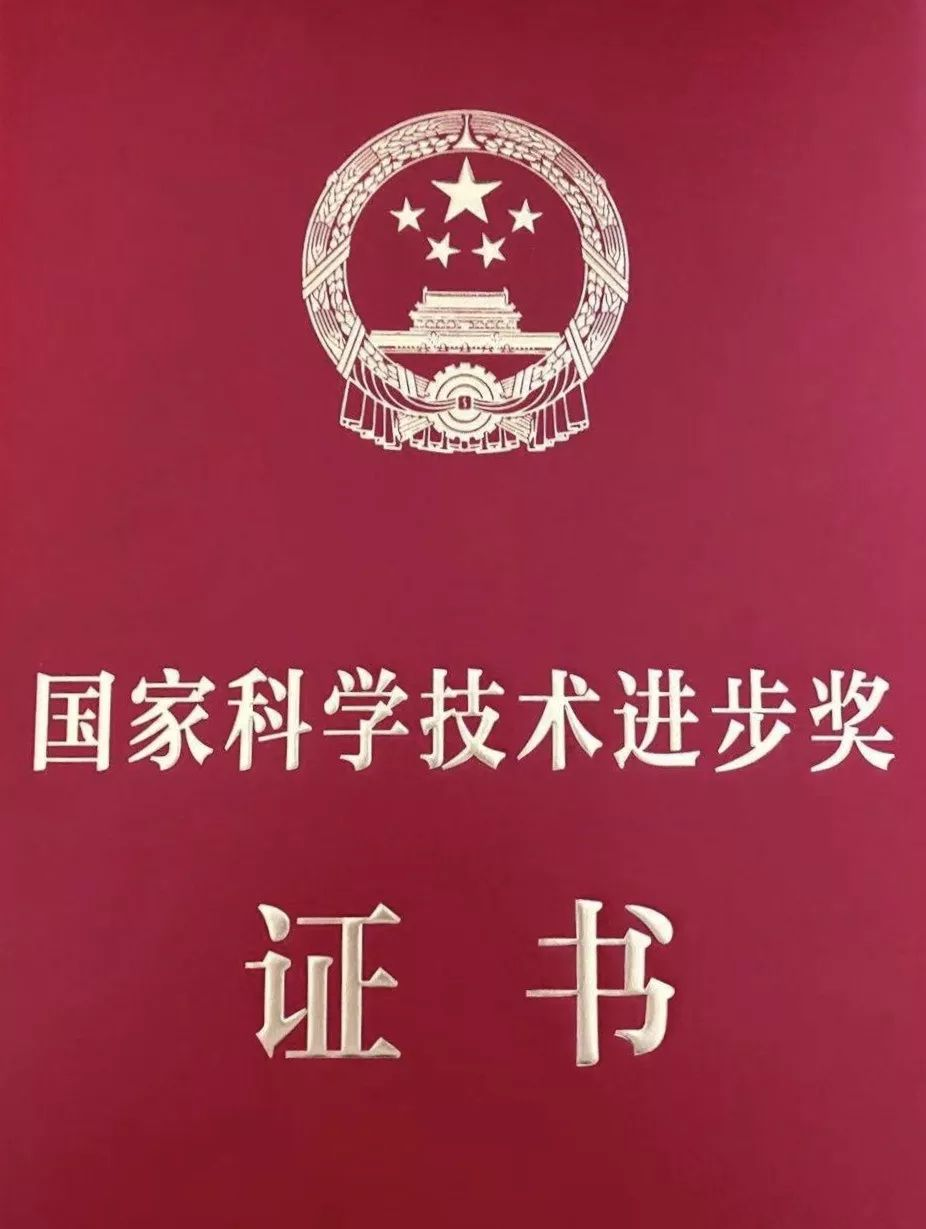
- Country: PRC
- Presented by: State Council of China
- First award: 1985
- Final award: 2025

The State Science and Technology Progress Award (simplified Chinese: 国家科学技术进步奖; traditional Chinese: 國家科學技術進步獎; pinyin: Guójiā Kēxué Jìshù Jìnbù Jiǎng), or "National Science and Technology Progress Award", is one of the State Science and Technology Prizes of the People's Republic of China. Awarded achievements are granted by the State Council of China. The National Science and Technology Progress Award is granted to Chinese citizens and organizations that have completed major scientific and technological projects or have made outstanding contribution in applying and disseminating advanced research results.

== History ==
On September 12, 1984, the State Council promulgated the "Regulations on Science and Technology Progress Awards of the People's Republic of China".

From 1985 to 1999, the National Science and Technology Progress Award included Special Prize, First Prize, Second Prize, and Third Prize.

After the State Council promulgated the "Regulations on National Science and Technology Awards" in 1999, the selection criteria for the National Science and Technology Progress Special Prize became more stringent, and the Special Prize was basically awarded to major national science and technology projects.

From 2000 to 2002, State Science and Technology Progress Award only included First Prize and Second Prize.

Since 2003, it has included Special Prize, First Prize, and Second Prize. Award-winning projects are divided into two categories: general projects and defense-specific projects.

In 2025, China revised its national science and technology award guidelines to align more closely with national strategic priorities, emphasizing frontier science, major national needs, and research integrity. Under the updated system, the State Natural Science Award, the State Technological Invention Award and the State Scientific and Technological Progress Award altogether amounts to no more than 300 prizes biennially.

== Special Prize ==
The following is a list of the projects awarded the Special Prize, the highest of the National Science and Technology Progress Award. (only the projects supported by dedicated wiki pages or reliable sources are included)

Time	Content
1985:	1. Type 091 submarine 2. Chinese submarine Changzheng 6 (Type 092); 3. JL-1; 4. Long March 3; 5. Dongfanghong-1 Satellite; 6. Dong Fang Hong 2 Experimental Communication Satellite and Microwave Measurement and Control System; 7. Yuanwang Space Survey Ship; 8. Xiangyanghong 10 Oceanographic Survey Ship; 9. Type 69-2 Medium Tank; 10. J-8 and J-8-I Aircraft; 11. Nanchang Q-5; 12. Butadiene Rubber; 13. Gezhouba Dam Second and Third River Projects and its Hydropower Units; 14. Chengdu–Kunming railway 15. Nanjing Yangtze River Bridge Bridge Construction Technology; 16. Daqing Oil Field Long-term high-yield and stable water injection development technology
1987:	1. HJ-8 anti-tank missile weapon system
1988:	1. YJ-8 anti-ship missile
1990:	1. Beijing Electron–Positron Collider II; 2. Recoverable photographic positioning satellite (Jianbing-1A)
1996:	1. Daqing Oil Field High Water Cut Period "Stable Oil and Water Control" System Engineering
1997:	1. Qinshan Nuclear Power Plant Design and construction of the Qinshan Nuclear Power Plant (Qinshan 300,000 kW nuclear power plant)
1998:	1. Long March 3A and Long March 3B carrier rockets
1999:	1. Xi'an JH-7 fighter-bomber
2003:	1. China Manned Space Program
2004:	1. Dongfeng-31 Surface-to-Surface Missile Weapon System
2006:	1. Chengdu J-10 Aircraft Project
2007:	1. HQ9 air defense + anti-satellite surface-to-air missile weapon system
2008:	1. Qinghai-Tibet Railway Project
2009:	1. China Lunar Exploration Project; 2. Type 039 submarine
2010:	1. Shaanxi KJ-2000 early warning and command aircraft
2012:	1. Chang'e 2 project
2013:	1. Research and application of two-line Hybrid rice technology
2014:	1. High-performance computer system of Tianhe-1
2015	1. Beijing–Shanghai high-speed railway
2016:	1. Key Technologies and Applications of the 4th Generation of Mobile Communications (LTE (telecommunication)); 2. Beidou-2 satellite project (BeiDou)
2018:	1. Development of underwater-launched solid-propellant rocket system (Possibly Julang-2)
2019:	1. Three Gorges Dam Project
2020:	1. Chang'e-4 Project
2023:	1. Fuxing High-Speed Train

== See also ==
- State Science and Technology Prizes
- Chinese Academy of Sciences
