= Shanghai Institutes for Biological Sciences =

Chinese research institute

The Shanghai Institutes for Biological Sciences were research institutes of the Chinese Academy of Sciences in Shanghai established on July 3, 1999. The organization was shut down in April 2020. When it was created, it was one of four basic science research institutions of China. (Note: translated by Xinhua as Shanghai Life Science Research Center and Shanghai Academy of Life Sciences; the other institutes were Beijing Mathematics Research Center, Beijing Materials Science Research Center, and the State Astronomical Research Center) The organization assimilated the Shanghai Institute of Biochemistry, Shanghai Institute of Cell Biology, Shanghai Institute of Materia Medica, Shanghai Institute of Physiology, Shanghai Brain Research Institute, Shanghai Institute of Plant Physiology, Shanghai Institute of Entomology, Shanghai Bioengineering Research Center, Shanghai Research Center of Life Science, and the State Research Center of Genes. Its last director was biochemist Li Lin, who assumed the role in 2013.
