= Touching China Annual Person of the Year Award =

The Touching China Annual Person of the Year Award (Chinese: 感动中国年度人物评选; abbreviated as Touching China or Touching China Awards) is a selection event launched by the News Center of China Media Group (CMG). It focuses on recognizing influential individuals in China. With the slogan "Touching the Public, Touching China (感动公众，感动中国)", the award is held annually, typically selecting ten individuals and one group each year.

== Criteria and selection process ==
=== Selection criteria ===
The Touching China Annual Person of the Year Award recognizes individuals or groups who have made significant contributions to society. Candidates must meet at least one of the following criteria:

- Their actions or events must have taken place within the award year or gained widespread public attention during that period.
- They have made outstanding contributions to social progress and modern development, received major honors, and gained significant public recognition.
- They have demonstrated remarkable achievements in their respective fields or have played a key role in national-level projects.
- They have shown exceptional dedication to their work, accomplishing extraordinary feats in ordinary positions.
- They have made outstanding contributions to social justice, human survival, or environmental protection.
- Their personal experiences or actions reflect social values, development trends, and the spirit of the times.
- Their personal stories in life, family, or emotions are particularly moving, embodying traditional Chinese virtues and positive social values.

==== Selection process ====
The selection follows a multi-step process:

- A Recommendation Committee nominates candidates, providing written justifications and background materials on their achievements.
- The Organizing Committee collects additional candidate profiles, which serve as reference materials for the Recommendation Committee.
- The Recommendation Committee votes on the nominees, selecting candidates based on their impact and significance.
- The final selection of the Top 10 individuals (or groups) is determined through public voting and final evaluations by the organizing committee.

== Judging panel ==
=== 2008 ===
Yu Dan, Wang Xiaohui, Wang Zhenyao, Shui Junyi, Bai Yansong, Feng Jicai, Liu Hanjun, Liu Shuwei, Ji Baocheng, Sun Bingchuan, Sun Wei, Ren Weixin, Zhuang Dianjun, Zhu Yu, Du Yubo, Gu Yunlong, Luo Ming, Yi Zhongtian, A Lai, Zhang Ruimin, Lu Xiaohua, Chen Xiaochuan,Chen Zhangliang, Chen Huai, Chen Tong, Chen Xitian, Jin Yong, Zhao Huayong, Zhong Nanshan, Qin Shaode, Jia Pingwa, Tu Guangjin, Yan Su, Liang Xiaotao, Liang Jianzeng, Zhang Qiyue, Cui Yongyuan, Peng Changcheng, Jing Yidan, Yu Guoming, Xie Guoming, Pu Cunxin.

=== 2013 ===
Yu Dan, Wang Zhenyao, Wang Xiaohui, Bai Yansong, Feng Jicai, Liu Beixian, Liu Shuwei, Sun Yusheng, Sun Wei, Du Yubo, Li Xiaolin, Shi Wenchao, Wu Mengchao, He Dongping, Yu Qiuyu, Zhang Huijun, Zhang Ruimin, Lu Xiaohua, A lai, Chen Xiaochuan, Chen Tong, Chen Yulu, Chen Juhong, Ming Lizhi, Luo Ming, Jin Yong, Zhao Wei, Hu Zhanfan, Huang Chuanfang, Huang Hong, Yan Su, Liang Jianzeng, Peng Changcheng, Jing Yidan, Tong Nian, Dai Zigeng.

== List of previous winners ==
=== 2002 ===
Zheng Peimin, Zhang Rongsuo, Wang Xuan, Liu Shuwei, Zhang Ruimin, Zhang Qiandong, Huang Kun, Yao Ming, Zhao Xinmin, Pu Cunxin

- Special Award: Three Gorges Immigration

=== 2003 ===
Yang Liwei, Zhong Nanshan, Chen Zhonghe, Wei Shan Hong, Liang Yulun, Ba Jin, Gao Yaojie, Dawut Asimu, Jackie Chan

- Special Award: 2003 Hengyang fire firefighters (List of People's Armed Police personnel killed in the line of duty#2000s)

=== 2004 ===
Niu Yuru, Liang Wanjun, Liu Xiang, Ming Zhengbin, Ren Changxia, Sun Bigan, Tian Shiguo, Xu Benyu, Yuan Longping, GUI Xien

- Special Award: China women's national volleyball team

=== 2005 ===
Cong Fei, Wei Qinggang, Huang Boyun, Li Chunyan, Hong Zhanhui, Chen Jian, Tai Lihua, Yang Yegong, Wang Shunyou, Fei Junlong, Nie Haisheng

- Special Award: Qinghai-Tibet Railway Builders

=== 2006 ===
Ding Xiaobing, Hua Yiwei, Ye Duzheng, Wang Minjun, Ji Xianlin, Kong Xiangrui, Huang Ge, Huo Yingdong, Lin Xiuzhen, Qingdao love group Micro dust.

- Special Award: Chinese Workers' and Peasants' Red Army

=== 2007 ===
Qian Xuesen, Li Jianying, Zhong Zhirong, Henry Hu and his wife, Meng Xiangbin, Fang Yonggang, Li Li, Min Enze, Chen Xiaolan, Xie Yanxin, Luo Yingzhen

- Special Award: "Chang'e-1" Satellite Development Team

=== 2008 ===
Tangshan thirteen farmers, Wu Wenbin, Zhang Yimou Olympic director team, Jin Jing, Ji Ji, "Shenzhou VII" astronaut team, Li Guilin and Lu Jianfeng couple, Han Huimin, Jing Dazhong, Li Long

- Special Award: All "Chinese"

=== 2009 ===
Zhuo Lin, Soong Wencong, Aripa Alimahon, Sabriye Tenberken, Zhang Zhengxiang, Chen Yu-rong, Zhu Bangyue, Shen Hao, Li Ling, Zhai Mo

- Special Award: He Dongxu, Chen Shiji, Fang Zhao and other Yangtze University students who rescued a drowning child

=== 2010 ===
Qian Weichang, Sun Shuilin and Sun Donglin Brothers, Caiwa, Guo Mingyi, Wang Wei, Wang Wanqing, Wang Maohua and Tan Liangcai, He Xiangmei, Liu Li, Sun Yanming

- Special awards: Eight Chinese peacekeeping heroes (See List of People's Armed Police personnel killed in the line of duty#2010s), K165 train crew, and Chinese volunteer groups

=== 2011 ===
Zhu Guangya, Yang Shanzhou, Wu Mengchao, Zhang Pingyi, Wu Juping, Alim, Hu Zhong and Xie Xiaojun and his wife, Meng Peijie, Liu Jinguo, Liu Wei

- Special Award: Bai Fangli and others - all caring people who have been enthusiastic about public welfare for many years but have not received the honor of "Moving China", represented by Mr. Bai Fangli.

=== 2012 ===
Luo Yang, Lin Junde, Li Wenbo, Zhang Lili, Chen Jiashun, Chen Binqiang, Zhou Yuehua and Ai Qi couples, He Yue, Gao Binghan, Gao Shuzhen

- Special tribute: Ministry of Public Security Mekong River "105" special task force

=== 2013 ===
Huang Xuhua, Liu Shenglan, Chen Jungui, Duan Aiping, Shen Kequan and Shen Changjian father and son, Gesander Ji, Wu Peilan, Yao Houzhi, Fang Junming, Gong Quanzhen

- Special Award: China's Manned Spaceflight Heroes Group

=== 2014 ===
Yu Min, Zhu Mincai and Sun Lina couple, Zhao Jiufu, Zhang Jiqing, Tao Yanbo, Mulati Xirifujiang, Xiao Qingfu, Zhu Xiaohui, Shi Changxu, Longhai Courtyard

- Annual tribute: Chinese medical team in Africa fights Ebola

=== 2015 ===
Wu Jinquan, Zhang Baoyan and Qin Yanyou couples, Lang Ping, Tu Youyou, Yan Su, Xu Liping, Mo Zhengao, Guan Dong, Maimaitijiang Wumaier, Wang Kuan

- Special tribute: veterans of the War of Resistance Against Japanese Aggression and patriotic overseas Chinese

=== 2016 ===
Sun Jiadong, Zhang Chao, Wang Feng, Pan Jianwei, Zhi Yueying, Qin Yuefei, Guo Xiaoping, Ablin Abliz, Li Wanjun, Liang Yijian

- Special tribute: China women's national volleyball team

=== 2017 ===
Lu Yonggen, Liao Junbo, Yang Kezhang, Zhuo Ga and Yangzong, Liu Rui, Huang Danian, Lu Lian, Wang Jue, Huang Dafa, Xie Haihua

- Special tribute: Saihanba mechanical forest farm, Hebei province

=== 2018 ===
Cheng Kaijia, Zhong Yang, Wang Jicai/Wang Shihua, Ma Xu, Du Fuguo, Lu Baomin, Liu Chuanjian, Qi Mei Duoji, Zhang Quwei, Zhang Yuhuan

- Special tribute: Reform pioneer

=== 2019 ===
Fan Jinshi, Sichuan Forest Firefighters, Gu Fangzhou, Chu Hua, Zhang Fuqing, Du LAN & You Duanyang, Wu Shuqing, Huang Wenxiu, Pan Weilian, China women's national volleyball team

- Special tribute: The fighters who established and built New China

=== 2020 ===
Zhang Dingyu, Chen Lu, Zhang Guimei, Wan Zuocheng, Xiong Gengxiang and his wife, Wang Hai, Wang Yong, Xie Jun, Ye Jiaying, Mao Xianglin, National Surveying and Mapping Team 1

- Special tribute: Medical personnel during COVID-19

=== 2021 ===
Peng Silu, Yang Zhen-ning, Gu Xue-fen, Wu Tian-yi, Zhu Yan-fu, Su Bingtian, Chen RAE, Zhang Shundong and Mrs Li Guo-xiu, Jiang Mengnan

- Special tribute: Chinese astronauts (Nie Haisheng, Liu Boming, Tang Hongbo)

=== 2022 ===
Qian Qihu, Deng Xialan, Yang Ning, Shen Zhongfang, Xu Congxiang, "Silver hair know broadcast" group, Xu Mengtao, Chen Qingquan, Lu Hong, Lin Zhanxi

=== 2023 ===
Yu Hongru, Liu Lingli, Meng Ermei, Zhang Yufei, Yang Huade, Niu Ben, Mu Yanling, Zhang Liangang, Xiao Kane, the second flight Group of the Air Force Aviation Corps

=== 2024 ===
Luan Enjie, Fan Zhenxi, Zheng Qinwen, Qu Yabo, Lü Mingyu, West volunteer teaching groups of Baoding University, Shen Huazhong, Li Dong, Pang Zhongwang, Li Dengyue, Liu Laozhuang Corps

== Controversies ==
Chinese philanthropist Bai Fangli was nominated twice for the Touching China Annual Person of the Year Award, but was not selected on either occasion, which sparked public dissatisfaction. The media and online platforms circulated criticisms such as "He touched the Chinese people but couldn't touch CCTV?" and "It's easy to touch China, but hard to touch the judges." Notably, the article "Bai Fangli, Why Did You Touch China?" gained widespread attention and was heavily shared online. In 2012, during the Touching China award, CCTV paid special tribute to Bai Fangli, referring to people like him, who were moving but had not received recognition, as "the Bai Fanglis."

- In early December 2010, Chen Baocheng, a journalist from Southern Metropolis Daily, posted on Weibo, claiming that the online voting for candidates, which started on December 1, showed signs of administrative manipulation, with certain candidates receiving a sudden surge in votes and an unusually concentrated distribution of votes in certain areas.
- In 2020, China Digital Times reported that some netizens expressed their dissatisfaction with the exclusion of Dr. Li Wenliang from the Touching China Top 10. Many believed that Li Wenliang was the true "Touching China" figure for his early warnings about the COVID-19 outbreak and his subsequent death.
