= Gao Shuzhen =

Chinese politician

Gao Shuzhen (born 1957) is a female educator from Wali Village, Sigexuang Town, Luannan County, Hebei, China. She served as a delegate to the 12th National People's Congress, representing Hebei.

== Biography ==
Gao Shuzhen is an ordinary rural woman from Wali Village, Sigexuang Town, Luannan County, Hebei Province. Her son, Wang Liguo, was diagnosed with rheumatoid arthritis at the age of four, which left him physically disabled. When he reached school age, he was unable to attend a regular school. In hopes of helping her son, Gao initially planned to set up a small classroom at home. Later, she discovered that there were other children with physical disabilities in nearby villages who were also unable to go to school. As a result, she began running a school in her home for these children.

In April 1998, Gao Shuzhen opened her first “Kangtou Classroom” (a home-based classroom set up on a traditional heated brick bed). The teacher was her daughter, Wang Guoguang. There were five students, four desks, two small blackboards, and a collection of old borrowed textbooks.Over time, Gao began to take in more and more children with disabilities. She never charged a single cent in tuition, despite falling deep into debt. To feed the children, the rice harvested from the more than 20 mu (about 3.3 acres) of paddy fields contracted by her family became their staple food. Gao also traveled long distances to buy household items in bulk and sold them at local markets in order to support the children's daily needs.

After the story of Gao Shuzhen's “Loving Courtyard” was reported by the media, it sparked widespread public attention. Donations poured in from across China, and many volunteers came to the courtyard to offer their services free of charge. A hospital in Shanghai also performed medical procedures and surgeries for ten of the children at no cost.

At the end of 2012, Gao Shuzhen was elected with a high number of votes as one of the “Touching Hebei 2012 Persons of the Year.” On February 19, 2013, the Touching China Annual Person of the Year Award ceremony was broadcast on CCTV-1, where she was selected as one of the national honorees. In 2013, Gao Shuzhen was elected as a deputy to the 12th National People's Congress.

On March 10, 2013, during a group discussion session of the Hebei delegation at the 12th National People's Congress, her speech was met with a round of applause from the entire room.
