= Sun Jun (engineer) =

Chinese engineer (1926–2024)

- 孙钧
- Born: 23 October 1926; Wu County, Jiangsu, China
- Died: 1 March 2024 (aged 97); Shanghai, China
- Education: St. John's University, Shanghai; Jiaotong University
- Scientific career
- Fields: Tunnel and underground structure engineering
- Workplaces: Tongji University

Chinese name
- Simplified Chinese: 孙钧
- Traditional Chinese: 孫鈞
Transcriptions
Standard Mandarin
- Hanyu Pinyin: Sūn Jūn

Sun Jun (Chinese: 孙钧; 23 October 1926 – 1 March 2024) was a Chinese tunnel and underground structure engineer who served as president of the Chinese Society for Rock Mechanics & Engineering from 1994 to 1998, and an academician of the Chinese Academy of Sciences. He was a member of the Chinese Communist Party (CCP).

== Biography ==
Sun was born in Wu County (now Suzhou), Jiangsu, on 23 October 1926, while his ancestral home in Shaoxing, Zhejiang. He attended Jiangsu Provincial Shanghai High School. In 1944, he enrolled at St. John's University, Shanghai, but transferred to Jiaotong University.

After University in 1949, he became a technician from the East China Airlines and Public Housing Management Office in Shanghai. After a year as a teaching assistant at Jiaotong University between 1951 and 1952, he moved to Tongji University, where he successively served as a lecturer, associate professor, deputy director of the Department of Underground Engineering, director of the Academic Affairs Office, professor, head of the Department of Structural Engineering, honorary head of the Department of Underground Building Engineering, member of the School Affairs Committee, and vice chairman of the School Academic Committee. He joined the Chinese Communist Party (CCP) in 1958. From 1980 to 1981, he was a visiting professor at the North Carolina State University.

On 1 March 2024, he died from an illness at Shanghai Zhongshan Hospital, at the age of 97.

== Honours and awards ==
- November 1991 Member of the Chinese Academy of Sciences (CAS)
- 2015 Fellow of the International Society for Rock Mechanics (ISRM)

Academic offices
| Preceded by Chen Zongji | President of the Chinese Society for Rock Mechanics & Engineering; 1994–1998 | Succeeded by Wang Sijing |
