= Sun Jun =

Sun Jun may refer to:

- Sun Jun (Eastern Wu) (219–256), regent for the emperor Sun Liang of Eastern Wu during the Three Kingdoms period
- Sun Jun (engineer) (born 1926), Chinese tunnel and underground structure engineer, member of the Chinese Academy of Sciences
- Sun Jun (basketball) (born 1969), Chinese basketball player
- Sun Jun (badminton) (born 1975), Chinese badminton player
- Sun Jun (rower) (born 1975), Chinese rower
- Sun Jun (footballer) (born 1993), Chinese footballer
