= Xu Benyu =

Chinese politician

Xu Benyu (Chinese: 徐本禹, born April 1982) is a Chinese political figure from Liaocheng, Shandong Province. He was named one of the “Touching China” Persons of the Year and currently serves as Deputy Secretary of the Hubei Provincial Committee of the Communist Youth League of China.

== Biography ==
Xu was born into a poor rural family in Liaocheng, Shandong. From 1999 to 2003, he studied at Huazhong Agricultural University. In 2003, he was admitted as a publicly funded postgraduate student in Agricultural Economics and Management. However, instead of continuing his studies immediately, he chose to volunteer as a teacher at Yandong Primary School in Goudiaoyan Village, Maochang Town, and Dashiban Primary School in Dashicun Village, Dashui Township, Dafang County, Guizhou Province. Xu gained national attention through an article titled "Two Mountain Village Schools and a Volunteer Teacher" posted on the Tianya online forum. In 2004, he was named one of China Central Television's “Touching China” Persons of the Year.

He was among the first group of Chinese volunteers sent to Africa after the Forum on China-Africa Cooperation, and the first Chinese volunteer dispatched to Zimbabwe. On January 24, 2007, he went to Zimbabwe to teach Chinese. In October 2007, he attended the 17th National Congress of the Chinese Communist Party in Beijing as a delegate. In May 2008, he was appointed Deputy Secretary of the Youth League Committee at Huazhong Agricultural University. In May 2010, Xu began working at the Hubei Provincial Committee of the Communist Youth League. He held several positions, including deputy director of the School Department, deputy director of the Provincial Youth Volunteer Action Guidance Center, Director of the Industrial Development Management Center, and Director of the School Department. In December 2017, Xu was appointed Deputy Secretary of the CPC Zigui County Committee. In June 2021, he became Party Secretary and Chairman of the Yichang Federation of Social Sciences, holding the rank of First-Class Investigator. In August 2022, he returned to Wuhan and was promoted to Deputy Secreta.
