= Jin Guiyun =

Chinese archaeologist

- 靳桂云
- Occupations: Archaeologist; Professor at Shandong University

Academic background
- Education: Shandong University; Chinese Academy of Sciences

Jin Guiyun (Chinese: 靳桂云) is currently a professor in the School of History and Culture at Shandong University. Her research primarily employs archaeobotany and soil micromorphology analysis methods to interpret human activities at the site, as well as to understand the interactions between humans and the natural environment. This includes studies on early farming practices in northern China and human-land interactions of the Longshan culture based on agriculture and environment research in the Haidai region.

== Biography ==
=== Education ===
Jin Guiyun completed her undergraduate degree in archaeology from School of History and Culture at Shandong University in 1986. She continued for her master’s degree in archaeology at Shandong University. She then obtained her Ph.D. in Quaternary Geology from Institute of Geo and Geophysics at Chinese Academy of Sciences in 1999. Her Ph.D. dissertation was on the Mid-Holocene climate change and its effect on cultural development in Northern China, under the supervision of Liu Dongsheng 刘东生.

=== Career ===
After master’s graduation, Jin Guiyun worked as an archaeologist at the Shandong Provincial Institute of Cultural Relics and Archaeology from 1989 to 2003.

In 1989, she was appointed as an assistant curator of cultural heritage, and in 1992, she was promoted to curator of cultural heritage. She has participated in the excavation of sites, including the tombs of the Qi State during the Eastern Zhou period at Zihedian, the Chengziya site in Zhangqiu, and the Jingyanggang site in Yanggu. In 2000, she was appointed as associate research librarian. In 2001, she was qualified as a research librarian and served as Deputy Director of the Technical Department from April 2001 to November 2003.

From June 2002 to October 2003, she was a Senior Visiting Scholar to German Archaeological Institute funded by Alexander von Humboldt-stiftung.

Since November 2003, she has been Director of the Environmental Archaeology Research Laboratory at Shandong University, dedicated to archaeobotany, zooarchaeology, and lithic analysis.

In December 2009, she held the position of Deputy Director of the Archaeological Teaching Laboratory at Shandong University.

== Works ==
Luan Fengshi 栾丰实, Fang Hui 方辉, Jin Guiyun 靳桂云. (2002). Kaoguxue lilun fangfa jishu 考古学理论方法技术. Beijing: Cultural Relics Press.

Liu Changjiang 刘长江, Jin Guiyun 靳桂云, Kong Zhaochen 孔昭宸. (2008). Zhiwu kaogu: zhongzi he guoshi yanjiu 植物考古：种子和果实研究. Beijing: Kexue Chubanshe 科学出版社.

Jin Guiyun 靳桂云, Liu Dongsheng 刘东生. (2002). Mid-Holocene climate change in North China, and the effect on cultural development. Chinese Science Bulletin, 47, 408-413.

Kong Zhaochen 孔昭宸, Liu Changjiang 刘长江, Zhang Juzhong 张居中, Jin Guiyun 靳桂云. (2003). Zhongguo kaogu yizhi zhiwu yicun yu yuanshi nongye 中国考古遗址植物遗存与原始农业. Zhongyuan wenwu 中原文物 (02), 4-9+13.

Jin Guiyun 靳桂云, Yu Haiguang 于海广, Luan Fengshi 栾丰实, Wang Chunyan 王春燕, A.P.Underhill, Yao Xishen 腰希申. (2006). Shandong Rizhao liangchengzhen longshan wenhua yizhi chutu mucai de guqihou yiyi 山东日照两城镇龙山文化遗址出土木材的古气候意义. Disiji yanjiu 第四纪研究 (04), 571-579.

Tarasov Pavel, Jin Guiyun 靳桂云, Wagner Mayke. (2006). Mid-Holocene environmental and human dynamics in northeastern China reconstructed from pollen and archaeological data. Palaeogeography, Palaeoclimatology, Palaeoecology, 241(2), 284-300.

Jin Guiyun 靳桂云. (2007). Zhongguo zaoqi xiaomai de kaogu Faxian yu yanjiu 中国早期小麦的考古发现与研究. Nongye kaogu 农业考古 (04), 11-20.

Jin Guiyun 靳桂云, Yan Shengdong 燕生东, Tetsuro Udatsu 宇田津彻郎, Lan Yufu 兰玉富, Wang Chunyan 王春燕, Tong Peihua 佟佩华. (2007). Shandong jiaozhou zhaojiazhuang yizhi 4000nian qian daotian de zhiguiti zhengju 山东胶州赵家庄遗址4000年前稻田的植硅体证据. Kexue tongbao 科学通报 (18), 2161-2168.

Chen Hui, Wang Fen, Zhang Congyun, Shi Yuanchang, Jin Guiyun, Yuan Shiling (2010). Preparation of nano-silica materials: The concept from wheat straw. Journal of Non-Crystalline Solids, 356(50-51), 2781-2785.

Wang Yuqian 王育茜, Zhang Ping 张萍, Jin Guiyun 靳桂云, Jin Songan 靳松安. (2011). Henan xichuan gouwan yizhi 2007 niandu zhiwu fuxuan jieguo yu fenxi 河南淅川沟湾遗址2007年度植物浮选结果与分析. Sichuan wenwu 四川文物 (02), 80-92.

Jin Guiyun 靳桂云. (2013). Longshan wenhua jumin shiwu jiegou yanjiu 龙山文化居民食物结构研究. Wenshizhe 文史哲 (02), 99-111+167.

Wu Wenwan, Wang Xinghua, Wu Xiaohong, Jin Guiyun, Tarasov Pavel. (2014). The early Holocene archaeobotanical record from the Zhangmatun site situated at the northern edge of the Shandong Highlands, China. Quaternary International, 348, 183-193.

Jin Guiyun, Chen Songtao, Li Hui, Fan Xianjun, Yang Aiguo, Mithen Steven. (2020). The Beixin Culture: archaeobotanical evidence for a population dispersal of Neolithic hunter-gatherer-cultivators in northern China. Antiquity, 94(378), 1426–1443.
