= Li Zhensheng =

Li Zhensheng may refer to:

- Li Zhensheng (geneticist) (born 1931), Chinese geneticist
- Li Zhensheng (photojournalist) (1940–2020), Chinese photojournalist
