= Feng Xiating =

Chinese petrologist

- 冯夏庭

Vice-President of Northeastern University (China)
- Incumbent
- Assumed office August 2017
- President: Zhao Ji

President of Chinese Society for Rock Mechanics & Engineering
- In office 12 November 2016 – 2025
- Preceded by: Qian Qihu
- Succeeded by: He Manchao

Director of the Institute of Rock and Soil Mechanics, Chinese Academy of Sciences
- In office July 2003 – July 2005
- Preceded by: Bai Shiwei
- Succeeded by: Zhu Yaozhong

Personal details
- Born: September 1964 (age 62) Qianshan, Anhui, China
- Party: Chinese Communist Party
- Education: Northeastern University (China)
- Scientific career
- Fields: Rock mechanics
- Workplaces: Northeastern University (China)

Chinese name
- Traditional Chinese: 馮夏庭
- Simplified Chinese: 冯夏庭
Transcriptions
Standard Mandarin
- Hanyu Pinyin: Féng Xiàtíng

Feng Xiating (Chinese: 冯夏庭; born September 1964) is a Chinese petrologist who is a professor and vice-president of Northeastern University (China), and currently president of Chinese Society for Rock Mechanics & Engineering (CSRME). He was president of the International Society for Rock Mechanics (ISRM) from 2011 to 2015.

== Biography ==
Feng was born into a family of farming background in September 1964 in the town of Yujing, Qianshan, Anhui. He received his bachelor's degree and doctor's degree from Northeastern University (China) in 1986 and 1992, respectively. After graduation, the university gave him accelerated promotion to associate professor and to full professor three years later.

He successively worked as a visiting research fellow at the Institute of Resources and Environment Technology in Japan (September 1995–March 1996), senior research officer at the University of the Witwatersrand (May 1996–November 1996), special researcher at the Japan International Industrial Technology Research Institute (December 1996–November 1997), and academy visitor at the Imperial College London (January 2001–March 2001). In June 2001 he became deputy of the Institute of Rock and Soil Mechanics, Chinese Academy of Sciences (CAS), and two years later he rose to become director. In August 2017 he was recalled to the Northeastern University and appointed vice-president.

== Honors and awards ==
- 2004 State Science and Technology Progress Award (Second Class)
- 2010 State Science and Technology Progress Award (Second Class)
- 2013 State Science and Technology Progress Award (Second Class)
- 2017 State Science and Technology Progress Award (Second Class)
- October 4, 2017 Fellow of the International Society for Rock Mechanics (ISRM)
- November 22, 2019 Member of the Chinese Academy of Engineering (CAE)

Academic offices
Preceded by Bai Shiwei	Director of the Institute of Rock and Soil Mechanics, Chinese Academy of Sciences; 2003-2005	Succeeded by Zhu Yaozhong (朱耀仲)
Preceded by Qian Qihu	President of Chinese Society for Rock Mechanics & Engineering; 2016–2025	Succeeded by He Manchao (何满潮)
