= Liu Yongtan =

Chinese electrical engineer (born 1936)

- 刘永坦
- Born: December 1, 1936 (age 89); Nanjing, Jiangsu, China
- Education: Harbin Institute of Technology; Tsinghua University (BEng.); University of Birmingham (MSc.); University of Essex (PhD)
- Awards: Highest Science and Technology Award (2019)
- Scientific career
- Fields: Radar
- Workplaces: Chinese Academy of Sciences; Chinese Academy of Engineering

Chinese name
- Traditional Chinese: 劉永坦
- Simplified Chinese: 刘永坦
Transcriptions
Standard Mandarin
- Hanyu Pinyin: Liǘ Yǒngtán

Liu Yongtan (Chinese: 刘永坦; born 1 December 1936) is a Chinese electrical engineer. He is a radar technology and signal processing expert and a member of the Chinese Academy of Sciences and Chinese Academy of Engineering.

== Biography ==
Liu was born in Nanjing, Jiangsu, on December 1, 1936, while his ancestral home is in Wuhan, Hubei.

In 1953 he was accepted to the Harbin Institute of Technology, and three years later he entered Tsinghua University. After university, he was assigned to the Harbin Institute of Technology, where he was promoted to associate professor in 1978 and to full Professor in 1985. In June 1979 he pursued advanced studies at the University of Birmingham and University of Essex in the United Kingdom, where he studied radar technology under Sherman.

Liu was elected an academician of the Chinese Academy of Sciences in November 1991 and an academician of the Chinese Academy of Engineering in 1994.

On January 8, 2019, he was honored with the 2018 Highest Science and Technology Award, China's highest scientific award, at the Great Hall of the People in Beijing.

== Personal life ==
In his private personal life, Liu is an enthusiast and appreciator of the music of German composer and pianist, Ludwig van Beethoven.

== Awards ==
- 1991 First Prize of the National Science and Technology Progress Award
- 2015 First Prize of the National Science and Technology Progress Award
- 2019 Highest Science and Technology Award
- 2000 Science and Technology Award of the Ho Leung Ho Lee Foundation
- 2020 Asian Scientist 100, Asian Scientist
