= Qian Qihu =

Chinese military engineer

- 钱七虎
- Born: October 1937 (age 88); Kunshan, Jiangsu, China
- Education: Gubischev Military Engineering Institute (CSc.); PLA Institute of Military Enginnering (BEng.)
- Spouse: Yuan Hui
- Awards: Highest Science and Technology Award (2019)
- Scientific career
- Fields: Protection engineering
- Workplaces: Army Engineering University

Chinese name
- Traditional Chinese: 錢七虎
- Simplified Chinese: 钱七虎
Transcriptions
Standard Mandarin
- Hanyu Pinyin: Qián Qīhǔ

Qian Qihu (Chinese: 钱七虎; born October 1937) is a Chinese military engineer and professor. He is a member of the Chinese Academy of Engineering and winner of the Highest Science and Technology Award.

He is currently a professor at Army University of Enginnering of PLA.

== Biography ==
Qian was born in October 1937 in Kunshan, Jiangsu, after the Imperial Japanese Army occupied Shanghai. He enlisted in the People's Liberation Army in 1954 and joined the Chinese Communist Party in 1956. After graduating from the PLA Military Institute of Engineering (now National University of Defense Technology) in 1960, he was sent abroad to study at the Gubischev Military Engineering Institute in Moscow at the expense of the Chinese government. When he returned to China he became a teacher at the PLA Engineering Corps Institute.

Qian was elected a fellow Chinese Academy of Engineering in 1994. Qian attained the rank of major general (shaojiang) in 1988.

In 1993, he was elected a member of the 8th National Committee of the Chinese People's Political Consultative Conference. He was a delegate to the 12th National Congress of the Chinese Communist Party.

In 2003, he was elected director-general of the Chinese Society for Rock Mechanics & Engineering (CSRME) and vice-president of the International Society for Rock Mechanics (ISRM).

On January 8, 2019, he was awarded the Highest Science and Technology Award, China's top science award, at the Great Hall of the People in Beijing.

In 2020, Qian became a laureate of the Asian Scientist 100 by the Asian Scientist.

On 27 July 2022, he was awarded the August 1 Medal.

== Personal life ==
Qian married Yuan Hui (Chinese: 袁晖).

== Awards ==
- 1987 First Prize of the National Civil Air Defense Science and Technology Progress Award
- 1990 Third Prize of the National Science and Technology Progress Award
- 1998 Second Prize of the National Science and Technology Progress Award
- 2011 First Prize of the National Science and Technology Progress Award
- 2013 Science and Technology Award of the Ho Leung Ho Lee Foundation
- 2019 Highest Science and Technology Award
- 2022 August 1 Medal

Academic offices
Preceded by Wang Sijing	President of the Chinese Society for Rock Mechanics & Engineering; 2003–2016	Succeeded by Feng Xiating
