= Xie Jialin =

Chinese physicist

- 谢家麟
- Born: 8 August 1920; Harbin, Heilongjiang, Republic of China
- Died: 20 February 2016 (aged 95); Beijing, People's Republic of China
- Education: Wuhan University; Yenching University; California Institute of Technology; Stanford University
- Awards: Highest Science and Technology Award (2011)
- Scientific career
- Fields: Particle accelerator
- Workplaces: University of Chicago Medical Center; Institute of High Energy Physics

Chinese name
- Simplified Chinese: 谢家麟
- Traditional Chinese: 謝家麟
Transcriptions
Standard Mandarin
- Hanyu Pinyin: Xiè Jiālín

Xie Jialin (Chinese: 谢家麟; 8 August 1920 – 20 February 2016) was a Chinese physicist.

Born in Harbin, he studied physics at Yenching University. Upon graduation in 1943, Xie enrolled at Stanford University, where he earned a Ph.D. in 1951. While working for the University of Chicago Medical Center in 1955, he developed a particle accelerator used to treat cancerous tumors. Later that year, Xie returned to China and helped build the country's first particle accelerator. For his contribution to the development of the 30MeV electron Linear particle accelerator, Xie was awarded the Scientific and Technological Achievement Prize at the 1978 National Science and Technology Conference. Xie went on to become the project director during design, development and construction of the Beijing Electron Positron Collider (BEPC), which was most notably used in precision measurement of the τ lepton. He received the State Preeminent Science and Technology Award for his work in 2011. Xie died on 20 February 2016 at the age of 95 in Beijing.

The inner main-belt asteroid 32928 Xiejialin, discovered by SCAP at the Xinglong Station in 1995, is named in his honor. Naming citation was published on 5 January 2015 (M.P.C. 91791).
