= Highest Science and Technology Award =

Chinese award

- Country: People's Republic of China
- Presented by: President of China
- Reward: 8 million RMB
- First award: 2000; 26 years ago
- Number of laureates: 29 as of 2017

Highest Science and Technology Award
- Traditional Chinese: 國家最高科學技術獎
- Simplified Chinese: 国家最高科学技术奖
Transcriptions
Standard Mandarin
- Hanyu Pinyin: Guójiā Zuìgāo Kēxué Jìshù Jiǎng

The Highest Science and Technology Award (Chinese: 国家最高科学技术奖) also known as the State Preeminent Science and Technology Award, State Supreme Science and Technology Award, or China's Nobel Prize is the highest scientific award issued by the President of the PRC to scientists working in China. The award, given annually each January since 2000, is one of the five State Science and Technology Prizes established by the State Council of China.

The award comes with a prize of 8 million RMB (about 1.16 million USD), with 10% of this awarded, as a bonus to the scientist and the remainder awarded to support the scientist's research.

== Award winners ==
2000

- Yuan Longping - agriculturist
- Wu Wenjun - mathematician

2001

- Wang Xuan - computer scientist
- Huang Kun - physicist

2002

- Jin Yilian - computer scientist

2003

- Liu Dongsheng - geologist
- Wang Yongzhi - aerospace scientist

2004

Not awarded

2005

- Ye Duzheng - meteorologist
- Wu Mengchao - hepatobiliary surgery scientist and surgeon

2006

- Li Zhensheng - plant geneticist

2007

- Min Enze - petrochemical engineer
- Wu Zhengyi - biologist

2008

- Wang Zhongcheng - neurologist
- Xu Guangxian - chemist

2009

- Gu Chaohao - mathematician
- Sun Jiadong - satellite engineer

2010

- Shi Changxu - material scientist
- Wang Zhenyi - pathophysiologist

2011

- Xie Jialin - physicist
- Wu Liangyong - architect

2012

- Zheng Zhemin - physicist
- Wang Xiaomo - radar engineer

2013

- Zhang Cunhao - physical chemist
- Cheng Kaijia - nuclear physicist

2014

- Yu Min - nuclear physicist

2015

Not awarded

2016

- Zhao Zhongxian - physicist
- Tu Youyou - pharmaceutical chemist

2017

- Wang Zeshan - explosives specialist
- Hou Yunde - virologist

2018

- Liu Yongtan - radar technology and signal processing expert
- Qian Qihu - military protection engineering expert

2019

- Huang Xuhua - nuclear submarine engineer
- Zeng Qingcun - meteorologist

2020

- Gu Songfen - aerodynamicist
- Wang Dazhong - nuclear reactor engineer

2023

- Li Deren - expert in photogrammetry and remote sensing
- Xue Qikun - condensed matter physicist

2025

- Chen Liquan
- Ben De

== See also ==
- List of general science and technology awards
- State Science and Technology Prizes
