= Ren Changxia =

Chinese policewoman (1964–2004)

Ren Changxia (任长霞)
- Born: February 8, 1964; Zhengzhou, Henan
- Died: April 15, 2004 (aged 40); Zhengzhou Center Hospital
- Education: Henan Police College
- Police career
- Country: China
- Department: Dengfeng Municipal Public Security Bureau (2001-2004); Zhengzhou Municipal Public Security Bureau (1983-2001)
- Service years: 1983-2004
- Rank: Supervisor 1st Class
- Badge no.: 007041

Ren Changxia (Chinese: 任长霞; pinyin: Rén Chángxiá; February 8, 1964 – April 15, 2004) was a Chinese policewoman. She was ranked Supervisor 1st class, with the badge number 007041. She was formerly the Police chief and party secretary of the Dengfeng Municipal Public Security Bureau (the Chinese term for a Police Department). She was the first ever Female police chief of Henan Province.

== Life ==
Ren was born on February 8, 1964, in Zhengzhou. After graduating from Henan Police College in October 1983, she joined the Zhengzhou Municipal Public Security Bureau's Zhongyuan Subbureau, where she was assigned to the preliminary hearing team at first, then became the deputy manager of the preliminary hearing team, later being the manager of the legal affairs office of the subbureau. She joined the Chinese Communist Party in December 1992. In October 10, she was again promoted to the deputy manager of the Zhengzhou PSB's legal affairs office. In November 1998, she was promoted again to the chief of the Zhengzhou PSB's technical investigations division. She was then reassigned to be the police chief and party secretary of the Dengfeng Municipal Public Security Bureau in April 2001, becoming the first ever female police chief of Henan police officers. In between April 23 and May 1 of 2001, she cracked down on a local gang which engage in racketeering. She established the Dengfeng PSB's appeals and police tip team in April 25, which solved multiple cold cases. In her 3-year career in Dengfeng, she arrested a total of 3 corrupt officers and fired 15 officers who failed to adhere to disclipne guidelines.

== Death ==
On April 14, 2004, Ren headed to Zhengzhou to attend a conference regarding inter-agency intel sharing. On 8:40 PM while returning to Dengfeng on Expressway S85, she was involved in a car accident and was heavily injured. She was rushed to Zhengzhou Center Hospital where she succumbed to her injuries the next day at 1:40 AM. Over 140,000 people attended her funeral on the 17th.

== Legacy ==
She was nominated and won the Touching China Annual Person of the Year Award in 2004 posthumously. In June 2004, she was awarded the honorary title of National Public Security 1st Class Heroic Model. In 2019, she was also awarded the title of Most Beautiful Striver by the General Office of the Chinese Communist Party.

== Service record ==
Over her service in the police, Ren assisted in solving over 3000 cases and arresting over 5000 criminals.

=== Awards and honorary titles ===
- National Public Security 1st Class Heroic Model (Posthumous)
- Most beautiful stirver (Posthumous)
- Touching China Annual Person of the Year Award (Posthumous)
- National May First medal
- National March 8th Red Banner Bearer
- "10 outstanding females of China"
- National outstanding youth worker
- National excellent People's Police award
- Multiple Meritorious Service Medals

== Personal life ==
Her son, Wei Chenyao was born in 1987, and later joined the police in 2009.

== In popular culture ==
- In February 2005, a movie(titled Ren Changxia) starring Zhang Yu as Ren was made, which aired in July of the same year.

== See also ==
- Public Security Bureau (China)
- Line of duty death
