= Wu Zhengyi =

Chinese botanist (1916–2013)

- 吴征镒
- Born: 13 June 1916; Jiujiang, Jiangxi, Republic of China
- Died: 20 June 2013 (aged 97); Kunming, Yunnan, People's Republic of China
- Education: Tsinghua University; National Southwestern Associated University
- Awards: Highest Science and Technology Award (2007)
- Scientific career
- Fields: Botany
- Workplaces: Institute of Botany, Chinese Academy of Sciences
- Author abbrev. (botany): C.Y.Wu

Chinese name
- Simplified Chinese: 吴征镒
- Traditional Chinese: 吳征鎰
Transcriptions
Standard Mandarin
- Hanyu Pinyin: Wú Zhēngyì
- Wade–Giles: Wu Cheng-yih

Wu Zhengyi (Chinese: 吴征镒; June 13, 1916 – June 20, 2013) was a Chinese botanist and an academician of the Chinese Academy of Sciences (CAS). Wu specialized in Botanical Geography and Medicinal Botany. He is also known by the alternative spellings of 'Wu Cheng-yih', 'Wu Zheng Yi' and 'Cheng Yih Wu'.

Wu was born in Jiujiang, Jiangxi, and grew up in Yangzhou, Jiangsu. He graduated from Tsinghua University in 1937. From 1940 to 1942, he pursued his postgraduate study at Peking University, under supervision of Zhang Jingyue, then chair of the department of Biology at PKU. In 1950, Wu became a research fellow and vice director of the Botanical Institute of CAS. He was elected an academician of CAS in 1955. Wu was appointed as the director of Kunming Botanical Institute of CAS in 1958.

International Cosmos Prize prizewinner 1999, On January 8, 2008, Wu received the prestigious State Preeminent Science and Technology Award for 2007, the highest scientific prize awarded in China.
