= Wang Xiaomo =

Chinese radar engineer (1938–2023)

- 王小谟
- Born: 11 November 1938; Jinshan District, Shanghai, China
- Died: 6 March 2023 (aged 84)
- Education: Beijing Institute of Technology
- Awards: Highest Science and Technology Award (2012)
- Scientific career
- Fields: Radar

Wang Xiaomo (simplified Chinese: 王小谟; traditional Chinese: 王小謨; pinyin: Wāng Xiǎomó; 11 November 1938 – 6 March 2023) was a Chinese radar engineer who has been hailed as the "Father of Airborne Warning and Control System in China". Wang had been engaged in the research and design of radar systems for 50 years.

Wang was a delegate to the 9th and 10th National People's Congress.

== Biography ==
Wang was born in Jinshan District of Shanghai, on November 11, 1938. He graduated from the Beijing Institute of Technology.

In 1969, Wang went to Guizhou to form the No. 38 Research Institute, a research agency attached to the Ministry of Electronics Industry. Wang was elevated to president in 1986. In 1990, Wang served as chief engineer of the early warning airplane, to which he made great contributions. In 1995, Wang was elected a fellow of the Chinese Academy of Engineering.

Wang won China's top science award, the Highest Science and Technology Award, in 2012.

== Awards ==
- 1985 and 2010 First prize for National Technological Progress
- 1997 Science and Technology Award of the Ho Leung Ho Lee Foundation
- 2012 Highest Science and Technology Award
