= Wang Zeshan =

Chinese scientist (born 1935)

- 王泽山
- Born: October 10, 1935 (age 90); Jilin City, Manchukuo
- Citizenship: People's Republic of China
- Education: Harbin Military Institute of Technology
- Awards: 2017 Highest Science and Technology Award
- Scientific career
- Fields: Material Science; Explosives
- Workplaces: Nanjing University of Science and Technology

Wang Zeshan (Chinese: 王泽山; born 10 October 1935) is a Chinese scientist who specializes in development of new explosives. He is a full professor at Nanjing University of Science and Technology. Often called the "King of Explosives" and "Chinese Alfred Nobel", his research had significant impact on both civilian and military application of explosives, and he is credited with helping to increase the launch range of Chinese's artillery by more than 20 percent.

One of the main topics of his research was reuse of waste energetic materials. He is also described as the founder the theory of propellant charges. Wang has published more than 15 books and more than 100 scientific articles during his lifetime. He is said to spend 12 hours a day in his laboratory, despite his age.

== Awards ==
He is a member of Chinese Academy of Engineering since 1999. He is the recipient of 2017 Highest Science and Technology Award, which is China's highest scientific award. In 2019, he became a laureate of the Asian Scientist 100 by the Asian Scientist.
