= Chinese Society for Rock Mechanics & Engineering =

Chinese professional body and learned society

- Abbreviation: CSRME
- Founded: 1985
- Type: Professional organization
- Purpose: Rock mechanics
- Location: Beijing, China
- Origins: NG China, ISRM
- Region served: China
- Members: 12,674 (2018)
- Key people: Feng Xiating; He Manchao
- Parent organization: China Association for Science and Technology
- Website: www.csrme.com

The Chinese Society for Rock Mechanics & Engineering (simplified Chinese: 中国岩石力学与工程学会; traditional Chinese: 中國岩石力學與工程學會; pinyin: Zhōngguó Yánshí Lìxué Yǔ Gōngchéng Xuéhuì; abbreviated CSRME) is a professional body and learned society in the field of rock mechanics in China with a focus on water conservation and hydropower, geology and mining, railway transport, national defense engineering, disaster control, environmental protection. As of 2018, it has 6 subordinate working committees, 13 specialized committees, 12 branches, 19 local societies, and 12,674 individual members. It is a constituent of the China Association for Science and Technology (CAST) and a member of the International Society for Rock Mechanics (ISRM).

== History ==
The Chinese Society for Rock Mechanics & Engineering started in 1978 as NG China in the International Society for Rock Mechanics (ISRM). The preparatory committee was founded in 1981 and it was officially established in June 1985.

== Scientific publication ==
- Chinese Journal of Rock Mechanics and Engineering

== List of presidents ==
No.	Name	Chinese name	Notes
1	Chen Zongji	陈宗基	
2	Chen Zongji	陈宗基	
3	Sun Jun	孙钧	
4	Wang Sijing	王思敬	
5	Qian Qihu	钱七虎	
6	Qian Qihu	钱七虎	
7	Feng Xiating	冯夏庭	
8	Feng Xiating/He Manchao	冯夏庭/何满潮	
