= Ben De =

Chinese radar engineer

Ben De, or "De Ben" (surname last), is a Chinese radar expert who has made two major contributions to China's radar industry. He became a academician of the Chinese Academy of Engineering in 2001 and won China's Highest Science and Technology Award in 2026.

== Biography ==
Ben De, male, Manchu people, was born at a rural region in Jilin Province of northeast China in April 1938.

In 1951, due to his excellence performance, Ben was recommended to enter the only middle school in the county with the tuition waived. However, the boarding cost was too heavy for the poor family and Ben had to walk 20 kilometers back and forth home and the middle school every day. And, to further save money, he often walked barefoot, only putting on his shoes when approaching the school.

In 1957, Ben was admitted into the Harbin Institute of Technology, a top university in northeast China.

In 1962, He graduated from Harbin Institute of Technology, and was assigned to work at the Nanjing Research Institute (the 14th Institute) of the Ministry of Electronics Industry, located in Nanjing of Jiangsu Province.

In 1965, Bende participated in a research project on long-range phased array radar, a field dominated by the United States and the Soviet Union.

From 1971, Ben worked at the construction site for over six months each year, enduring the hard living conditions in the remote mountain area.

In 1978, Ben's team successfully designed and developed China's first long-range early warning phased array radar, which extended China's surveillance coverage by thousands of kilometers and made it the third country in the world to master this radar technology. The size of the radar antenna area is equivalent to two basketball courts, and all the control wires combined are over 1,000 kilometers long.

In 1979, Ben was given the task to develop an airborne pulse Doppler fire control rada, crucial for beyond-visual-range air combat. He personally boarded the aircraft for the tests, where he narrowly survived an in-flight engine failure and a malfunctioning landing gear.

In 1989, after ten years of hard work, the project team led by Ben De (chief designer) successfully developed the prototype airborne PD fire control radar, and all test flight missions were successfully completed in 1993.

In 1991, Ben De received the first prize of the National Science and Technology Progress Award.

In 2001, Be De was elected as an academician of the Chinese Academy of Engineering.

In 2016, the airborne active phased array radar developed by Ben's team made its first public appearance at the Zhuhai Airshow.

In July 2026, Be De won China's 2025 Highest Science and Technology Award at the 11th national congress of the China Association for Science and Technology in Beijing.

In the resent years, Ben not only keeps abreast of the latest developments of radar technology, but also travels to primary and secondary schools to give science popularization lectures.

== Contributions ==
Ben De's major contributions include

- Design and development of the first ground-based, ultra-long-range phased-array early-warning radar of China.
- Design and development of China's first airborne pulsed Doppler fire-control radar.

for the building of the land, sea, air, and space-based early-warning and surveillance systems of China.

== Awards and Honors ==
Ben has been honored with

- First prize of the National Science and Technology Progress Award (1991).
- Academician of the Chinese Academy of Engineering (2001).
- China's Highest Science and Technology Award (2026).

== See also ==
- Chinese Academy of Engineering
- Highest Science and Technology Award
- Radar
