= Wang Zhongcheng =

Chinese surgeon and author

- Born: December 20, 1925; Yantai, Shandong, China
- Died: September 30, 2012 (aged 86); Beijing, China
- Education: Peiping Medical College
- Medical career
- Institutions: General Hospital, Tianjin Medical University; Beijing Tongren Hospital; Xuanwu Hospital; Beijing Neurosurgical Institute; Beijing Tiantan Hospital; Institute for Clinical Neuroscience, Tsinghua University
- Sub-specialties: Neurosurgery

Wang Zhongcheng (simplified Chinese: 王忠诚; traditional Chinese: 王忠誠; Wade–Giles: Wang Chung-ch'eng; December 20, 1925 – September 30, 2012) was a Chinese surgeon, and author of many literature which greatly popularized cerebral angiography and microneurosurgery techniques in mainland China.

Wang was a native of Yantai. He began as a general surgeon, but soon turned to neurosurgery. He served as President of Xuwu Hospital, Director of the Beijing Neurosurgical Institute and President of Beijing Tiantan Hospital. He performed more than 10,000 operations over his career.

He was selected as an academician of Chinese Academy of Engineering in 1994, and was awarded the Highest Science and Technology Award of 2008.
