= Zhang Cunhao =

Chinese physical chemist (1928–2024)

- 张存浩
- Born: February 23, 1928; Tianjin, China
- Died: July 12, 2024 (aged 96); Beijing, China
- Education: National Central University; University of Michigan
- Spouse: Chi Yunxia (m. 1954)
- Children: 2
- Awards: Highest Science and Technology Award (2013)
- Scientific career
- Fields: Chemical laser Molecular reaction dynamics
- Workplaces: Chinese Academy of Sciences

Zhang Cunhao (simplified Chinese: 张存浩; traditional Chinese: 張存浩; pinyin: Zhāng Cúnhào; February 23, 1928 – July 12, 2024) was a Chinese physical chemist and an academician of the Chinese Academy of Sciences.

== Biography ==
Zhang was born in Tianjin, on February 23, 1928, to Zhang Zhu (张铸), an engineer, and Long Wenyuan (龙文媛). Zhang's younger brother Zhang Cunji is a hydraulician. Zhang's ancestral home in Wudi County, Shandong. His grandfather Zhang Mingqi was the last Viceroy of Liangguang from April 14 to November 8, 1911, in the Qing Empire. His grandmother was a descendant of Ji Xiaolan. His maternal grandfather Long Jiguang (1867–1925) was a general of the late Qing and early Republican period of China. His uncles Zhang Rui (张锐), Zhang Bo (张镈) and Zhang Jun (张钧) were architects. His aunt Zhang Jin (张锦; 1910–1965) was a chemist and educator. His uncle-in-law Fu Ying (傅鹰; 1902–1979) was a physical chemist and chemist and former vice-president of Peking University.

He attended the Chongqing Nankai Secondary School and Changting No. 1 High School. In 1943, he was accepted to Xiamen University but one year later he had transferred to National Central University. In 1948, during the Chinese Civil War, he pursued advanced studies in the United States, earning a master's degree in chemistry from the University of Michigan in 1950. Zhang returned to the newly established Communist State in October that same year.

Since June 1955, Zhang has been working at the Chinese Academy of Sciences (CAS). He was elected an academician in 1980. He became a member of the Academic Degree Commission of the State Council in 1998. He was elected a fellow of The World Academy of Sciences (TWAS) in 1992 and of the Royal Society of Chemistry in 2007.

In 2013, Zhang was awarded the Highest Science and Technology Award, the highest scientific award in China. In 2016, an asteroid was named after Zhang.

Zhang was a delegate to the 13th and 14th National Congress of the Chinese Communist Party. He was a deputy to the 3rd National People's Congress. He was also a Standing Committee member of the 8th and 9th Chinese People's Political Consultative Conference.

== Personal life and death ==
Zhang married Chi Yunxia (迟云霞; 遲雲霞) in 1954; the couple had two sons.

On July 12, 2024, Zhang died in Beijing at the age of 96 following a protracted illness.
