= Wang Sijing =

Chinese geologist (1934–2025)

- 王思敬
- Born: 27 December 1934; Shanghai, China
- Died: 15 September 2025 (aged 90); Beijing, China
- Education: Russian State Geological Exploration University
- Scientific career
- Fields: Geology
- Workplaces: Institute of Geology, Chinese Academy of Sciences

Wang Sijing (Chinese: 王思敬; pinyin: Wáng Sījìng; 27 December 1934 – 15 September 2025) was a Chinese geologist who served as director of the Institute of Geology, Chinese Academy of Sciences, from 1984 to 1987, president of the Chinese Society for Rock Mechanics & Engineering from 1998 to 2003, and an academician of the Chinese Academy of Engineering.

== Biography ==
Wang was born in Shanghai, on 27 December 1934, while his ancestral home is in Chaohu, Anhui. He attended Shanghai Wusong High School. In 1954, he was sent to study at Moscow Institute of Geological Exploration (now Russian State Geological Exploration University) on government scholarships.

Wang returned to China in 1963 and was assigned to the Institute of Geology, Chinese Academy of Sciences, where he successively served as associate researcher (1978), researcher (1981), and doctoral supervisor (1983). He joined the Chinese Communist Party (CCP) in February 1963. In January 1984, he became deputy director of the Institute of Geology, Chinese Academy of Sciences, rising to director in 1987. In 2002, he was recruited as a professor at the Department of Water Resources and Hydropower Engineering, Tsinghua University.

On 15 September 2025, Wang died in Beijing at the age of 90.

== Honours and awards ==
- 1986 State Science and Technology Progress Award (First Class)
- 1995 Member of the Chinese Academy of Engineering (CAE)

Academic offices
Preceded by Sun Jun	President of the Chinese Society for Rock Mechanics & Engineering; 1998–2003	Succeeded by Qian Qihu
