= Zheng Zhemin =

Chinese physicist (1924–2021)

- 郑哲敏
- Born: 2 October 1924; Jinan, Shandong, China
- Died: 25 August 2021 (aged 96); Beijing, China
- Other name: Cheng Che-Min
- Education: Tsinghua University (BS); California Institute of Technology (MS, PhD)
- Awards: Academician of the Chinese Academy of Sciences; Highest Science and Technology Award
- Scientific career
- Fields: Explosives engineering Physics
- Thesis: Studies on Thermal Stresses in Elastic Solids (1952)
- Doctoral advisor: Tsien, Hsue Shen

Chinese name
- Simplified Chinese: 郑哲敏
- Traditional Chinese: 鄭哲敏
Transcriptions
Standard Mandarin
- Hanyu Pinyin: Zhèng Zhémǐn
- Wade–Giles: Cheng^{4} Che^{2}-min^{3}

Zheng Zhemin (2 October 1924 – 25 August 2021), also romanized as Cheng Che-Min, was a Chinese explosives engineer and physicist specializing in explosive mechanics.

== Biography ==
Zheng is a native of Yin County (now Yinzhou District) of Ningbo, Zhejiang Province, and was born in Jinan of Shandong Province. He obtained a BS from Tsinghua University in 1947, and a MS and a PhD in mechanical engineering from the California Institute of Technology in 1952. His doctoral advisor was Qian Xuesen.

In 1955, Zheng returned to China and later served as Director of the Institute of Mechanics of the Chinese Academy of Sciences (CAS), President of the Chinese Mechanical Society, and Editor-in-Chief of the Chinese Journal of Theoretical and Applied Mechanics (中国力学学报).

He joined the Chinese Communist Party in 1983.

He died from an illness in Beijing, on 25 August 2021, aged 96.

== Honors and awards ==
- 1980, Academician of the Chinese Academy of Sciences
- 1993, Foreign associate of the United States National Academy of Engineering
- 1993, Tan Kah Kee Science Award
- 1994, Academician of the Chinese Academy of Engineering
- 2012, State Preeminent Science and Technology Award
