= Shandong Agricultural University =

Comprehensive university in Shandong, China

- 山东农业大学
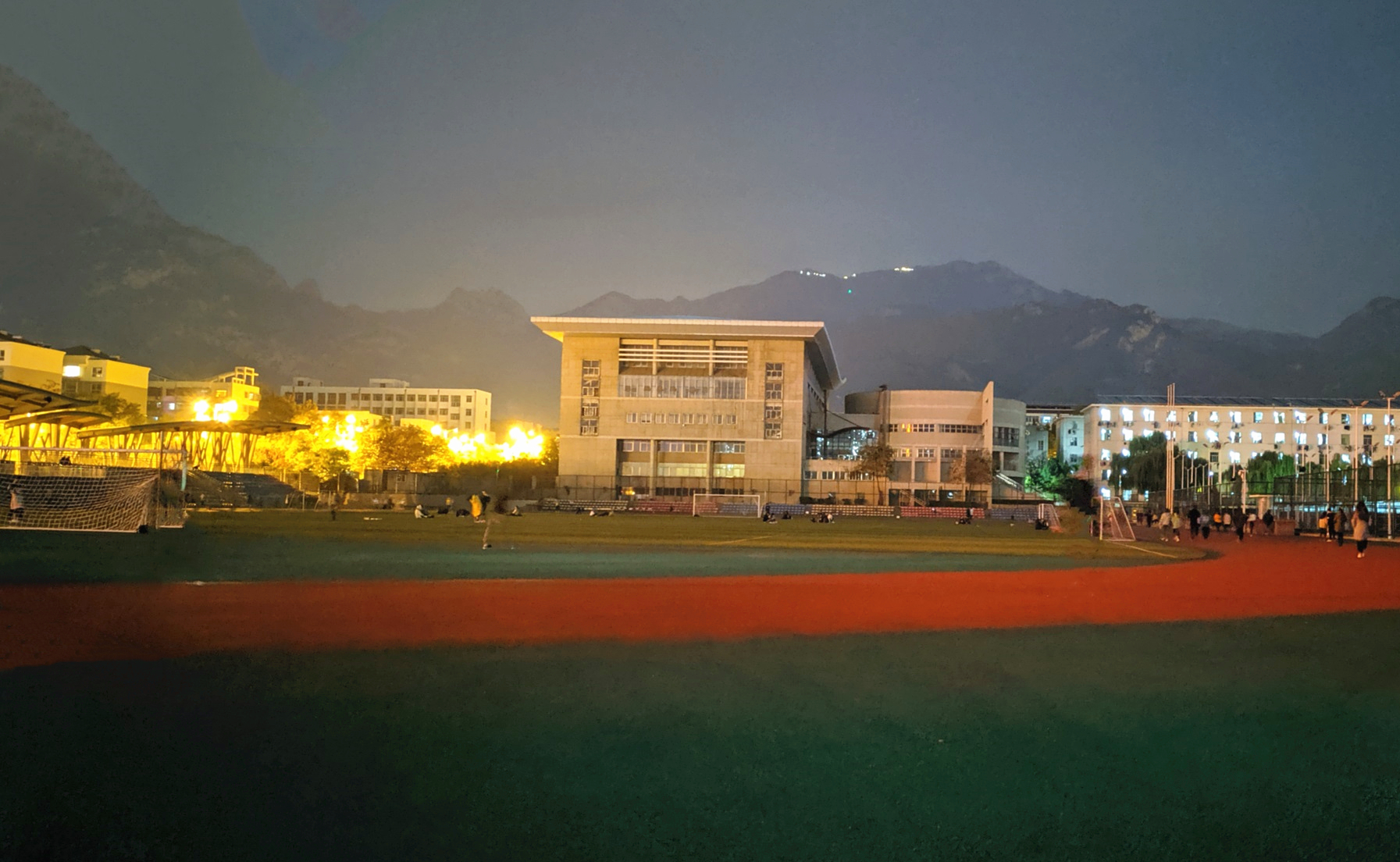
- Type: Public
- Established: 1906; 120 years ago
- President: Wen Fujiang (温孚江)
- Location: Tai'an, Shandong, China
- Campus: urban 353 ha
- Website: www.sdau.edu.cn

Shandong Agricultural University (SDAU; Chinese: 山东农业大学; pinyin: Shāndōng Nóngyè Dàxué), established in 1906, is a comprehensive university in Shandong, China. Several academicians from the Chinese Academy of Sciences and the Chinese Academy of Engineering are graduates from SDAU.

== Overview ==
SDAU covers an area of more than 5,300 mu (about 353 ha). SDAU has set up 19 institutes. The Chinese geneticist Li Zhensheng was a graduate in this university.

== History ==
SDAU was established in 1906 in Jinan and was called Shandong Higher Agricultural School (山东高等农业学堂). Later, the university changed its name to Shandong Agriculture College (山东农学院) in 1952. In 1958, SDAU was moved to Tai'an and in 1983 SDAU got its name.

== Campus Setup ==
Shandong Agricultural University has a main campus (North Campus) and a South Campus. The East Campus has been cancelled due to demolition. There is also the Baimahe Teaching and Experimental Centre (Baimahe Farm) in Shiwu Town, Zoucheng County.

=== North Campus ===
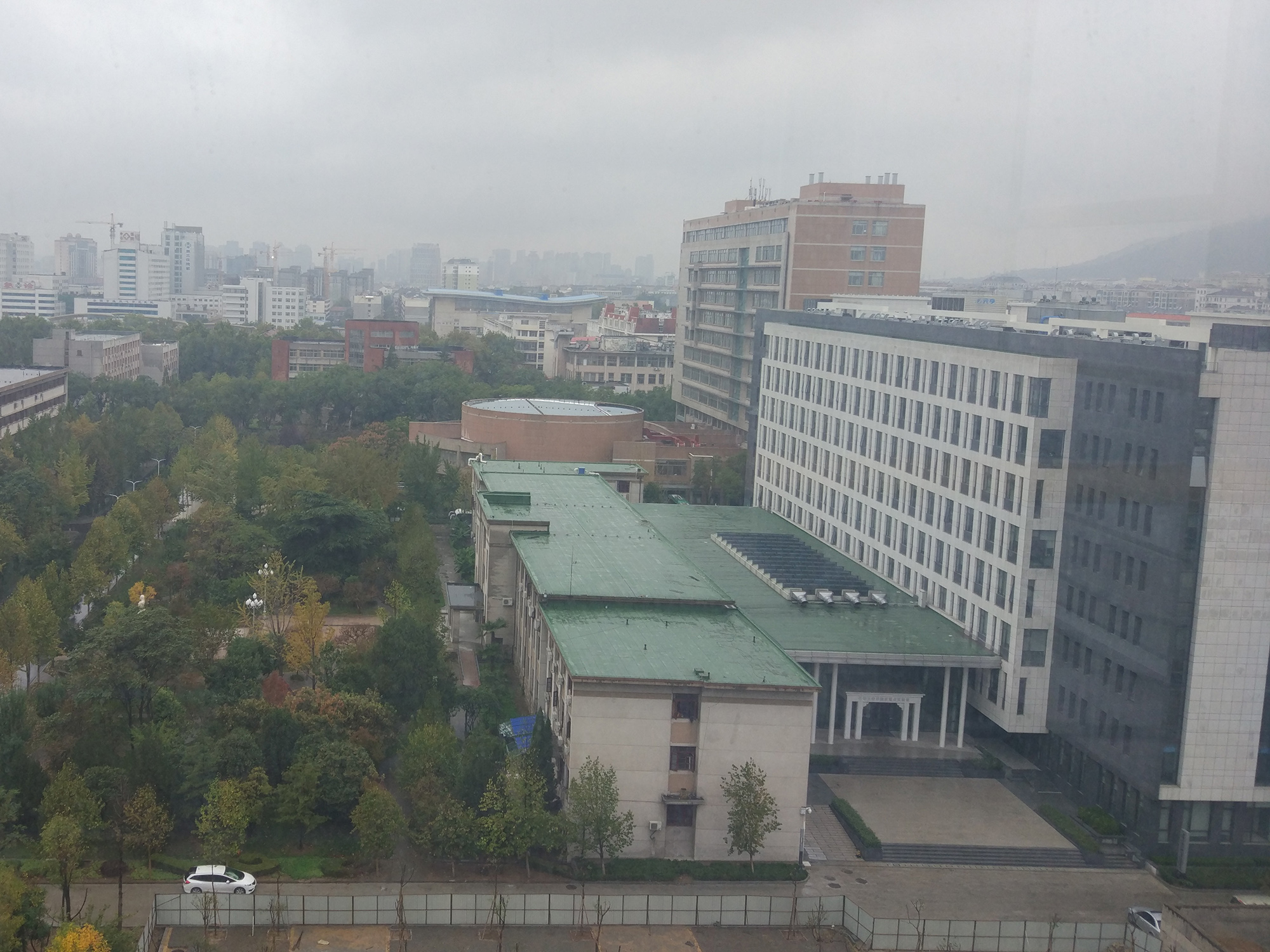
State Key Laboratory of Crop Biology, Shandong Agricultural University

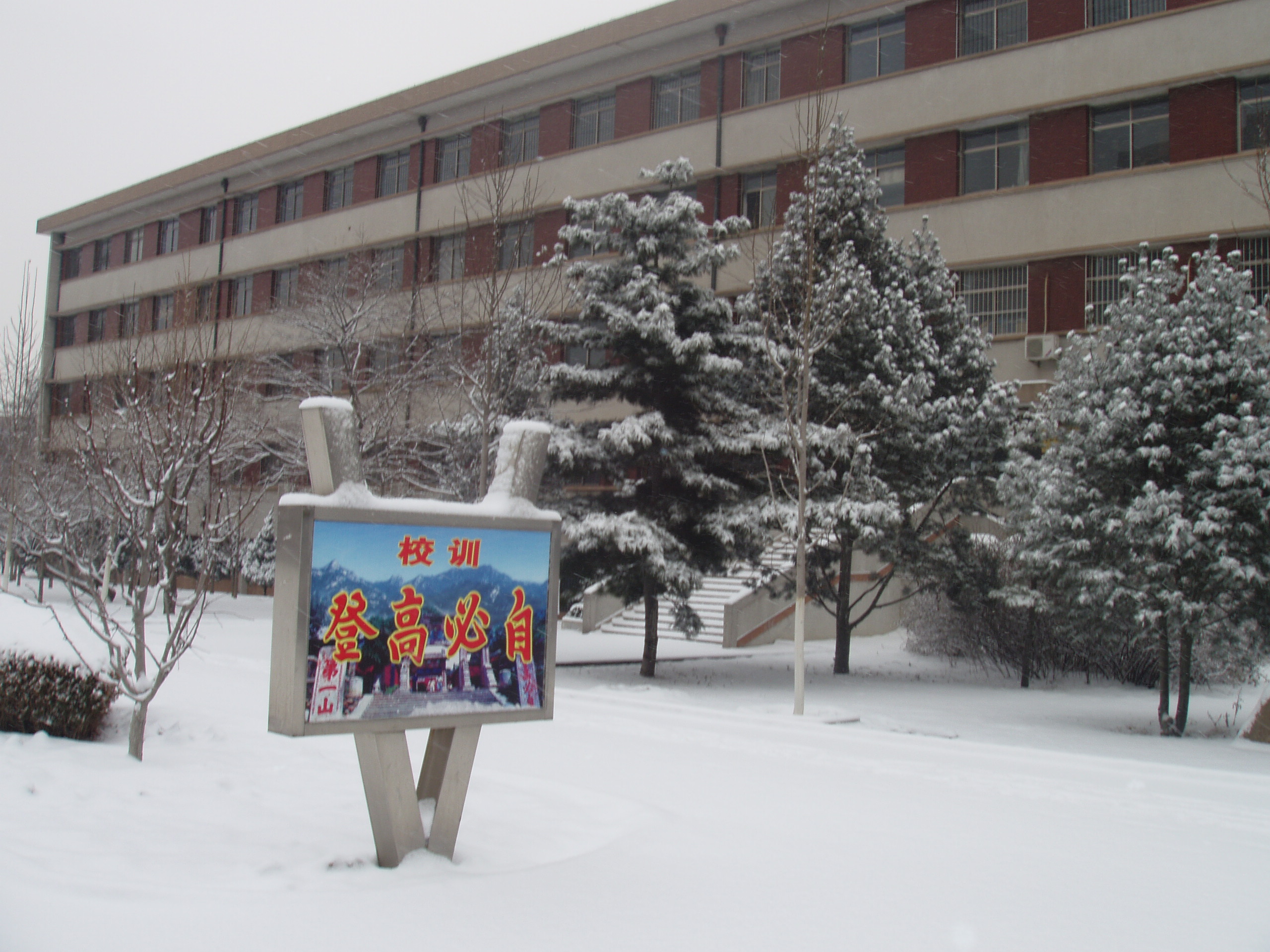
College of Mechanical and Electronic Engineering, Shandong Agricultural University

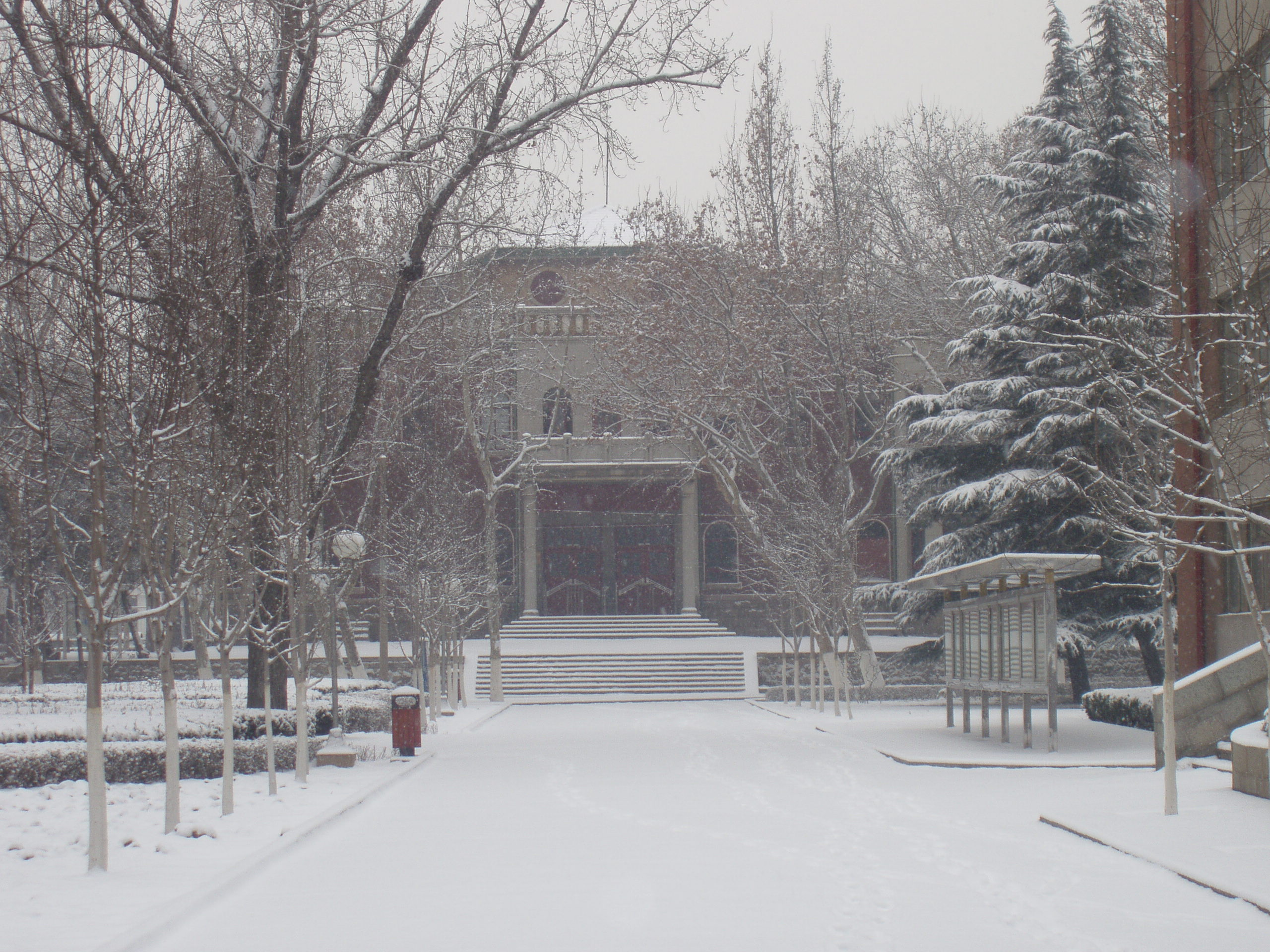
West Auditorium, Key Protected Cultural Relics of Shandong Province (photographed on 8 February 2008)

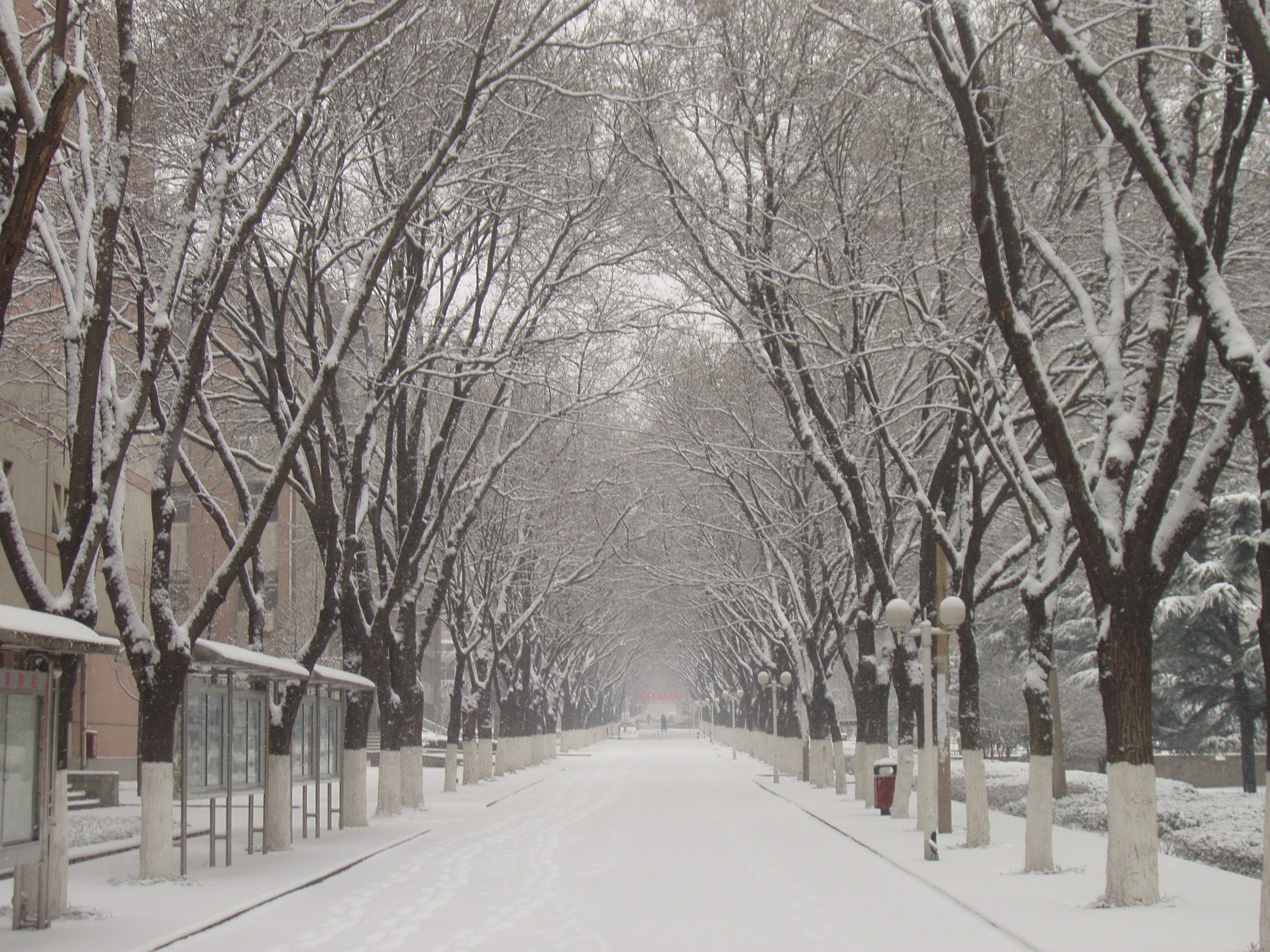
Xue Lin Road, North Campus (8 February 2008)

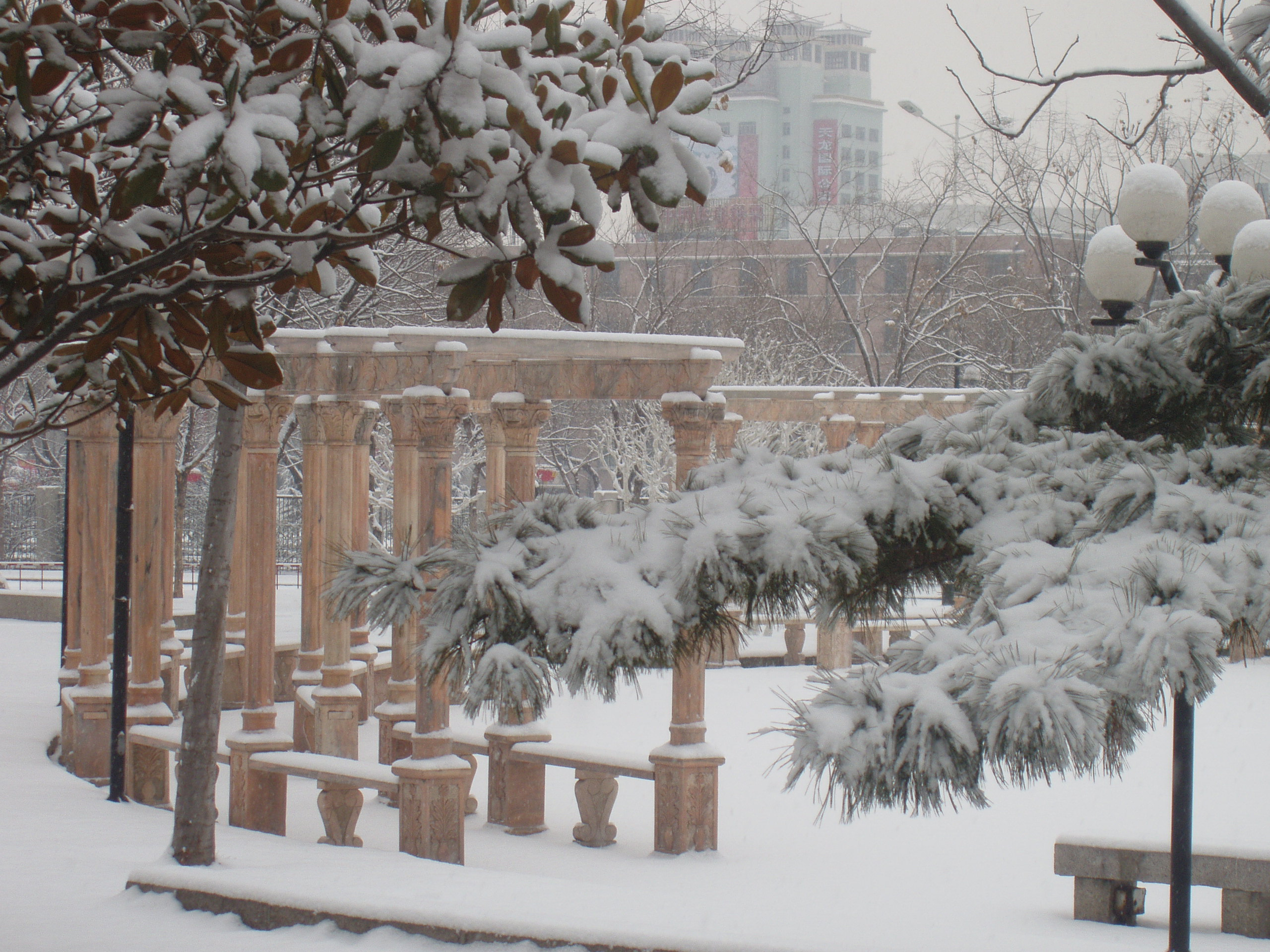
North Campus Youth Plaza 2008

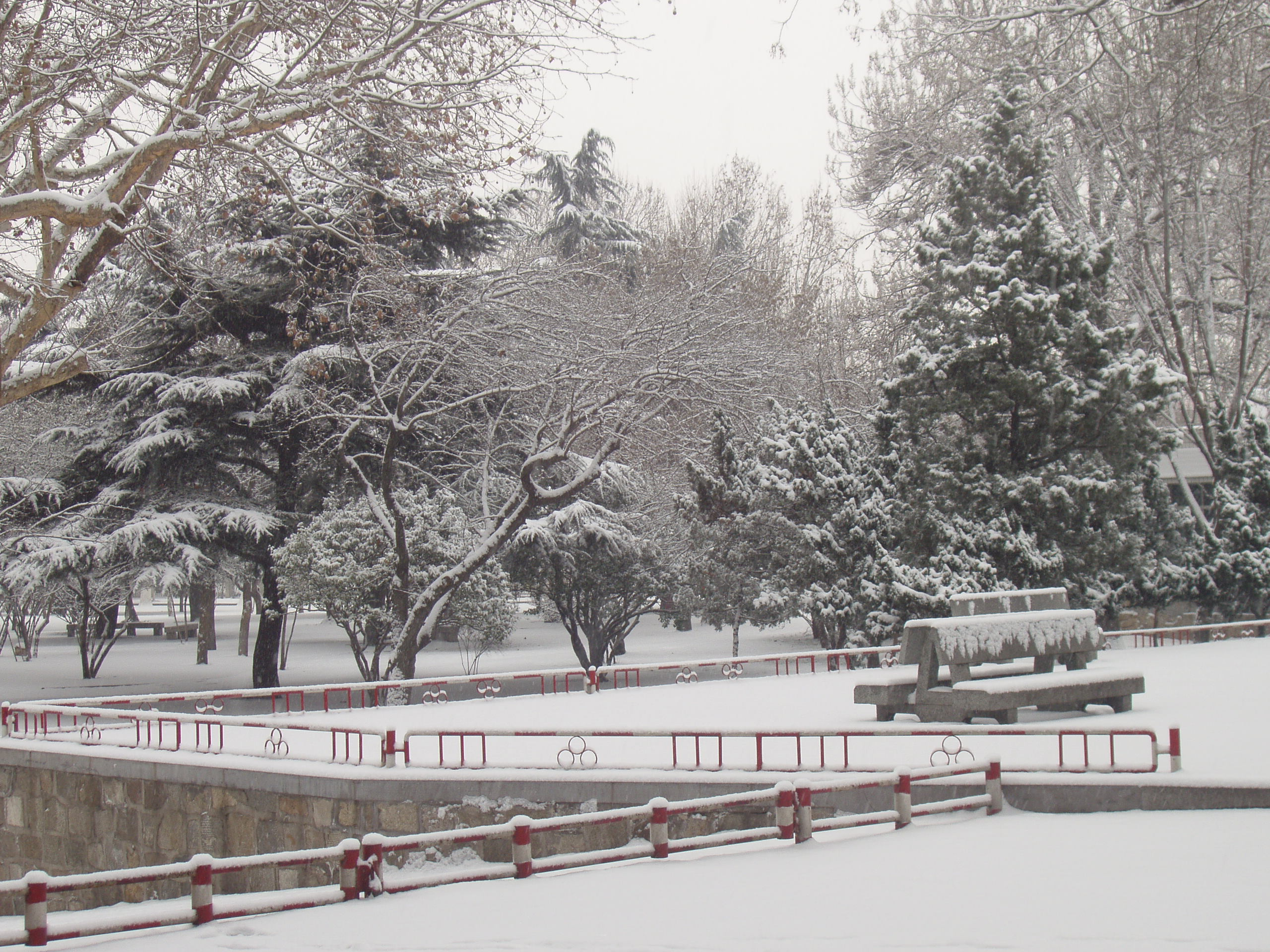
5S Activity area next to the school building 2008

=== South Campus ===
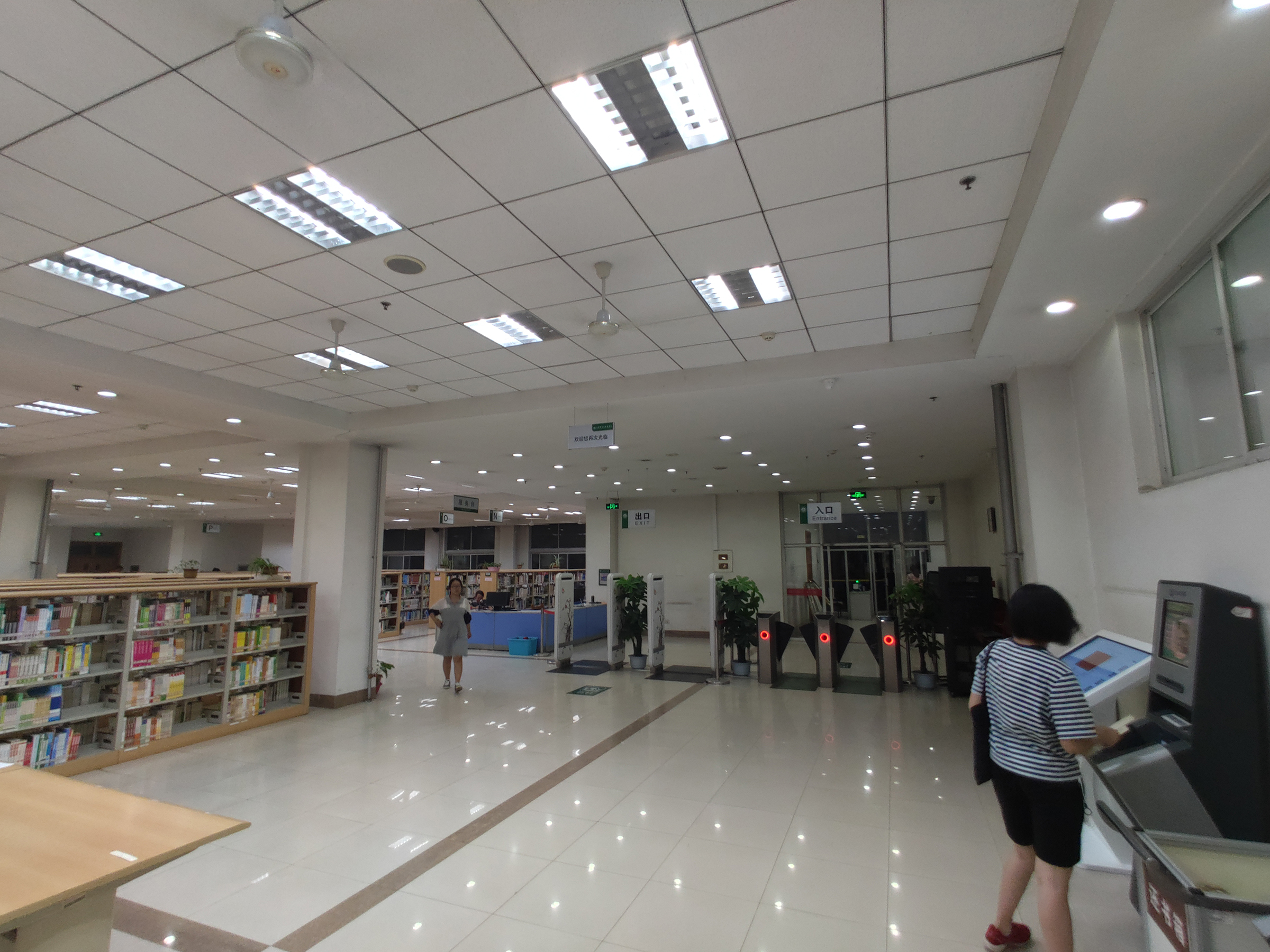
Natural Science Lending Room, Tushin Building, South Campus

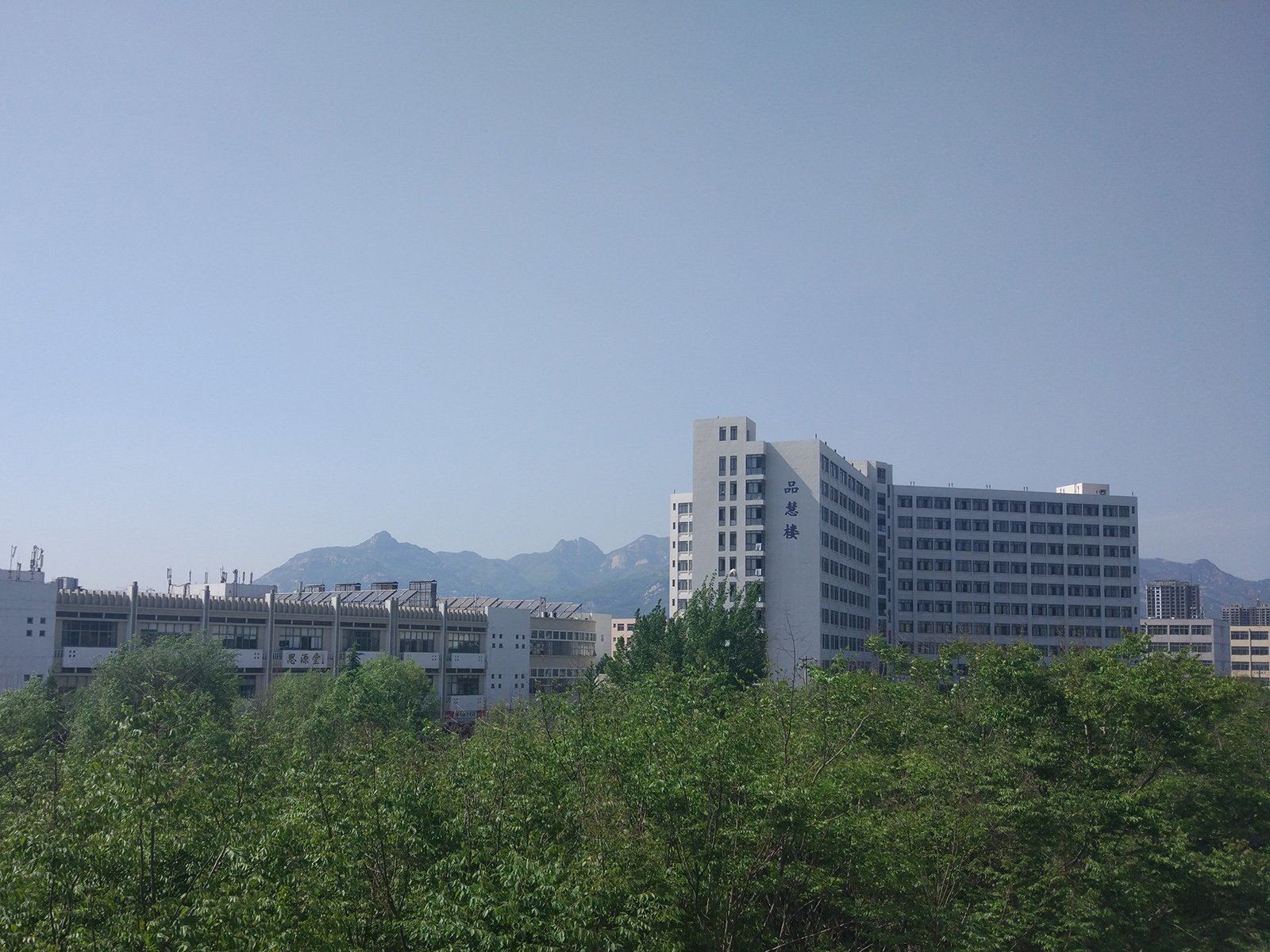
Shandong Agricultural University, Pinhui Building, Siyuan Hall

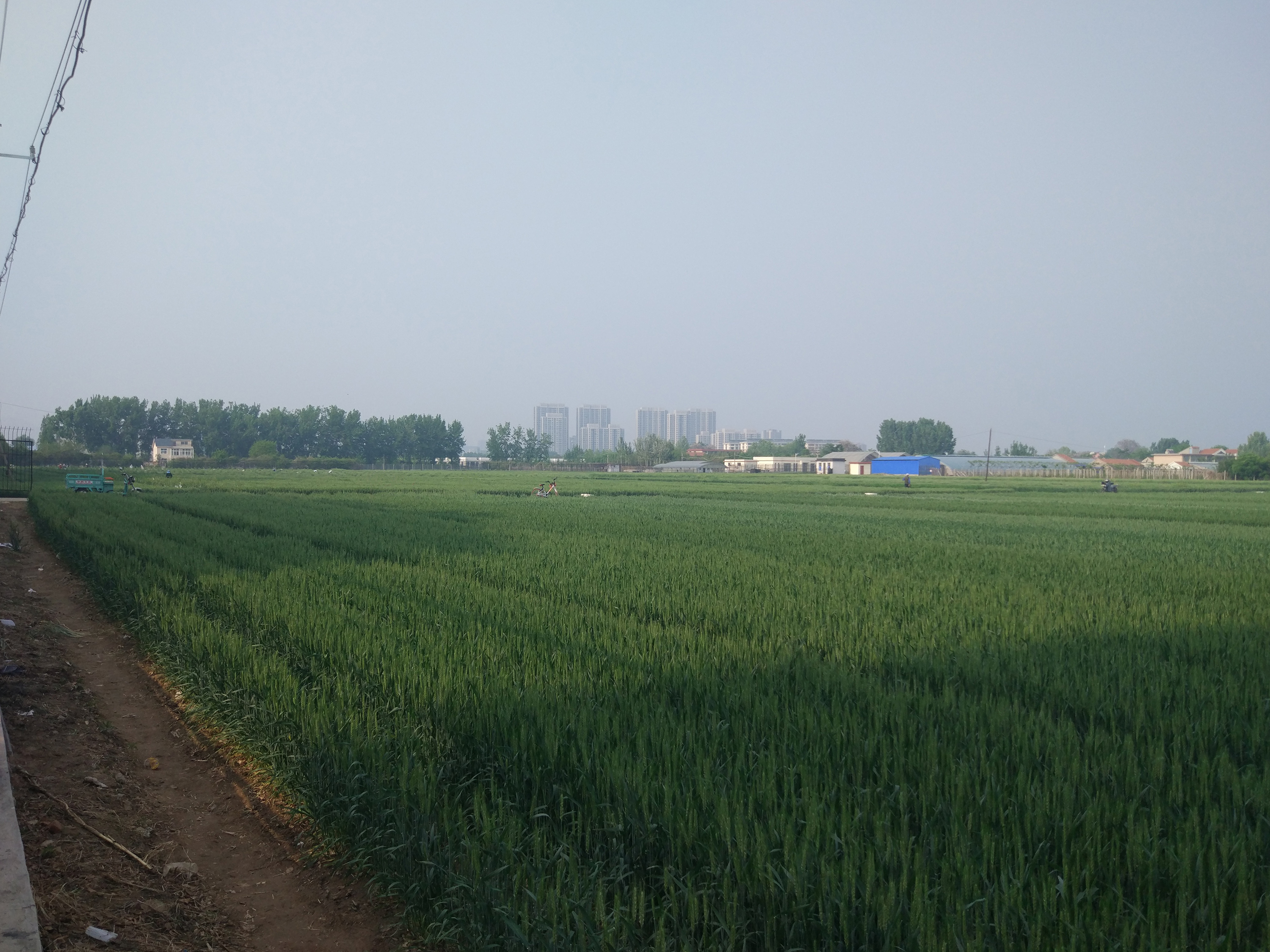
Shandong Agricultural University South Campus East Experimental Field

=== East Campus ===
Former Shandong Province Tai'an Forestry School until 1999, mostly demolished in July 2019.

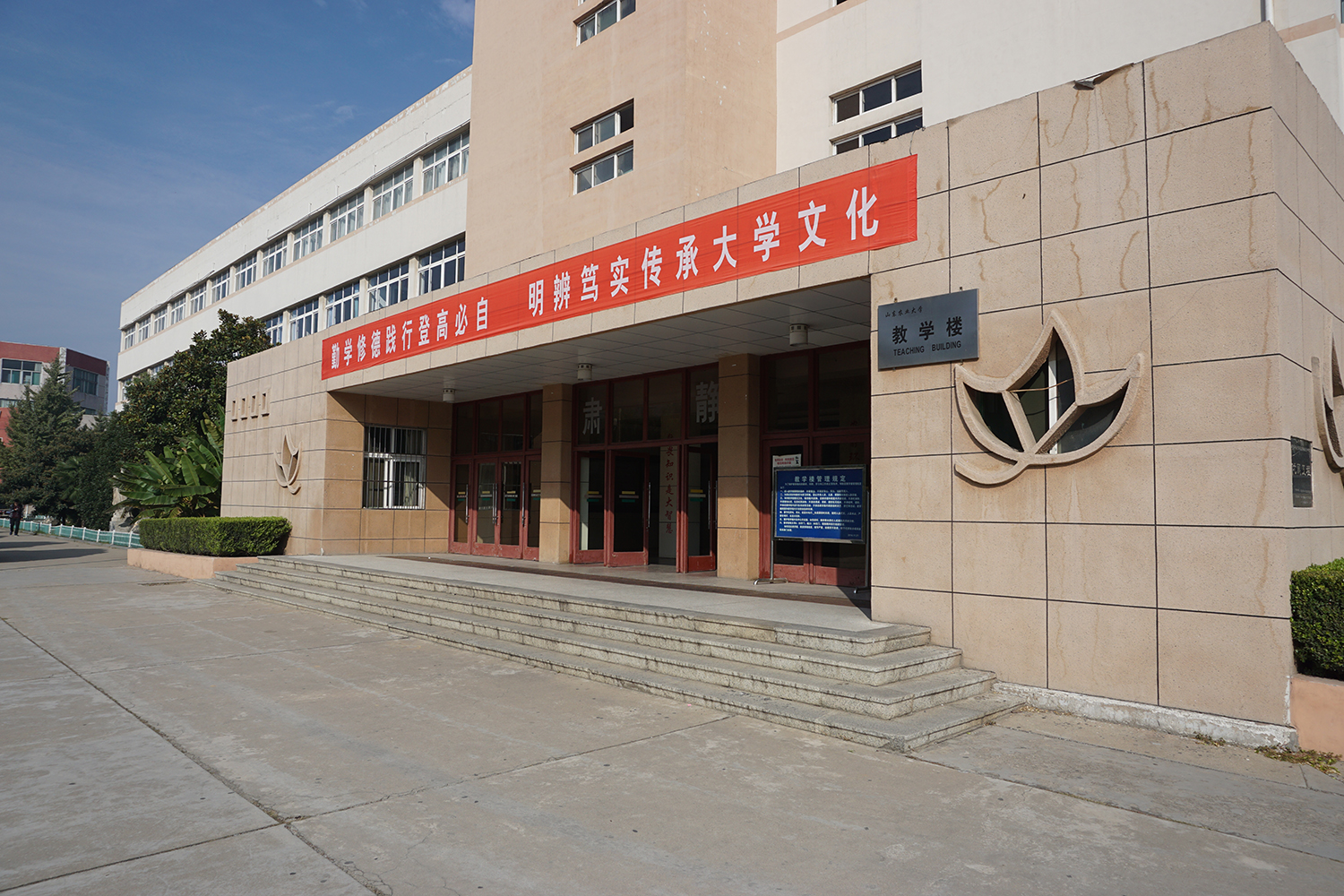
East Campus Teaching Building 2017

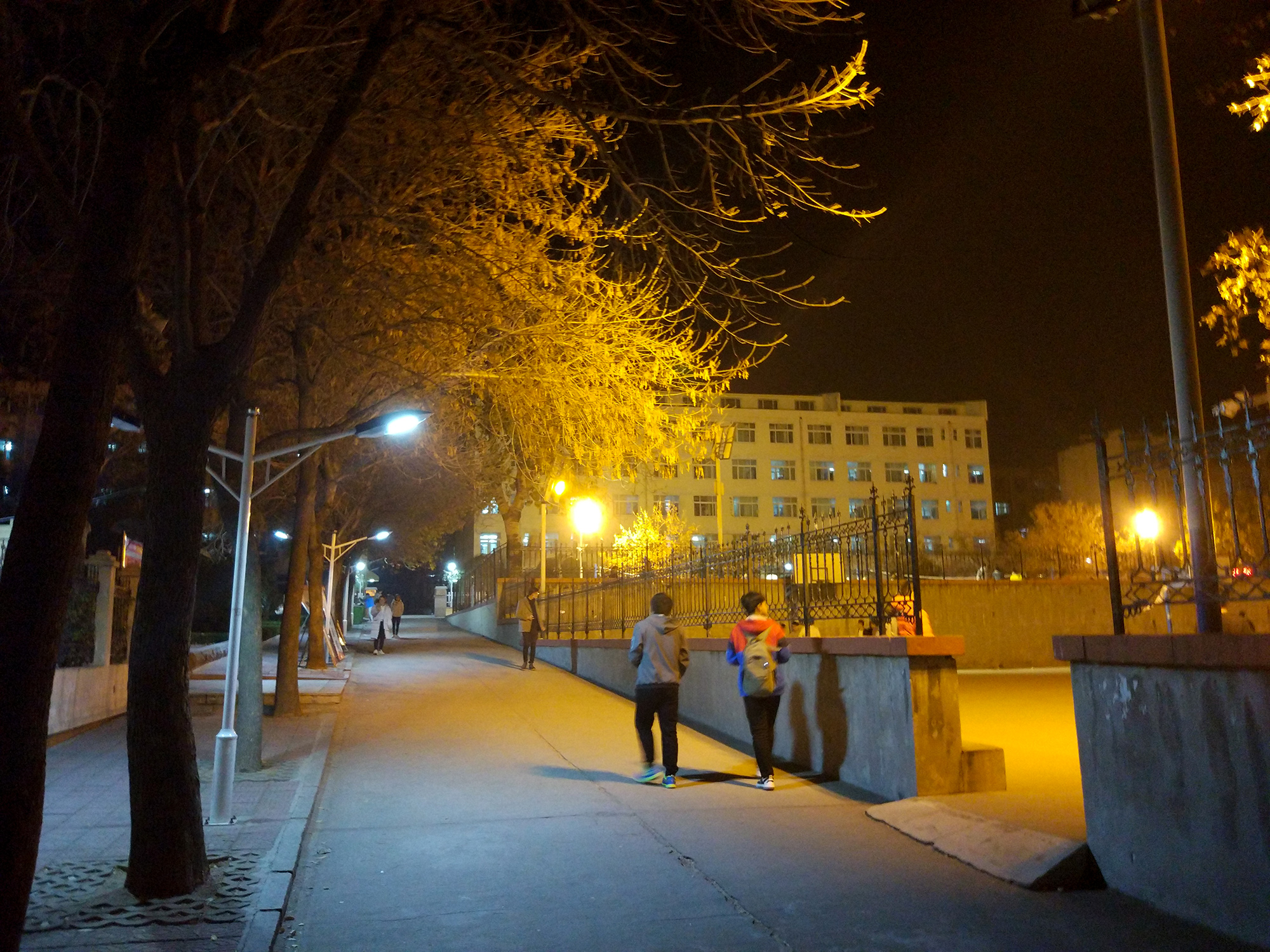
Shandong Agricultural University East Campus Basketball Court

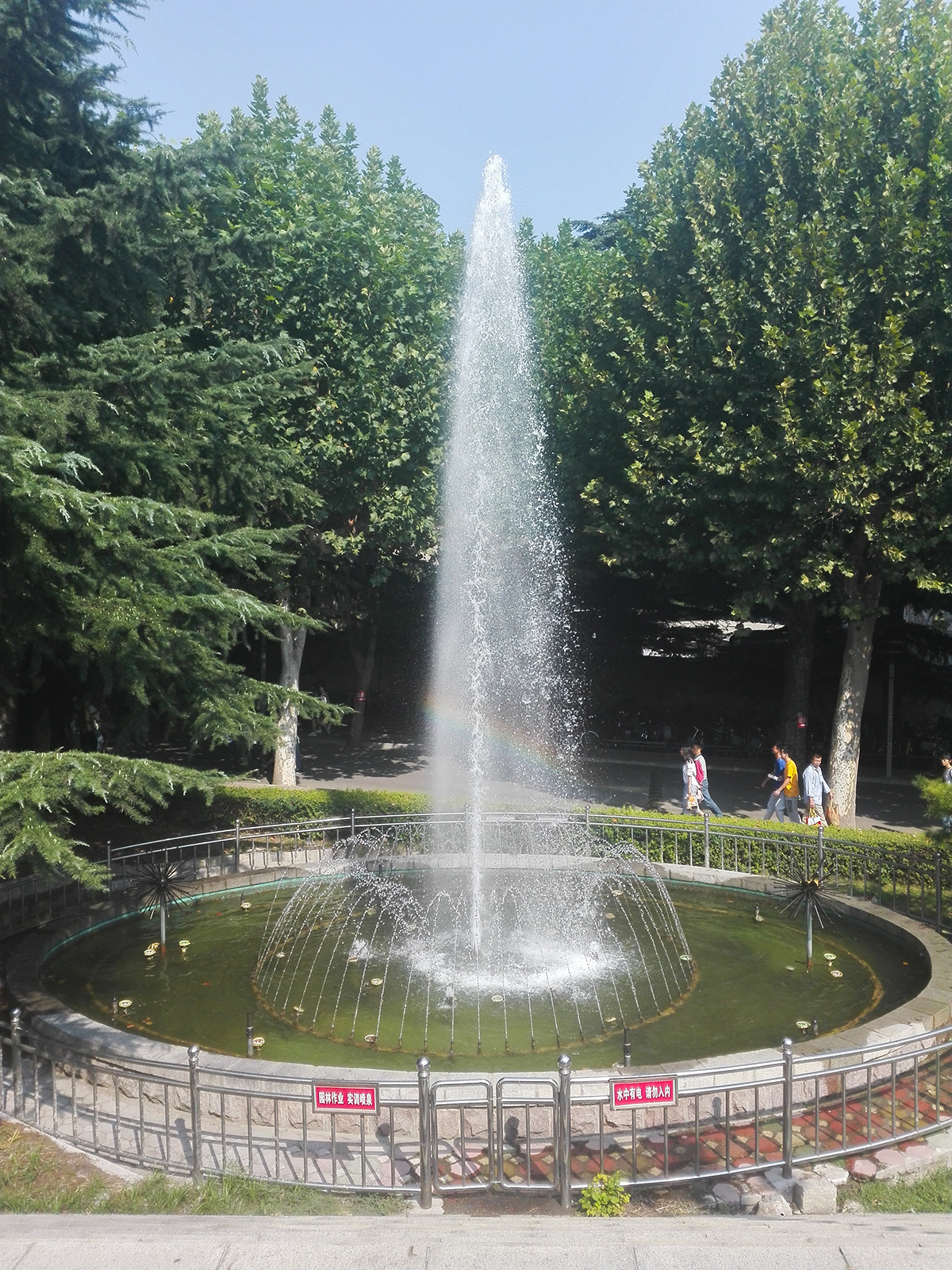
East Campus Fountain

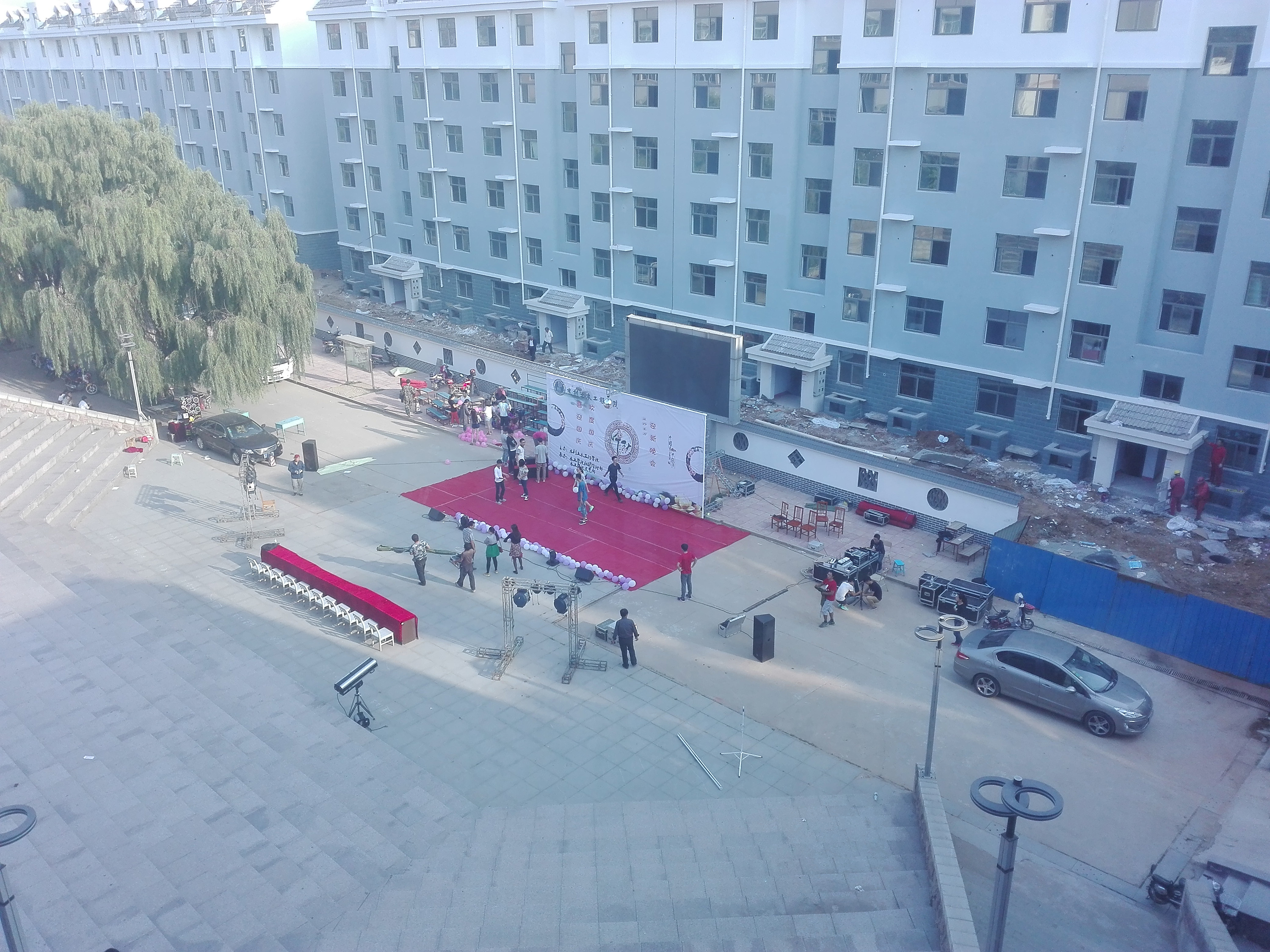
East Campus Youth Square

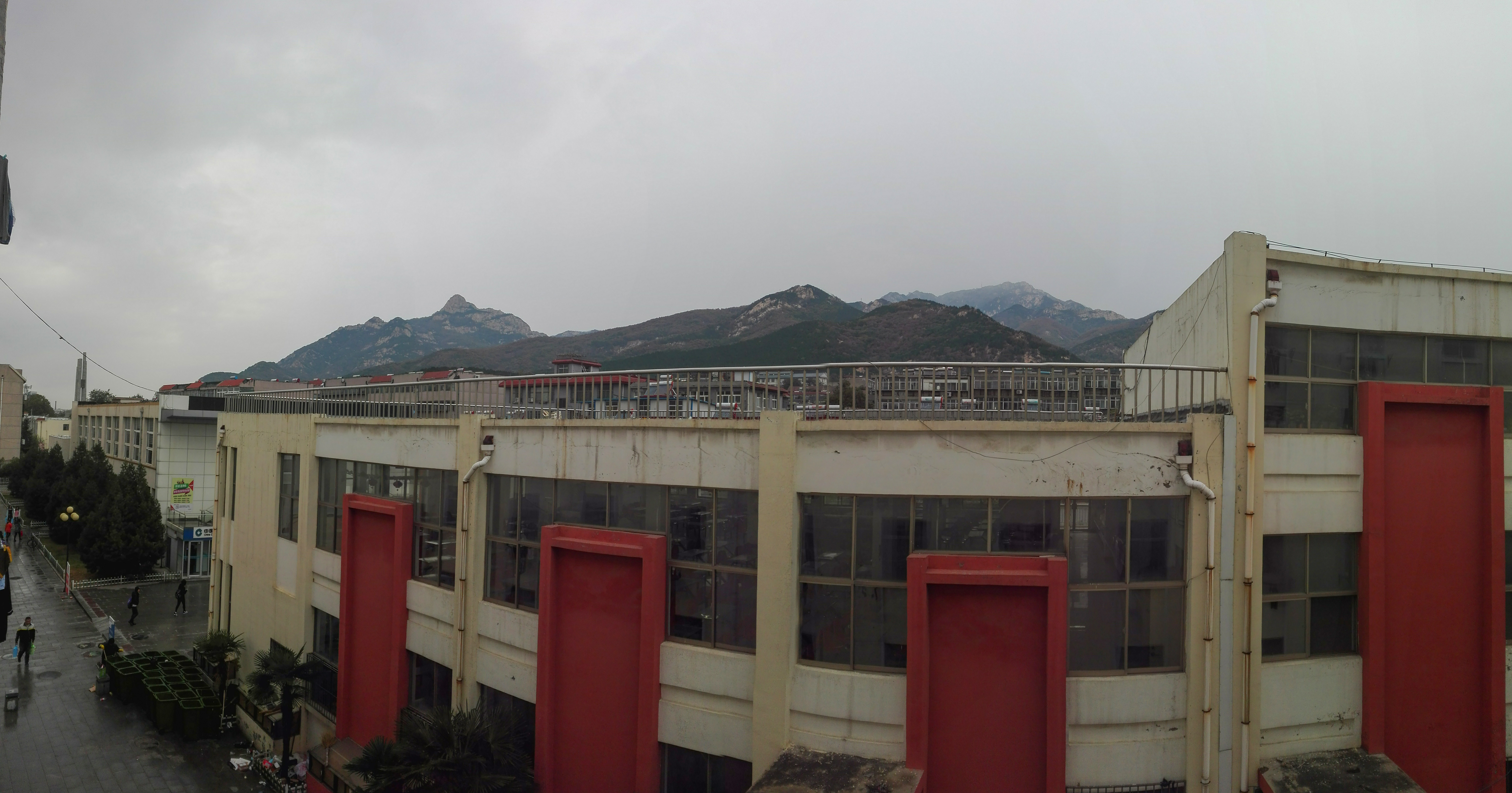
A panoramic view of the East Campus cafeteria, taken in 2015, with Mount Tai in the distance.
