= Li Zhensheng (geneticist) =

Chinese geneticist (born 1931)

Li Zhensheng 李振声
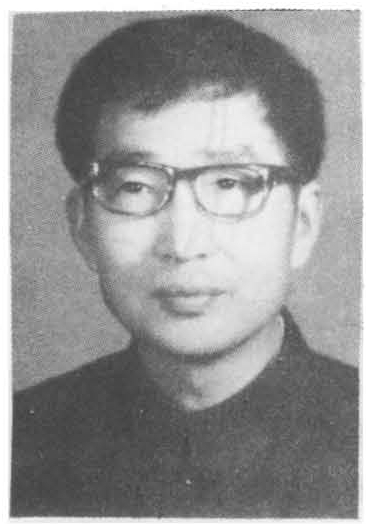
- Born: February 25, 1931 (age 95); Zibo, Shandong, China
- Education: Shandong Agricultural University
- Known for: wheat breeding through distant hybridization
- Awards: State Preeminent Science and Technology Award (2006)
- Scientific career
- Fields: Genetics

Li Zhensheng (Chinese: 李振声; pinyin: Lǐ Zhènshēng; born February 25, 1931) is a Chinese geneticist who specializes in the genetics of wheat. He is an academician of the Chinese Academy of Sciences and was awarded the Highest Science and Technology Award in 2006. Li was bestowed the Medal of the Republic, the highest honorary medal of the People's Republic of China, in September 2024.

== Biography ==
Mr. Li was born in Zibo, Shandong. In 1951, he graduated from Shandong Agricultural University and worked in Yangling (Institute of Soil and Water Conservation, Chinese Academy of Sciences, now Northwest A&F University) for over 30 years.

In an interview, he said that three scientists influenced him very much, they are Hua Luogeng (for telling him how to learn), Qian Sanqiang (how to do research) and Ai Siqi (Historical Materialism and Dialectical Materialism).

== Work ==
In Li's scientific career, he has made three notable contributions to wheat genetics and wide-hybridization between common wheat and Thinopyrum ponticum. The wheat cultivars have greatly enhanced productivity of wheat. Among them, Xiaoyan 6 has been widely grown in China. This has enabled him to propose a creative methodology for producing wheat substitution lines through nullisomic backcrossing. This kind of breeding needs less natural resources, and it protects the environment which is good for the sustainable development in Chinese agriculture.

== Awards and honors ==
- In 1983, First-class Prize of Sci-tech Advance Award by the People's Government of Shanxi province of China
- In 1985, First-class Prize of National Invention by the Ministry of Science and Technology of China
- In 1988, Tan Kah Kee Prize in Agricultural Science by Tan Kah Kee Foundation
- In 1990, Fellow, the Third World Academy of Sciences
- In 1978, National Scientific Conference Prize
- In 1979, National model worker
- In 1993, Academician, Chinese Academy of Sciences
- In 1995, Ho Leung Ho Lee Sci-tech Prize in Agricultural Science, awarded by Ho Leung Ho Lee Foundation in Hong Kong
- In 2005, China Agriculture Elite Award by the Ministry of Agriculture of China
- In 2006, Li won the Highest Science and Technology Award of China.
- In 2010, asteroid 90825 Lizhensheng, discovered by the Beijing Schmidt CCD Asteroid Program in 1995, was named in his honor. The official naming citation was published by the Minor Planet Center on September 23, 2010 (M.P.C. 72200).
