= Min Enze =

Chinese chemist (1924–2016)

- 闵恩泽
- Born: 4 February 1924; Chengdu, Sichuan, China
- Died: 7 March 2016 (aged 92); Beijing, China
- Education: National Central University; Ohio State University
- Spouse: Lu Wanzhen (m. 1950)
- Awards: Highest Science and Technology Award (2007)
- Scientific career
- Fields: Petrochemical catalysis

Min Enze (simplified Chinese: 闵恩泽; traditional Chinese: 閔恩澤; pinyin: Mǐn Ēnzé; 4 February 1924 – 7 March 2016) was a Chinese chemical engineer and chemist. He was an expert in petrochemical catalysis, and an academician of the Chinese Academy of Sciences (CAS) and the Chinese Academy of Engineering (CAE).

== Biography ==
Min was born in Chengdu, Sichuan, China. He graduated from National Central University (Nanjing University) in 1946, majoring in chemical engineering.

In 1951, Min obtained his doctor's degree from Ohio State University in the United States. He worked for National Aluminate Corporation between 1951 and 1955. He returned to China in August 1955 after the Korean War ended and was assigned work at Beijing Institute of Oil Refining (now Institute of Petrochemical Science of China Petroleum and Chemical Corporation). Min was elected an academician of CAS in 1980, a member of Third World Academy of Sciences (TWAS) in 1993, and an academician of the Chinese Academy of Engineering in 1994. He served as the chairman of academic committee of the Institute of Petrochemical Science of China Petroleum and Chemical Corporation (Sinopec).

Min received the Highest Science and Technology Award in 2007, the most prestigious scientific prize awarded in China.

Min died on 7 March 2016 at the age of 92 in Beijing.

Asteroid 30991 Minenze is named in his honor.

== Sources ==
- Min Enze
- Chemistry World
