= Yan Su =

- 阎肃
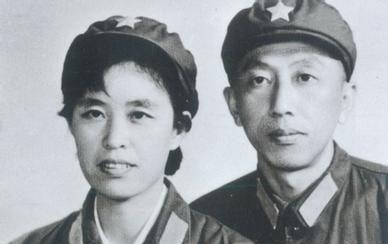
- Yan Su (right) and his wife, Li Wenhui (left)
- Born: Yan Zhiyang (阎志扬); May 9, 1930; Baoding, Hebei, China
- Died: February 12, 2016 (aged 85); Beijing, China
- Education: Chongqing Nankai School; Chongqing University
- Occupations: Lyricist, military officer
- Years active: 1953–2016
- Spouse: Li Wenhui (m. 1961)
- Children: 2
- Musical career
- Genres: Ethnic music, military song

Chinese name
- Traditional Chinese: 閻肅
- Simplified Chinese: 阎肃
Transcriptions
Standard Mandarin
- Hanyu Pinyin: Yán Sù

Yan Su (Chinese: 阎肃; 9 May 1930 – 12 February 2016) was a Chinese playwright and lyricist who served as vice-president of China Theatre Association. He held the civilian rank equivalent to general in the PLA Air Force Political Department Song and Dance Troupe. He was a National Class-A Screenwriter. He was a member of China Writers Association and China Music Copyright Association. He was a visiting professor at Heibei Institute of Communications.

== Biography ==
Yan Su was born Yan Zhiyang (阎志扬) in Baoding, Hebei, on May 9, 1930. During the Second Sino-Japanese War, he, then 10 years old, moved to Chongqing with his family. He attended Chongqing Nankai Secondary School and graduated from Chongqing University, majoring in business administration.

He joined the Communist Youth League during the Chinese Civil War and joined the Chinese Communist Party in 1953. In 1950, he was transferred to Southwest Military Region Youth Song and Dance Troupe as an actor. He once performed in the front of Korean War. In 1955 he was transferred again to PLA Air Force Political Department Song and Dance Troupe.

He first rose to prominence in 1964 for playing in the opera Sister Jiang, earned critical acclaim, and he was personally interviewed by Chairman Mao Zedong. But two years later, in the Cultural Revolution, the song was labeled as "poisonous weed" and he was cast as a rightist.

In 1982, Journey to the West was broadcast on China Central Television (CCTV), the series reached number one in the ratings when it aired in China. The opening theme, Dare to Ask Where is the Road, was written by Yan Su. In 1986 he joined the China Writers Association.

In 2015, he was elected "moved China" Person of the Year 2015. On October 27, 2015, a military vocalist Yu Wenhua (于文华) made up a rumor on Sinaweibo - "Teacher Yan Su died of illness at PLA Air Force General Hospital in Beijing". Later, Yan's wife Li Wenhui said in an interview that her husband is alive and they will investigate the legal responsibility of the rumormonger. "My father has been into a deep coma after acute cerebral infarction for more than twenty days, at present, his situation is stable, it's fair to say that he had the potential to wake up, but risk is often with opportunities, thank you for asking." Yan Yu, son of Yan Su, said in response to questions from journalists. On February 12, 2016, Yan Su died at the General Hospital of the People's Liberation Army Air Force, in Beijing. At the time of his death, he was set to judge a CCTV talent show and art advisor of the CCTV New Year's Gala.

On January 7, 2018, unable to reach an agreement on the proportion of the income distribution of Yan Su's music copyright, Yan's wife and daughter sued his son to the court for property analysis of the music copyright enjoyed by the heir, ordering his wife to enjoy two-thirds and his daughter to enjoy one-sixth.

== Personal life ==
Yan Su began dating Li Wenhui (李文辉) in 1959, they married in 1961, the couple have a son, Yan Yu (阎宇), and two grandsons.

== Works ==
=== Important works in lyrics ===
- Dare to Ask Where is the Road (敢问路在何方)
- Song Face Painting of Beijing Opera (说唱脸谱)
- Beijing Is the Hometown (故乡是北京)
- Folk Song Beijing Life Style Life Used to Be (前门情思大碗茶)
- Smoke and Mirrors (雾里看花)
- My Love to the Blue Sky of Motherland (我爱祖国的蓝天)
- Going To Sichuan (下四川)
- Oriental Pearl Tower (东方明珠)
- Great Wall Great (长城长)
- I Am the Sky (我就是天空)
- Guilin is My Home (桂林是我家)
- Face Changing (变脸)
- Everything Goes Well (万事如意)
- Mission (天职)
- Celebrating the New Year in the Army (连队里过大年)

=== Opera ===
- Sister Jiang (江姐)
- Daughter of the Party (党的女儿)
- Special District Rondo (特区回旋曲)
- Memories of Mother (忆娘)
- Three Chrysanthemum of Jiaodong (胶东三菊)
- Fourth Sister Liu (刘四姐)

=== Beijing opera ===
- Red Rock (红岩)
- The Red Detachment of Women (红色娘子军)
- May There Be Surplus Year After Year (年年有余)
- Armed Working Team Behind Enemy Lines (敌后武工队)
- Red Light (红灯照)

== Awards ==
Year	Title	Award	Result	Notes
1964	My Love to the Blue Sky of Motherland; Going To Sichuan	3rd PLA Arts Festival–Creative Excellence Award	Won	
1977	Sister Jiang	4th PLA Arts Festival–Creative Excellence Award	Won	
1979	Memories of Mother; Red Light	30th Anniversary of the Founding of the People's Republic–First Prize for Writing	Won	
	Great Wall Great	Audience Special Award for Favorite Military Song in the 1990s	Won	
	I Am the Sky	6th PLA Arts Festival–Creative Excellence Award	Won	
	Guilin is My Home; Face Changing	"Five-one Project" Award	Won	
	Smoke and Mirrors	Audience Award for Favorite Song on TV in the 1990s	Won	
	Everything Goes Well	1995 CCTV New Year's Gala–First Prize	Won	
	Celebrating the New Year in the Army	2002 CCTV New Year's Gala–Audience Award for Favorite Work	Won	
	Mission	2nd Military Song Gold Award	Won	
