= Shi Changxu =

Chinese metallurgist (1920–2014)

- 师昌绪
- Born: 15 November 1918; Xushui County, Zhili, Republic of China
- Died: November 10, 2014 (aged 95); Beijing, People's Republic of China
- Education: Northwestern Polytechnical University; Missouri School of Mines and Metallurgy; University of Notre Dame
- Awards: Highest Science and Technology Award (2010)
- Scientific career
- Fields: Materials science
- Workplaces: Chinese Academy of Sciences

Chinese name
- Simplified Chinese: 师昌绪
- Traditional Chinese: 師昌緒
Transcriptions
Standard Mandarin
- Hanyu Pinyin: Shī Chāngxù

Shi Changxu (Chinese: 师昌绪; 15 November 1920 – 10 November 2014) was a Chinese metallurgist. He served as vice president of the Chinese Academy of Engineering.

== Biography ==
Born in Xushui County, Zhili (now Baoding, Hebei), he attended National Northwestern Engineering Institute (a predecessor of Northwestern Polytechnical University) until 1945. He then studied for his master's degree in the United States, at the Missouri School of Mines and Metallurgy, before receiving a doctoral degree in 1952 from the University of Notre Dame. Shi was a recipient of the 2010 Highest Science and Technology Award. He died in Beijing at the age of 93 in 2014.

The asteroid 28468 Shichangxu, discovered in 2000, is named after him.

In 2015, he was honored as one of the "Top Ten People Touching China in 2014".

== Honours ==
- 1980 Member of the Chinese Academy of Sciences (CAS)
- 1994 Member of the Chinese Academy of Engineering (CAE)
- 1995 Fellow of The World Academy of Sciences (TWAS)

== Awards ==
- 1982 State Natural Science Award (Third Class)
- 1987 State Natural Science Award (Third Class)
- 1988 State Science and Technology Progress Award (First Class)
- 1988 State Science and Technology Progress Award (Second Class)
- 2010 Highest Science and Technology Award
