= Bai Fangli =

Chinese pedicab driver and philanthropist

- Bai Fangli
- Born: Bai Fangli; 23 May 1913; Cang County, Cangzhou, Hebei, China
- Died: 23 September 2005 (aged 92); Tianjin, China
- Occupation: Rickshaw driver

Bai Fangli (Chinese: 白方礼; pinyin: Bái Fānglǐ) was a Chinese pedicab driver in Tianjin who donated 350,000 yuan (US$54,958 in 2015) over a span of 18 years to enable more than 300 poor students to continue with their studies.

== Background ==
Bai Fangli was born in Hebei and lived with his wife and his daughter, Bai Jinfeng.

== Charity work ==
In 1986–1987, at the age of 74, Bai retired from his pedicab driving job and returned to his hometown in Hebei Province, where he decided to live the rest of his life. On his way back, he witnessed many children working in the field. Upon learning that they had to drop out of school due to financial difficulties, he decided to go back to his job of driving a pedicab in Tianjin to support the children in receiving education. However, before returning to work, he first donated 5,000 yuan for the cause of their fees. Until 2001, he often worked for long shifts, sometimes 24 hours at a stretch, so that he could make the money to pay the installment for the school fee. He got an accommodation close to the railway and would wait 24 hours a day, eat simple food, and wore secondhand discarded clothes. He also lived in a shabby house in the outskirts of Tianjin and ate humble food, according to local media. In 1996, he opened a small store near Tianjin's railway station to make more money. Most of his income was donated to local schools and universities, such as Nankai University, where he donated 35,000 yuan (US$5,498 in 2015) for the first time in 1996. His entire contribution summed up to 350,000 yuan. In 2001, at the age of nearly 90, he paid his last installment to the Yaohua High School and retired from his job.

== Illness and death ==
In May 2005, Bai was sent to a hospital, where he was found to have lung cancer. He had been in a deep coma for about 20 days prior. His health eventually worsened, and he died in that same year at the age of 92.

== Legacy ==
In 2004, he was chosen by China Central Television (CCTV) as one of the 20 candidates for the "10 people who touched China's heart" selection.

After hearing that Bai was seriously ill, Nankai University students folded 99 paper cranes in early September 2005 to pray for him.
