= Death of Li Jianying =

Li Jianying
- Born: May 1964; Zhengzhou, Henan, China
- Died: November 4, 2006 (aged 42); China
- Military career
- Allegiance: China
- Branch: People's Liberation Army Air Force
- Service years: 1982-2006
- Rank: Air Force Colonel
- Awards: Gold Medal for Pilots

Li Jianying (Chinese: 李剑英; pinyin: Lǐ Jiànyīng; May 1964 – November 4, 2006) was a People's Liberation Army Air Force pilot. Li chose to sacrifice himself in a crash landing rather than bail out and leave his plane to possibly plow into a village.

Li was born in Zhengzhou, Henan in 1964. He was known for his toughness and work ethic. He joined the army in 1982, and was a colonel and first-class pilot before his death. During his 22-year flying career, Li flew 5,003 times registering 2,389 hours of safe flights, and was awarded third- and second-class honors.

On November 14, 2006, Li Jianying was flying over an area containing seven villages, 814 households, an express toll station and a tile workshop when his fighter jet ran into a flock of pigeons. His jet had over 800 liters of aviation oil, more than 120 shells, a rocket, and explosive oxygen cylinders. Li knew that if he ejected, the jet would go out of control and possibly kill people. He radioed in that he was going to attempt a forced landing. He tried to set down on a river bank, but his jet exploded on impact and he was killed.

He was posthumously awarded a first-class merit and a gold medal for pilots, the highest honor for a pilot. In 2008, he was tied for first place in CCTV's "China's 10 Most Moving People of 2007" award.
