= Jing Yidan =

Chinese television host (1955–2026)

- 敬一丹
- Born: 27 April 1955; Harbin, Heilongjiang, China
- Died: 13 September 2026 (aged 71)
- Education: Communication University of China
- Occupation: Host
- Years active: 1979–2015
- Known for: Focus Report
- Television: China Central Television (CCTV)
- Spouse: Wang Zimu (m. 1985)
- Awards: Golden Mike Award; 1993; Golden Mike Award; 1995; Golden Mike Award; 1997

Jing Yidan (Chinese: 敬一丹; pinyin: Jìng Yīdān; 27 April 1955 – 13 September 2026) was a Chinese television host. She won China's Golden Mike Award in 1993, 1995 and 1997. Jing was the vice-president of the China Association of Radio and Television and was a delegate to the 9th National People's Congress.

== Early life and career ==
Jing Yidan was born in Harbin, Heilongjiang in April 1955. During the Down to the Countryside Movement, she worked in countryside as a Sent-down youth. After the Cultural Revolution, she returned to Heilongjiang. After graduating from Communication University of China in 1979 she was assigned to Long Guang as a news anchor.

Jing joined the China Central Television in 1988, she hosted Focus Report and Oriental Horizon.

== Personal life and death ==
In October 1985, Jing Yidan was married to Wang Zimu (王梓木), who was a graduate of Tsinghua University.

On 13 September 2026, her family released a notice of death, stating that Jing Yidan had been treated for cerebral hemorrhage in both Harbin and Beijing in June 2026 and died on the same day. She was 71.

== Works ==
=== Television ===
- Focus Report (Chinese: 焦点访谈)
- Oriental Horizon (Chinese: 东方时空)

== Awards ==
- 1993 Golden Mike Award
- 1995 Golden Mike Award
- 1997 Golden Mike Award
