= Liu Dongsheng =

Chinese geologist (1917–2008)

- 刘东生
- Born: 22 November 1917; Shenyang, Liaoning, Republic of China
- Died: 6 March 2008 (aged 90); Beijing, People's Republic of China
- Education: National Southwestern Associated University; National Central University
- Awards: Highest Science and Technology Award (2003)
- Scientific career
- Fields: Geology
- Workplaces: Chinese Academy of Sciences

Chinese name
- Simplified Chinese: 刘东生
- Traditional Chinese: 劉東生
Transcriptions
Standard Mandarin
- Hanyu Pinyin: Liú Dōngshēng
- Wade–Giles: Liu Tung-sheng

Liu Dongsheng (Chinese: 刘东生; 1917–2008), or Tung-sheng Liu, was a Chinese geologist. He was a well known researcher in the fields of paleontology, Quaternary geology and environmental geology.

He graduated from department of geology of National Southwestern Associated University in 1942 and studied at department biology of National Central University (Nanjing University) from 1946 to 1949.

He was a professor at the department of Chemistry, Tsinghua University, Beijing. He was a research fellow at Institute of Vertebrate Paleontology and Paleoanthropology, and then Institute of Geology and Geophysics, Chinese Academy of Sciences.

Liu was elected an academician of the Chinese Academy of Sciences (CAS) in 1980, and a member of the Third World Academy of Sciences (TWAS) in 1991. In 2002, he was the recipient of Tyler Prize for Environmental Achievement. In 2003, Liu received the State Preeminent Science and Technology Award, the highest scientific prize awarded in China.

== Legacy ==
Since 2011 the Liu Tungsheng Distinguished Career Medal has been awarded quadrennially to "a senior Quaternary scientist who has made significant and distinguished contributions that have advanced Quaternary science through dedicated service to the international community", by the International Union for Quaternary Research.
