= Du Yubo =

Chinese politician

- 杜玉波

Vice Chairperson of the Education, Science, Culture and Public Health Committee of the 13th National People's Congress
- In office March 2018 – September 2024
- Chairperson: Li Xueyong

Vice Minister of Education
- In office December 2010 – October 2016
- Minister: Yuan Guiren; Chen Baosheng

Communist Party Secretary of Beihang University
- In office January 2002 – January 2011
- President: Li Wei; Huai Jinpeng
- Preceded by: Lou Shili
- Succeeded by: Hu Lingyun

Personal details
- Born: September 1955 (age 71) Jin County, Hebei, China
- Party: Chinese Communist Party (1975–2025; expelled)
- Education: Beijing Institute of Technology; Central Party School of the Chinese Communist Party

Du Yubo (Chinese: 杜玉波; pinyin: Dù Yùbō; born September 1955) is a former Chinese politician who served as vice minister of education from 2010 to 2016. He was investigated by China's top anti-graft agency in September 2024.

Du was a representative of the 18th National Congress of the Chinese Communist Party. He was a delegate to the 13th National People's Congress and a member of the Standing Committee of the 13th National People's Congress. He was a member of the 11th National Committee of the Chinese People's Political Consultative Conference.

== Early life and education ==
Du was born in Jin County (now Jinzhou), Hebei, in September 1956. In 1975, he enrolled at Beijing Institute of Technology, where he majored in optical instrument structure.

== Career ==
Du entered the workforce in February 1974, and joined the Chinese Communist Party (CCP) in June 1975.

After graduating in 1978, he stayed at the university and worked successively as secretary of league general branch, league secretary, head of the Organization Department, deputy party secretary, vice president, and executive deputy party secretary.

In January 2002, Du was appointed party secretary of Beihang University, a position at vice-ministerial level. He took up the post of vice minister of education which he held only from 2010 to 2016, although he remained party secretary of Beihang University until January 2011.

In 2018, Du became deputy director of the Education, Science, Culture and Public Health Committee of the 13th National People's Congress, and served until 2023.

== Downfall ==
On 18 September 2024, Du was put under investigation for alleged "serious violations of discipline and laws" by the Central Commission for Discipline Inspection (CCDI), the party's internal disciplinary body, and the National Supervisory Commission, the highest anti-corruption agency of China.

On 2 March 2025, Du was stripped of his posts within the CCP and his entitlements were canceled. On June 18, he was indicted on suspicion of accepting bribes. On November 26, he was sentenced to 15 years in prison for taking nearly 68 million yuan ($9.6 million) in bribes and fined of 6 million yuan ($850,000 million) by the Linfen Intermediate People's Court in Shanxi province.

Party political offices
Preceded by Lou Shili (楼士礼)	Communist Party Secretary of Beihang University; 2002–2011	Succeeded by Hu Lingyun (胡凌云)
Non-profit organization positions
Preceded by Qu Zhenyuan (瞿振元)	President of the China Association of Higher Education; 2017–2024	Succeeded by TBA
