= Ye Duzheng =

Chinese meteorologist (1916–2013)

- 叶笃正
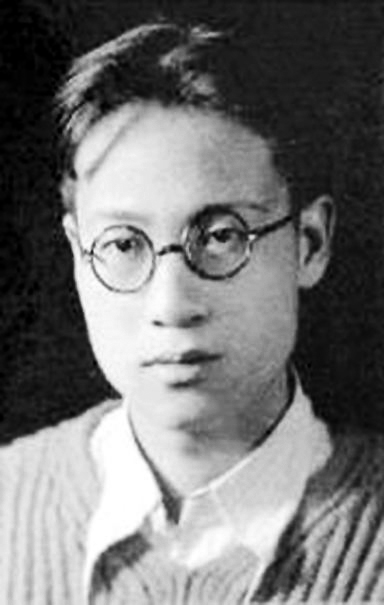
- Ye Duzheng
- Born: 21 February 1916; Tianjin, Republic of China
- Died: 16 October 2013 (aged 97); Beijing, People's Republic of China
- Education: National Southwestern Associated University; Zhejiang University; University of Chicago
- Spouse: Feng Huideng
- Awards: Highest Science and Technology Award (2005)
- Scientific career
- Fields: Meteorology
- Workplaces: Institute of Atmospheric Physics

Chinese name
- Simplified Chinese: 叶笃正
- Traditional Chinese: 葉篤正
Transcriptions
Standard Mandarin
- Hanyu Pinyin: Yè Dúzhèng
- Wade–Giles: Yeh Tu-cheng

Ye Duzheng (Chinese: 叶笃正; 21 February 1916 – 16 October 2013) was a Chinese meteorologist and academician at the Chinese Academy of Sciences.

Born in Anqing, Anhui province in 1916, Ye is considered the founder of Chinese atmospheric physics, and was awarded the State Preeminent Science and Technology Award in 2005 by Chinese President Hu Jintao, which is the nation's highest scientific prize.

== Career ==
From 1935 to 1941, Ye studied at Tsinghua University, Beijing. From 1941 to 1943, he did his graduate study (M.Sc.) at Zhejiang University, Hangzhou. From 1943 to 1944, he was a research assistant at the Meteorological Institute, Academia Sinica, Chongqing (war-period capital of China).

In 1945–1948, Ye studied at University of Chicago, and obtained his PhD there (under Carl-Gustaf Rossby). From 1947 to 1950, he was a researcher at University of Chicago. From 1950 to 1966, he served as a division director and professor at the Institute of Geophysics, Chinese Academy of Sciences.

From 1966 until his death, he was the chief director and later the honorary director of the Institute of Atmospheric Physics, Chinese Academy of Science (IAP/CAS). In 1981–1984, he was the vice-president of Chinese Academy of Sciences. From 1984 till his death, he was also an advisor of Chinese Academy of Science.

In 1978–1986, Ye was the president of Chinese Meteorological Society. In 1982–1988, he was the chairman of the Chinese National Committee for the World Climate Research Programme (WCRP). In 1987–1991, he was the chairman of the Chinese National Committee for International Union of Geodesy and Geophysics (IUGG). In 1987–1993, he was the chairman of the Chinese National Committee for the International Geosphere-Biosphere Programme (IGBP).

He died on 16 October 2013.

== Membership ==
- 1980, Member, Chinese Academy of Sciences
- 1981, Foreign Member, Finnish Academy of Science and Letters, Finland
- 1982, Honorary Member, Royal Meteorological Society, UK
- 1990, Honorary Member, American Meteorological Society, USA
- 1982–1988, Member, Joint Scientific Committee/World Climate Research Programme (JSC/WCRP)
- 1983–1987, Member, International Association of Meteorology and Atmospheric Physics (IAMAP) Executive Committee
- 1987–1990, Member, International Geosphere-Biosphere Programme (SC-IGBP)
- 1987–1995, Member, International Union of Geodesy and Geophysics (IUGG) Bureau

== Honours and awards ==
- 2003 Awarded the International Meteorological Organization Prize from the World Meteorological Organization.

Cultural offices
Preceded by Gu Zhenchao	Director of the Institute of Atmospheric Physics; 1978–1981	Succeeded by Tao Shiyan
Preceded by Zhao Jiuzhang	President of China Meteorological Society; 1978–1986	Succeeded by Tao Shiyan
