= International Society for Rock Mechanics =

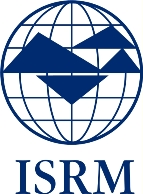
ISRM Logo

The International Society for Rock Mechanics - ISRM was founded in Salzburg in 1962 as a result of the enlargement of the "Salzburger Kreis". Its foundation is mainly owed to Prof. Leopold Müller who acted as President of the Society until September 1966. The ISRM is a non-profit scientific association supported by the fees of the members and grants that do not impair its free action. In 2021 the Society had 6,800 members and 49 National Groups.

The field of Rock Mechanics is taken to include all studies relative to the physical and mechanical behaviour of rocks and rock masses and the applications of this knowledge for the better understanding of geological processes and in the fields of Engineering.

The main objectives and purposes of the Society are:

- to encourage international collaboration and exchange of ideas and information between Rock Mechanics practitioners;
- to encourage teaching, research, and advancement of knowledge in Rock Mechanics;
- to promote high standards of professional practice among rock engineers so that civil, mining and petroleum engineering works might be safer, more economic and less disruptive to the environment.

The main activities carried out by the Society in order to achieve its objectives are:

- to hold International Congresses at intervals of four years;
- to sponsor International and Regional Symposia, organised by the National Groups the Society;
- to publish a News Journal to provide information about technology related to Rock Mechanics and up-to-date news on activities being carried out in the Rock Mechanics community;
- to operate Commissions for studying scientific and technical matters of concern to the Society;
- to award the Rocha Medal for an outstanding doctoral thesis, every year, and the Müller Award in recognition of distinguished contributions to the profession of Rock Mechanics and Rock Engineering, once every four years;
- to cooperate with other international scientific associations.

The Society is ruled by a Council, consisting of representatives of the National Groups, the Board and the Past Presidents. The current President is Prof. Resat Ulusay, from Turkey.

The ISRM Secretariat has been headquartered in Lisbon, Portugal, at the Laboratório Nacional de Engenharia Civil - LNEC since 1966, date of the first ISRM Congress, when Prof. Manuel Rocha was elected as President of the Society.

ISRM is a member of the Federation of International Geo-Engineering Societies.
