= 2023 in China =

- Decades: 2000s; 2010s; 2020s
- See also: Other events of 2023; History of China • Timeline • Years

Events that happened the year 2023 in China.

== Incumbents ==
- General Secretary of the Chinese Communist Party – Xi Jinping
- President – Xi Jinping
- Vice President
  - Wang Qishan (served until 10 March 2023)
  - Han Zheng (from 10 March 2023)
- Premier
  - Li Keqiang (served unitl 11 March 2023)
  - Li Qiang (from 11 March 2023)
- Congress chairman – Li Zhanshu
- Consultative Conference chairman – Wang Yang
- Supervision Commission director – Yang Xiaodu

== Events ==
- In 2023, the Communist Part of China established the Central Science and Technology Commission (CSTC), chaired by Ding Xuexiang, as a science, technology, and innovation policy body.
- 8 January – 17 people killed and 22 others injured when a truck hits a funeral procession in Nanchang County, Jiangxi.
- 11 January – 2023 Guangzhou car attack: Five people killed and 13 others injured when a man rams his vehicle into a crowd in Guangzhou, Guangdong.
- 17 January – 2023 Nyingchi avalanche: An avalanche in Nyingchi, Tibet, kills 28 people.
- 4 February – At least 16 people are killed and 66 others injured in a multiple-vehicle collision along a highway in Changsha, Hunan.
- 12 February – 2023 Shandong high-altitude object: China said that it detected an unidentified flying object over the Yellow Sea, and warns that it is prepared to shoot it down. The Qingdao Marine Development Bureau issues an alert to fishermen in the waters to be "on alert" and "avoid risks".
- 22 February – Alxa Left Banner mine collapse: 53 people are killed by a collapse at a coal mine in Alxa League, Inner Mongolia.
- April – India surpassed China as the world's most populous country.
- 19 April – 2023 Beijing hospital fire: Twenty-nine people killed by a fire in a hospital in Beijing.
- 13 May – Li Haoshi controversy
- 28 May – First flight of the Comac C919, China's first domestically made passenger aircraft, takes place between Shanghai Hongqiao Airport and Beijing Capital Airport.
- 4 June – 19 people are killed by a landslide at a mine in Leshan city of Sichuan.
- 21 June – 2023 Yinchuan gas explosion: At least 31 people are killed and seven injured by a gas explosion at a barbecue restaurant in the city of Yinchuan in the northwest Ningxia region. The explosion was caused by a leak in a liquefied gas tank inside the restaurant.
- 10 July – Six people, including three children, are killed and one injured in an early morning knife attack at a kindergarten in Lianjiang, Guangdong.
- 23 July – 2023 Qiqihar school gymnasium collapse: 11 people are killed by the collapse of a school gym in Qiqihar, Heilongjiang.
- 2 August – Typhoon Doksuri brings heavy rainfall to Beijing and Hebei. In Changping, it sets a maximum rainfall record since record-keeping began in 1883. At least 80 people are killed and 35 missing by flooding in localities of Beijing, Hebei, Jilin and Liaoning.
- 11 August – 24 people are killed and 3 are missing after a flash flood and landslides in the village of Weiziping in Chang'an, Xi'an.
- 8 September – Flooding occurs in Guangdong and Fujian province in southern China after Typhon Haikui makes landfall over the region. Rainfall in Shenzhen reaches record levels, the heaviest since meteorological records began in the city.
- 22 September – Syrian President Bashar al-Assad visits China, meets with Chinese leader Xi Jinping, and signs a strategic partnership with China on infrastructure as part of China's Belt and Road Initiative.
- 13 October – An Israeli diplomat based at the Embassy of Israel, Beijing is stabbed by an unknown foreign attacker. The diplomat was taken to a hospital for treatment and is in stable condition. The incident is being treated as a terrorist attack.
- 16 October
  - China will provide emergency humanitarian aid to the UN Palestine agency and the Palestinian Authority. The CIDCA says the aid will be used to address urgent needs, such as food and medical care.
  - Former Bank of China chair Liu Lian'ge is arrested on allegations of corruption.
- 17 October – Hungarian Prime Minister Viktor Orbán and Russian President Vladimir Putin hold talks at the Belt and Road Initiative forum in Beijing. It is the first meeting between Putin and an EU leader since Russia's invasion of Ukraine.
- 24 October – The Standing Committee of the National People's Congress of China votes to remove several SCtate Council members from their positions, including defense minister Li Shangfu, finance minister Liu Kun, and science minister Wang Zhigang.
- 10 November – China imposes "control measures" against Philippine vessels at a contested South China Sea location after a Philippine auxiliary ship entered the area which China deemed as infringing on its sovereignty.
- 13 November – 2023 Chinese pneumonia outbreak: National Health Commission reports a pneumonia outbreak in Beijing and Liaoning.
- 15 November – U.S. President Joe Biden and Xi Jinping hold talks in San Francisco, California, United States, their first meeting in over a year. The talks are described as being positive with "real progress" being made on key issues such as drug trafficking and artificial intelligence.
- 16 November – Lüliang office fire: At least 26 people are killed and 63 were hospitalized by a fire at the Yongju Coal Industry Joint Building in Lüliang, Shanxi.
- 21 November – The Chinese Foreign Ministry warns Argentina against severing ties as a "serious mistake", after president-elect Javier Milei vowed to do so.
- 27 November – A Chinese court commences compensation hearings for the Chinese relatives of passengers on Malaysia Airlines Flight 370.
- 6 December – Archaeologists discover an ancient Han dynasty tomb.
- 14 December – 2023 Beijing Subway collision: At least 515 people are injured in a rear-end collision between railroad cars on the Beijing Subway near the Xi'erqi station amid snowfall.
- 16 December
  - The China Meteorological Administration issues a low-temperature warning, forecasting a cold wave affecting most of the country.
  - A court in Baiyin, Gansu sentences five organizers of a 2021 ultramarathon to prison terms ranging from three to five and a half years, following the deaths of 21 runners due to extreme weather during the event.
- 18 December
  - Serial killer Lao Rongzhi is executed for the murders of seven people between 1996 and 1999.
  - 2023 Jishishan earthquake: At least 127 people are killed by a magnitude 6.2 earthquake in Gansu and Qinghai. Over 700 others are injured. It is China's deadliest earthquake in years.
- 20 December – Twelve people are killed and 13 others injured when a mining cart runs off the tracks in Jixi, Heilongjiang.
- 22 December – China passes a series of regulations aimed at limiting video game microtransactions. The new rules include banning rewards for logging on for multiple consecutive days and banning rewards for players if they spend money in a game for the first time.
- 29 December – The National People's Congress of China appoints commander of the People's Liberation Army Navy Dong Jun as the Minister of National Defense, succeeding Li Shangfu.

== Notable Deaths ==
- 1 January
  - Wei Lian, 77, film director.
  - Fan Weitang, 87, mining engineer.
  - Zhu Zushou, 77, diplomat, ambassador to Hungary (2003–2007) and the Netherlands (2001–2003).
  - Wang Hao, 92, military officer.
- 2 January
  - John Huo Cheng, 96, Roman Catholic prelate.
  - Hu Fuming, 87, scholar and politician.
  - Wang Zhiliang, 94, translator.
- 3 January
  - Zhao Qiguo, 92, soil scientist, member of the Chinese Academy of Sciences.
  - Zhou Lingzhao, 103, painter.
- 4 January
  - Wu Sheng, 88, nuclear engineer, member of the Chinese Academy of Engineering.
  - Xu Mi, 85, nuclear engineer, member of the Chinese Academy of Engineering.
  - Ge Xiurun, 88, engineer, member of the Chinese Academy of Engineering.
  - Lu Xiyan, 94, organic scientist, member of the Chinese Academy of Sciences.
- 5 January – Yang Fuyu, 95, biochemist, member of the Chinese Academy of Sciences.
- 8 January – Wu Tao, 82, diplomat, ambassador to Portugal (1992–1994), Russia (1998–2001) and Australia (2001–2003).
- 9 January – Zhang Jinlin, 86, engineer, member of the Chinese Academy of Engineering.
- 10 January – He Ping, 65, film director (Swordsmen in Double Flag Town, Sun Valley, Warriors of Heaven and Earth).
- 13 January – Mao Zhi, 90, engineer, member of the Chinese Academy of Engineering.
- 14 January – Qian Yitai, 82, chemist, member of the Chinese Academy of Sciences.
- 15 January – Chen Qizhi, 97, military officer and academic administrator, deputy (1975–1983) and president of NUDT (1990–1994).
- 16 January – Guo Hong'an, 79, translator.
- 17 January – Liang Jincai, 95, aerospace engineer, member of the Chinese Academy of Engineering.
- 20 January
  - Fang Zhiyuan, 83, engineer, member of the Chinese Academy of Engineering.
  - He Haoju, 100, politician, deputy (1983–1998).
- 23 January – Hu Guangzhen, 95, electronic engineer, member of the Chinese Academy of Engineering.
- 24 January – Li Zhao, 82, landmine expert, member of the Chinese Academy of Engineering.
- 26 January – Wang Wei, 85, physicist, member of the Chinese Academy of Sciences.
- 27 January
  - Li Wenjun, 92, translator.
  - Yang Yi, 103, literary translator.
- 30 January – Ouyang Pingkai, 77, engineer and academic administrator, president of Nanjing Tech University (2001–2012) and member of the Chinese Academy of Engineering.
- 5 February
  - Hsing Yun, 95, Buddhist monk, founder of Fo Guang Shan and Buddha's Light International Association.
  - Wu Zhongru, 83, hydraulic engineer, member of the Chinese Academy of Engineering.
- 13 February – Shi Zhongci, 89, mathematician, member of the Chinese Academy of Sciences.
- 27 October – Li Keqiang, 68, politician, premier (2013–2023), first vice premier (2008–2013).
- 2 November – Wei-Wei, 101, actress, (Night Inn, Spring in a Small Town) (1942–2023)
- 3 November – Zhou Tienong, 84, politician, (1998–)
- 10 December – Gao Yaojie, 95, gynecologist, AIDS activist.

== See also ==
=== Country overviews ===
- History of China
- History of modern China
- Outline of China
- Government of China
- Politics of China
- Timeline of Chinese history
- Years in China
