= Pan You =

Southern Tang politician (938–973)

Pan You (Chinese: 潘佑; 938–973) was a politician of the Southern Tang who was arrested by Li Yu and killed by hanging. Pan You was born in Youzhou, now modern Beijing.

During the Southern Tang there were many officials that tried to use the Rites of Zhou to reform the law but failed. Pan You was familiar with classics and history, including the works of Laozi and Zhuangzi. He enjoyed writing and once wrote a thousand word letter to the Southern Han. He authored the 10-volume work "Xingyang Collection" (滎陽集), which is now lost.

Li Yu, ruler of the Southern Tang, lived a luxurious life. During his reign, Pan You went to court seven times and was severely criticized for his writing on politics. During the decline of the Southern Tang, Pan's writings provoked the anger of Li Yu. As a result, Li Yu sent people to arrest and kill Pan You, poisoned Lin Renzhao, and Pan You died by hanging.

In 978, Li Yu confessed to killing Pan You.

Pan You's life was documented in Book of Southern Tang by Ma Ling, the 1184 Book of Southern Tang by Lu You, the 1343 History of Song and Volume 4 of the Junzhai Chronicle (郡斋读书志).

Pan was ugly and got divorced.

== See also ==
- Pan Shusi
