= Li Zhao =

Li Zhao, may refer to:

- Li Zhao (Tang dynasty), Tang dynasty politician and historian.
- Li Zhao (military engineer), Chinese engineer, member of the Chinese Academy of Engineering
