= Book of Southern Tang =

Book of Southern Tang (南唐書; Nantang Shu) could refer to one of three ancient Chinese historiography books on the history of Southern Tang (937–975):

- Book of Southern Tang (Ma Ling book) (1105)
- Book of Southern Tang (Lu You book) (1184)
- Book of Southern Tang, by Hu Hui (胡恢), mentioned in a 1701 book but no longer extant

== See also ==
- Book of Tang (disambiguation)
