= Yu Shuhong =

Chinese chemist

- 俞书宏
- Born: August 1967 (age 59); Lujiang County, Anhui, China
- Education: Hefei University of Technology; University of Science and Technology of China
- Scientific career
- Fields: Materials science
- Workplaces: University of Science and Technology of China
- Doctoral advisor: Qian Yitai

Chinese name
- Traditional Chinese: 俞書宏
- Simplified Chinese: 俞书宏
Transcriptions
Standard Mandarin
- Hanyu Pinyin: Yú Shūhóng

Yu Shuhong (Chinese: 俞书宏; born August 1967) is a Chinese chemist and materials scientist and professor at the University of Science and Technology of China.

== Early life and education ==
Yu was born in Lujiang County, Anhui in August 1967. In July 1988 he graduated from Hefei University of Technology. He received his master's degree from Shanghai Research institute of Chemical Industry and in 1991, and completed his doctoral work in 1998 at the University of Science and Technology of China under the supervision of Qian Yitai.

== Career ==
In 1999 he became researcher at the Laboratory of Materials and Structures, Tokyo University of Technology. In 2001 he became researcher at the Max Planck Institute of Colloids and Interfaces in Potsdam. Yu returned to China in 2002 and that same year became doctoral supervisor at the University of Science and Technology of China.

== Honours and awards ==
- 2001 State Natural Science Award (Second Class)
- 2003 Distinguished Young Scholar by the National Science Fund
- 2006 "Chang Jiang Scholar" (or "Yangtze River Scholar")
- 2013 Fellow of the Royal Society of Chemistry
- November 22, 2019 Member of the Chinese Academy of Sciences (CAS)
