= 2023 Ohio pneumonia outbreak =

Ongoing outbreak of mycoplasma pneumonia in Ohio

- Disease: Mycoplasma pneumonia
- Location: Ohio

In late 2023, an outbreak of mycoplasma pneumonia occurred in Ohio in the United States, primarily affecting children. Despite it occurring around the same time, experts say that it is unrelated to the 2023 Chinese pneumonia outbreak. The average age of children affected is eight years old, with some cases being as young as three. As of December 1, 2023, investigation as to the cause is still ongoing.

== Timeline ==
=== November 2023 ===
On November 30, Warren County, Ohio reported an unusually high number of pediatric pneumonia cases, reporting 142 cases since August.

=== December 2023 ===
On December 1, former Centers for Disease Control and Prevention director Tom Frieden said that the outbreak could have been the result of an "immunity gap" caused by the COVID-19 lockdowns, leaving people more susceptible to infections by Influenza, Respiratory syncytial virus, and COVID-19.
