= Book of Tang =

Book of Tang may refer to:

- Old Book of Tang, a 10th-century history book about the Tang dynasty
- New Book of Tang, an 11th-century history book about the Tang dynasty

== See also ==
- Tang Huiyao, the Institutional History of Tang
- Li Zhao, author of the Supplement to the Book of Tang (《唐國史補》, Tangguoshi Bu)
- Canonical Book of the Tang Dynasty (disambiguation)
- Book of Southern Tang (disambiguation)
