= Warriors in Peace =

Single by Jolin Tsai

from the album Warriors of Heaven and Earth: Original Motion Picture Soundtrack
- Language: Mandarin
- Released: September 10, 2003
- Recorded: 2003
- Genre: World
- Length: 12:01
- Label: Sony
- Composer: A. R. Rahman
- Lyricist: Francis Lee
- Producer: A. R. Rahman

Jolin Tsai singles chronology
"Magic" (2003)	"Warriors in Peace" (2003)	"J-Game" (2005)

Music video
- "Warriors in Peace" on YouTube

"Warriors in Peace" (Chinese: 海市蜃樓; pinyin: Hǎi shì shèn lóu; lit. 'Mirage') is a song by Taiwanese singer Jolin Tsai, featured on the Warriors of Heaven and Earth: Original Motion Picture Soundtrack (2003). The song was written by Francis Lee and composed and produced by A. R. Rahman. It served as the theme song for the 2003 film Warriors of Heaven and Earth and was released as a single by Sony on September 10, 2003.

== Release and promotion ==
On August 25, 2003, media outlets reported that Tsai had been invited to perform the theme song for Warriors of Heaven and Earth. On September 10, 2003, she held the "Jolin Tsai VS Warriors of Heaven and Earth" music video premiere at the Beijing International Club. She described it as her first experience recording for a major motion picture and expressed her intent to balance the film's atmosphere with her own musical style. Film director He Ping praised Tsai's gentle voice, which he felt was a fitting match for the film's tone. He invited Indian composer A. R. Rahman to produce the track, with production costs reportedly reaching RMB 1 million.

On September 11, 2003, Tsai attended the "Warriors in Peace" launch ceremony at the Portman Ritz-Carlton in Shanghai. During the event, she addressed concerns about whether her voice would suit the style of the film, explaining that film music does not always require a strong or forceful tone, a softer voice could also effectively convey the intended emotion and harmony.

== Composition and recording ==
Tsai traveled to India to record the song, where she waited at her hotel until A. R. Rahman personally called her to begin recording. The track marks a departure from Tsai's earlier pop-oriented work, featuring a rich, exotic atmosphere characterized by grandeur and melancholy. Tsai described her recording experience, saying, "When the music starts playing, you immediately feel how passionate your emotions are."

== Music video ==
The music video for "Warriors in Peace" was produced with a budget exceeding NT$1 million. Filmed on 35mm, it featured extensive post-production CGI effects designed to evoke a vast and desolate mood, complementing the song's tone. The video centers around the theme of "love and peace" and incorporates ethnic motifs and visual symbolism. Tsai appears in flowing white veils, performing choreography inspired by Indian dance in a desert setting. She personally selected all of the accessories featured in the video.

== Live performances ==
Tsai performed "Warriors in Peace" at the global premiere of Warriors of Heaven and Earth on September 23, 2003, at Duanmen in Beijing. She also performed the song at the film's Taiwan premiere on October 1, 2003.

== Track listing ==
1. "The Golden Era" – 3:58
2. "Warriors in Peace" – 4:35
3. "Dacoit Duel" – 3:28

== Credits and personnel ==
- H. Sridhar – mixing
- S. Sivakumar – mixing
- Adithya Modi – assistant engineering
- Noor Mohammed – assistant engineering
- Noell James – music coordination

== Release history ==
Release dates and formats for "Warriors in Peace"
Region	Date	Format(s)	Distributor
Taiwan	September 10, 2003	Radio airplay	Sony
