= Tumen Township, Hebei =

Coordinates: 37°37′52″N 114°15′44″E

Tumen Township, Zanhuang County 土门乡
- Township

Chinese transcription(s)
- Interactive map of Tumen Township, Zanhuang County
- Country: China
- Province: Hebei
- Prefecture: Shijiazhuang
- County: Zanhuang County
- Time zone: UTC+8 (China Standard Time)

Tumen Township (Chinese: 土门乡) is a township-level division of Zanhuang County, Shijiazhuang, Hebei, China.

== See also ==
- List of township-level divisions of Hebei
