= 46th Berlin International Film Festival =

1996 film festival in Berlin, Germany

- Festival poster
- Location: Berlin, Germany
- Founded: 1951
- Awards: Golden Bear: Sense and Sensibility
- No. of films: 339 films
- Festival date: 15–26 February 1996
- Website: Website

Berlin International Film Festival chronology
- 47th 45th

The 46th annual Berlin International Film Festival was held from 15 to 26 February 1996. The Golden Bear was awarded to Sense and Sensibility directed by Ang Lee.

The retrospective dedicated to American film director, producer and screenwriter William Wyler was shown at the festival.

== Juries ==
=== Main Competition ===
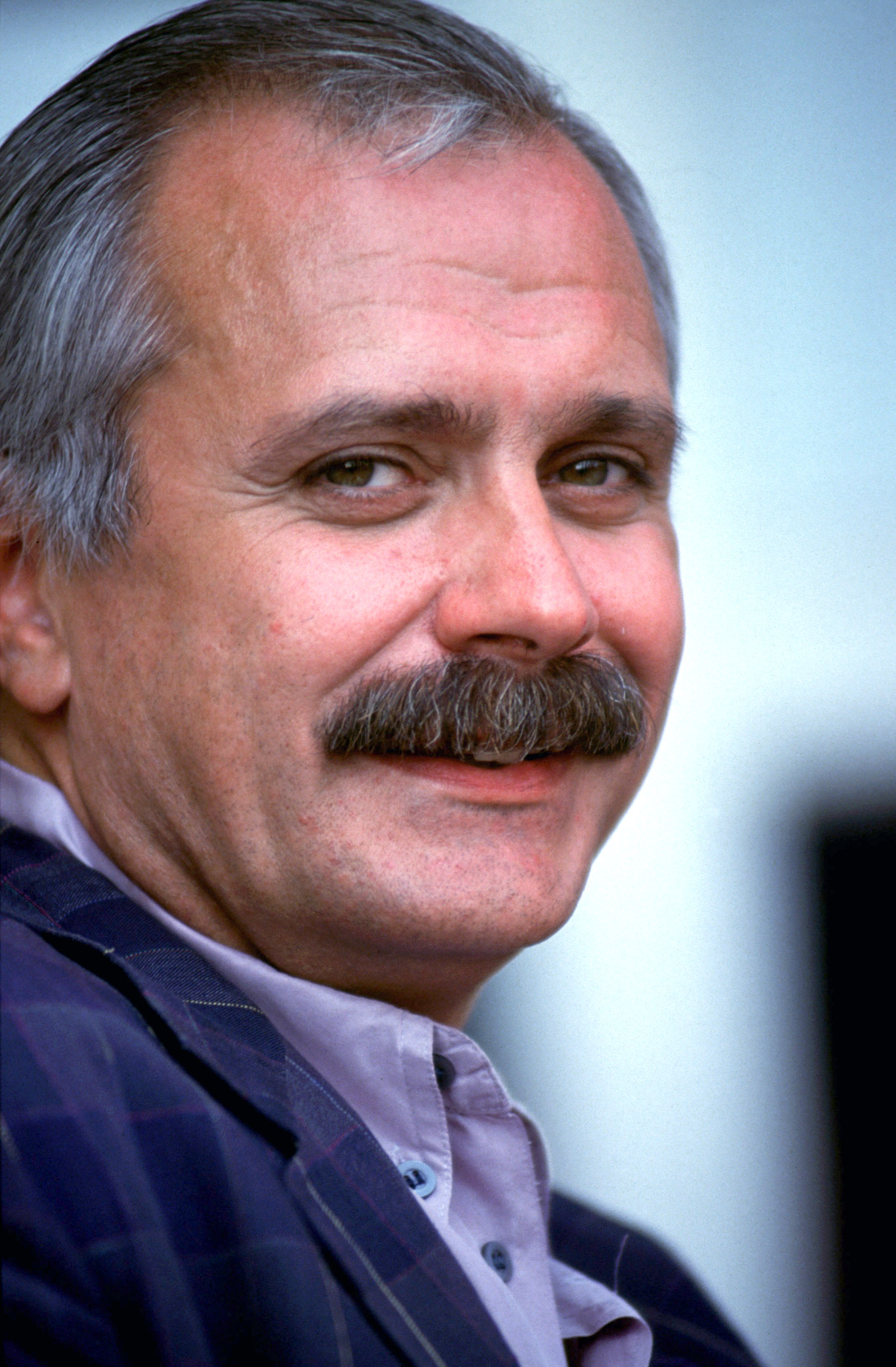
Nikita Mikhalkov, Jury President

The following people were announced as being on the jury for the festival:

- Nikita Mikhalkov, Russian actor, filmmaker and producer - Jury President
- Gila Almagor, Israeli actress and writer
- Vincenzo Cerami, Italian writer, screenwriter and playwright
- Joan Chen, Chinese-American actress and director
- Ann Hui, Hong Kong filmmaker
- Peter Lilienthal, German filmmaker
- Jürgen Prochnow, German actor
- Claude Rich, French actor
- Fay Weldon, British writer and playwright
- Catherine Wyler, American producer and artistic director
- Christian Zeender, Swiss musician

== Official Sections ==
=== Main Competition ===
The following films were in competition for the Golden Bear and Silver Bear awards:

English title	Original title	Director(s)	Production Country
12 Monkeys		Terry Gilliam	United States
All Things Fair	Lust och fägring stor	Bo Widerberg	Denmark, Sweden
A Single Spark	아름다운 청년 전태일	Park Kwang-su	South Korea
A Summer in La Goulette	صيف حلق الوادي	Férid Boughedir	Tunisia, France, Belgium
Dead Man Walking		Tim Robbins	United Kingdom, United States
Éxtasis		Mariano Barroso	Spain
Faithful		Paul Mazursky	United States
Get Shorty		Barry Sonnenfeld	United States
Holy Week	Wielki tydzień	Andrzej Wajda	Poland
The Liars	Les menteurs	Élie Chouraqui	France
Mahjong	麻將	Edward Yang	Taiwan
Mary Reilly		Stephen Frears	United States
My Man	Mon homme	Bertrand Blier	France
Portland		Niels Arden Oplev	Denmark
Restoration		Michael Hoffman	United Kingdom, United States
Richard III		Richard Loncraine	United Kingdom, United States
Sense and Sensibility		Ang Lee	United Kingdom, United States
Silent Night	Stille Nacht	Dani Levy	Germany, Switzerland
The Sun Has Ears	太陽有耳	Yim Ho	Hong Kong
Strangled Lives	Vite strozzate	Ricky Tognazzi	Italy, France, Belgium
Sun Valley	日光峡谷	He Ping	China
Village of Dreams	絵の中のぼくの村	Yōichi Higashi	Japan
What I Have Written		John Hughes	Australia

== Official Awards ==
=== Main Competition ===
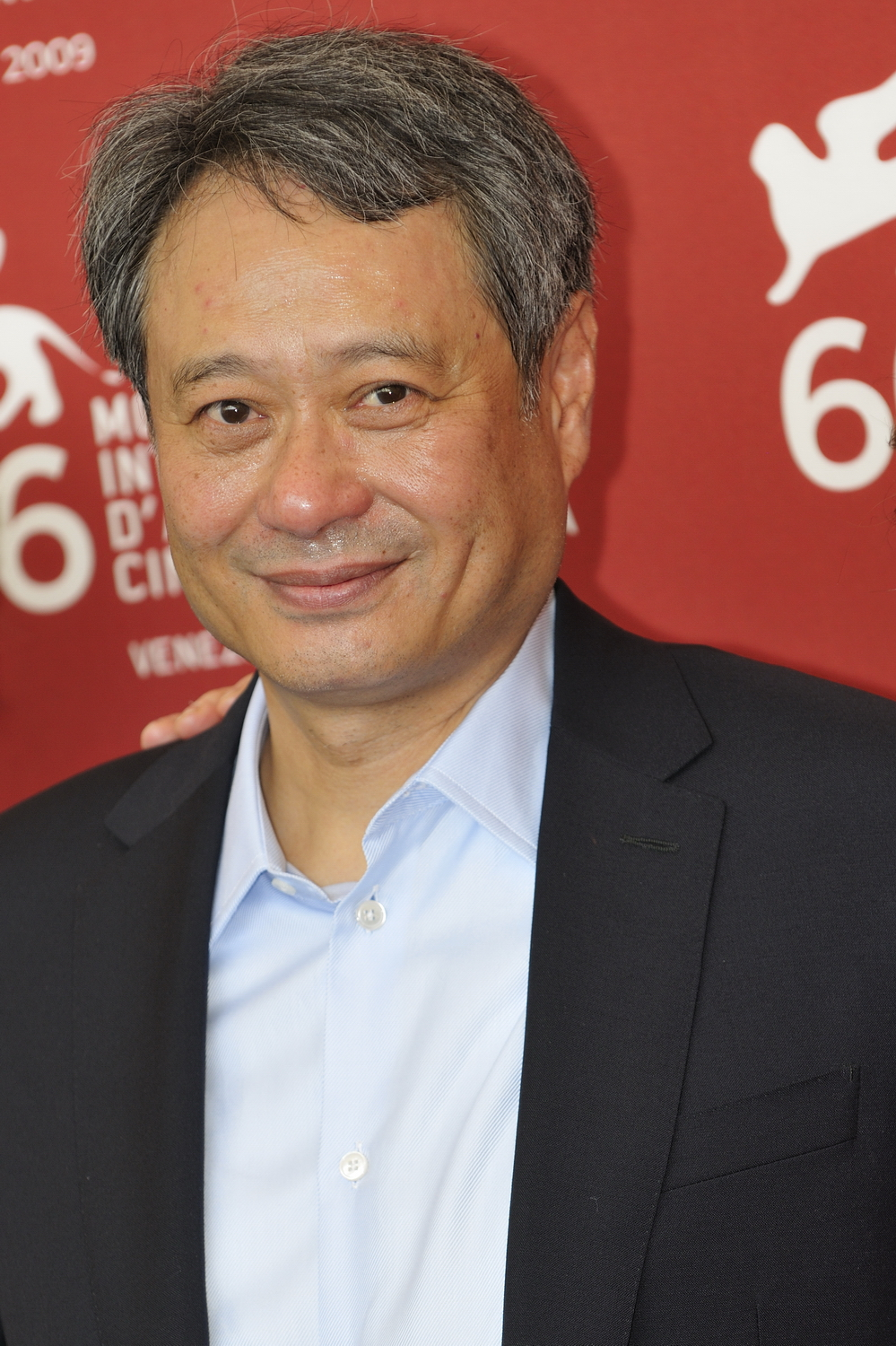
Ang Lee, winner of the Golden Bear at the festival

The following prizes were awarded by the Jury:

- Golden Bear: Sense and Sensibility by Ang Lee
- Silver Bear – Special Jury Prize: All Things Fair by Bo Widerberg
- Silver Bear for Best Director:
  - Yim Ho for Taiyang you er
  - Richard Loncraine for Richard III
- Silver Bear for Best Actress: Anouk Grinberg for My Man
- Silver Bear for Best Actor: Sean Penn for Dead Man Walking
- Silver Bear for an Outstanding Single Achievement: Yōichi Higashi for Village of Dreams
- Silver Bear for an Outstanding Artistic Contribution: Andrzej Wajda for Holy Week
- Alfred Bauer Prize: Strangled Lives
- Honourable Mention:
  - Mahjong by Edward Yang
  - Silent Night by Dani Levy
  - Sun Valley by He Ping

=== Honorary Golden Bear ===
- Jack Lemmon
- Elia Kazan

=== Berlinale Camera ===
- Tschingis Aitmatov
- Jodie Foster
- Sally Field
- Astrid Henning-Jensen
- Volker Noth

== Independent Awards ==
=== Blue Angel Award ===
- All Things Fair by Bo Widerberg

=== FIPRESCI Award ===
- The Sun Has Ears by Yim Ho
