= Zhangleng Township =

Coordinates: 37°44′37″N 114°19′41″E

Zhangleng Township 张楞乡
- Township

Chinese transcription(s)
- Interactive map of Zhangleng Township
- Country: China
- Province: Hebei
- Prefecture: Shijiazhuang
- County: Zanhuang County
- Time zone: UTC+8 (China Standard Time)

Zhangleng Township (Chinese: 张楞乡) is a township-level division of Zanhuang County, Shijiazhuang, Hebei, China.

== See also ==
- List of township-level divisions of Hebei
