= Wheat (film) =

- Film poster
- Directed by: He Ping
- Written by: He Ping
- Produced by: He Ping; Yu Dong; Zhao Guoliang
- Starring: Fan Bingbing; Huang Jue; Du Jiayi; Wang Xueqi; Wang Zhiwen
- Cinematography: Zhao Xiaoshi
- Edited by: Pink H.
- Music by: Liu Xing
- Production companies: Beijing Poly-bona Film Publishing Company; Xi'an Film Studio
- Release dates: June 13, 2009 (Shanghai International Film Festival); September 28, 2009 (China)
- Running time: 108 minutes
- Country: China
- Language: Mandarin

Wheat (simplified Chinese: 麦田; traditional Chinese: 麥田; pinyin: Mài Tián) is a 2009 Chinese historical drama film directed by He Ping, starring Fan Bingbing, Huang Jue, Du Jiayi, Wang Xueqi and Wang Zhiwen. The film tells the story of women left behind when their husbands went to war.

The film was produced for US$6 million and was funded by He Ping's own Beijing Classic Culture, along with Polybona Films, and the state-backed Xi'an Film Studio.

== Cast ==
- Fan Bingbing as Li
- Huang Jue as Xia
- Du Jiayi as Zhe
- Wang Xueqi as Lord Ju Cong
- Wang Zhiwen as Chong
- Wang Ji
- Li Ge
- Sun Guitian
- Wang Jiajia as Yan

== Release ==
Filmed in 2008, Wheat premiered on June 13, 2009, as the opening film to the 2009 Shanghai International Film Festival.
