= Huangbeiping Township =

Huangbeiping Township 黄北坪乡
- Township
- Location in Hebei
- Coordinates: 37°35′26″N 114°11′29″E
- Country: People's Republic of China
- Province: Hebei
- Prefecture-level city: Shijiazhuang
- County: Zanhuang
- Village-level divisions: 27 villages
- Elevation: 342 m (1,122 ft)
- Time zone: UTC+8 (China Standard)
- Area code: 0311

Huangbeiping Township (simplified Chinese: 黄北坪乡; traditional Chinese: 黃北坪鄉; pinyin: Huángběipíng Xiāng) is a township of Zanhuang County in the Taihang Mountains of southwestern Hebei province, China, located about 6 kilometres (3.7 mi) from the border with Shanxi and 19 km (12 mi) southwest of the county seat as the crow flies. As of 2011, it has 27 villages under its administration.

== See also ==
- List of township-level divisions of Hebei
