= Nanxingguo Township =

Coordinates: 37.63064°N 114.48574°E

Nanxingguo Township 南邢郭乡
- Township

Chinese transcription(s)
- Interactive map of Nanxingguo Township
- Country: China
- Province: Hebei
- Prefecture: Shijiazhuang
- County: Zanhuang County
- Time zone: UTC+8 (China Standard Time)

Nanxingguo Township (Chinese: 南邢郭乡) is a township-level division of Zanhuang County, Shijiazhuang, Hebei, China.

== See also ==
- List of township-level divisions of Hebei
