= Yuantou, Hebei =

Coordinates: 37°31′52″N 114°18′52″E

Yuantou 院头镇
- Town

Chinese transcription(s)
- Interactive map of Yuantou
- Country: China
- Province: Hebei
- Prefecture: Shijiazhuang
- County: Zanhuang County
- Time zone: UTC+8 (China Standard Time)

Yuantou (Chinese: 院头镇) is a township-level division of Zanhuang County, Shijiazhuang, Hebei, China.

== See also ==
- List of township-level divisions of Hebei
