= Mycoplasma hyopneumoniae =

Scientific classification
- Domain: Bacteria
- Kingdom: Bacillati
- Phylum: Mycoplasmatota
- Class: Mollicutes
- Order: Mycoplasmatales
- Family: Mycoplasmataceae
- Genus: Mycoplasma
- Species: M. hyopneumoniae

Binomial name
- Mycoplasma hyopneumoniae Maré and Switzer, 1965.

Species of bacterium

Mycoplasma hyopneumoniae is a species of bacteria known to cause the disease porcine enzootic pneumonia, a highly contagious and chronic disease affecting pigs. As with other mollicutes, M. hyopneumoniae is small in size (400–1200 nm), has a small genome (893–920 kilo-base pairs (kb)) and lacks a cell wall. It is difficult to grow in laboratories due to its complex nutritional requirements and the high chances of contamination associated with mycoplasma culture. To successfully grow the bacterium, an environment of 5–10% carbon dioxide is required, and the medium should demonstrate an acid colour shift.

This bacterium is a concern in the livestock industry as it causes a significant reduction in the growing weight of pigs. Losses in the U.S. have been previously estimated at 200 million to 1 billion dollars per annum. Porcine enzootic pneumonia is endemic worldwide and M. hyopneumoniae is present in almost every pig herd. Treatment of this disease is limited to antibiotics, which are currently ineffective as they do not completely remove the infection. Vaccines have been found to reduce the severity of the disease but do not prevent the disease from occurring in infected pigs.

== Pathogenesis ==
Mycoplasma hyopneumoniae attaches to the cilia of epithelial cells in the lungs of swine, causing the cilia to stop beating (ciliostasis), clumping and loss of cilia, eventually leading to epithelial cell death; which is the source of the lesions found in the lungs of pigs with porcine enzootic pneumonia. This damage impedes normal ciliary clearance and often secondary infections develop. On a cellular level, mononuclear infiltration of peribronchiolar and perivascular areas occurs.

The immune response to M. hyopneumoniae in pigs is slow and ineffective; it is also believed to cause much of the damage that is seen in pigs with the disease. This mycoplasma is not known to produce any specifically harmful toxin like many other disease-causing bacteria, but some mildly toxic by-products have been observed.

== Conclusions ==
Mycoplasma hyopneumoniae has been a topic of interest in the scientific community due to the economic impact of porcine enzootic pneumonia. Three separate strains (232, J & 7448) of this mycoplasma have had their genomes sequenced, making it the most sequenced mycoplasma. Research has been mainly focused on identifying adhesins with a final goal of developing an effective vaccine that prevents M. hyopneumoniae from attaching to lung cilia.
