= Zhangshiyan Township =

Coordinates: 37°29′54″N 114°05′31″E

Zhangshiyan Township 嶂石岩乡
- Township

Chinese transcription(s)
- Interactive map of Zhangshiyan Township
- Country: China
- Province: Hebei
- Prefecture: Shijiazhuang
- County: Zanhuang County
- Time zone: UTC+8 (China Standard Time)

Zhangshiyan Township (Chinese: 嶂石岩乡) is a township-level division of Zanhuang County, Shijiazhuang, Hebei, China.

== See also ==
- List of township-level divisions of Hebei
