= Wu Dexin =

Chinese scientist (1936–2026)

- 吴德馨
- Born: 20 December 1936; Laoting County, Hebei, China
- Died: 23 March 2026 (aged 89)
- Education: Tsinghua University
- Spouse: Wang Wei
- Scientific career
- Fields: Semiconductor; Integrated circuit
- Workplaces: Institute of Microelectronics, Chinese Academy of Sciences

Chinese name
- Simplified Chinese: 吴德馨
- Traditional Chinese: 吳德馨
Transcriptions
Standard Mandarin
- Hanyu Pinyin: Wú Déxīn

Wu Dexin (20 December 1936 – 23 March 2026) was a Chinese scientist who specialised in semiconductor and integrated circuit. She was an academician of the Chinese Academy of Sciences.

== Early life and career ==
Wu was born in Laoting County, Hebei on 20 December 1936. After graduating from the Department of Radio Electronic Engineering, Tsinghua University in 1961, she was despatched to the Institute of Semiconductors, Chinese Academy of Sciences. She joined the Chinese Communist Party in January 1979. In 1986, she was transferred to CAS's Microelectronics Center (now Institute of Microelectronics) and appointed deputy director. In 1991, she was promoted to become director, a position she held until 1997. In 1992, she was employed by the State Science and Technology Commission (now Ministry of Science and Technology) as the chief scientist of the project "deep submicron structure devices and mesoscopic physics".

She was a delegate and member of the 9th Standing Committee of the National People's Congress.

== Personal life and death ==
Wu was married to Wang Wei, who is also an academician of the Chinese Academy of Sciences. She died on 23 March 2026, at the age of 89.

== Honors and awards ==
- 1991 Chinese Academy of Sciences (CAS)
- 1999 State Science and Technology Progress Award (Second Class) for the invention of a full set of 0.8-micron CMOS technology
- 2004 Science and Technology Progress Award of the Ho Leung Ho Lee Foundation
