= The Sun Has Ears =

1996 Hong Kong film by Yim Ho

- DVD cover
- Directed by: Yim Ho
- Starring: Qiang Gao; You Yong; Yu Zhang
- Cinematography: Zhao Fei
- Music by: Otomo Yoshihide
- Production company: Moonhill International
- Release date: February 1996 (Berlin International Film Festival)
- Running time: 104 minutes
- Country: Hong Kong
- Language: Cantonese

The Sun Has Ears (Chinese: 太陽有耳; Jyutping: taai3 joeng4 jau5 ji5) is a 1996 Hong Kong drama film directed by Yim Ho. It was entered into the 46th Berlin International Film Festival, where Yim Ho won the Silver Bear for Best Director.

== Cast ==
- Qiang Gao
- You Yong
- Yu Zhang
