= Xiyangze Township =

Coordinates: 37°34′37″N 114°21′35″E

Xiyangze Township 西阳泽乡
- Township

Chinese transcription(s)
- Interactive map of Xiyangze Township
- Country: China
- Province: Hebei
- Prefecture: Shijiazhuang
- County: Zanhuang County
- Time zone: UTC+8 (China Standard Time)

Xiyangze Township (Chinese: 西阳泽乡) is a township-level division of Zanhuang County, Shijiazhuang, Hebei, China.

== See also ==
- List of township-level divisions of Hebei
