= Zanhuang County =

Zanhuang County 赞皇县 Tsanhwang
- County
- Location in Hebei
- Coordinates: 37°39′56″N 114°23′10″E
- Country: People's Republic of China
- Province: Hebei
- Prefecture-level city: Shijiazhuang
- Time zone: UTC+8 (China Standard)

Zanhuang County (simplified Chinese: 赞皇县; traditional Chinese: 贊皇縣; pinyin: Zànhuáng Xiàn; lit. 'Praising Emperor') is a county in the southwestern Hebei Province, North China, bordering Shanxi province to the west. It is under the administration of the prefecture-level city of Shijiazhuang, the provincial capital.

== Administrative divisions ==
Towns:

- Zanhuang Town (赞皇镇), Yuantou (院头镇)

Townships:

- Nanxingguo Township (南邢郭乡), Nanqinghe Township (南清河乡), Xiyangze Township (西阳泽乡), Huangbeiping Township (黄北坪乡), Xuting Township (许亭乡), Zhangshiyan Township (嶂石岩乡), Zhangleng Township (张楞乡), Xilongmen Township (西龙门乡), Tumen Township (土门乡)

== Climate ==
Climate data for Zanhuang, elevation 159 m (522 ft), (1991–2020 normals, extremes 1981–2010)
Month	Jan	Feb	Mar	Apr	May	Jun	Jul	Aug	Sep	Oct	Nov	Dec	Year
Record high °C (°F)	18.7 (65.7)	26.2 (79.2)	32.3 (90.1)	36.9 (98.4)	42.4 (108.3)	42.3 (108.1)	43.4 (110.1)	37.5 (99.5)	39.3 (102.7)	35.0 (95.0)	27.7 (81.9)	24.0 (75.2)	43.4 (110.1)
Mean daily maximum °C (°F)	3.4 (38.1)	7.6 (45.7)	14.7 (58.5)	22.0 (71.6)	27.7 (81.9)	32.2 (90.0)	32.2 (90.0)	30.3 (86.5)	26.6 (79.9)	20.6 (69.1)	11.7 (53.1)	5.1 (41.2)	19.5 (67.1)
Daily mean °C (°F)	−2.0 (28.4)	1.8 (35.2)	8.6 (47.5)	15.7 (60.3)	21.7 (71.1)	26.2 (79.2)	27.2 (81.0)	25.5 (77.9)	21 (70)	14.6 (58.3)	6.2 (43.2)	−0.1 (31.8)	13.9 (57.0)
Mean daily minimum °C (°F)	−6.3 (20.7)	−2.9 (26.8)	3.2 (37.8)	9.9 (49.8)	15.7 (60.3)	20.5 (68.9)	22.9 (73.2)	21.5 (70.7)	16.3 (61.3)	9.7 (49.5)	1.9 (35.4)	−4.1 (24.6)	9.0 (48.3)
Record low °C (°F)	−15.7 (3.7)	−14.6 (5.7)	−8.1 (17.4)	−0.6 (30.9)	5.6 (42.1)	11.2 (52.2)	16.0 (60.8)	13.7 (56.7)	6.0 (42.8)	−2.4 (27.7)	−13.7 (7.3)	−16.2 (2.8)	−16.2 (2.8)
Average precipitation mm (inches)	2.7 (0.11)	4.8 (0.19)	10.4 (0.41)	25.8 (1.02)	40.8 (1.61)	54.1 (2.13)	135.5 (5.33)	142.4 (5.61)	58.1 (2.29)	26.7 (1.05)	15.1 (0.59)	3.6 (0.14)	520 (20.48)
Average precipitation days (≥ 0.1 mm)	1.7	2.5	2.6	5.4	6.9	8.8	11.8	11.1	7.9	6.0	3.8	2.0	70.5
Average snowy days	2.9	3.0	1.2	0.2	0	0	0	0	0	0	1.7	2.5	11.5
Average relative humidity (%)	55	50	45	50	52	55	71	76	70	63	61	58	59
Mean monthly sunshine hours	143.7	156.4	200.3	231.5	257.7	226.1	181.4	187.9	186.4	181.8	155.1	147.5	2,255.8
Percentage possible sunshine	47	51	54	58	59	51	41	45	51	53	51	50	51
Source: China Meteorological Administration
