= Xilongmen Township =

Coordinates: 37°40′11″N 114°23′17″E

Xilongmen Township 西龙门乡
- Township

Chinese transcription(s)
- Interactive map of Xilongmen Township
- Country: China
- Province: Hebei
- Prefecture: Shijiazhuang
- County: Zanhuang County
- Time zone: UTC+8 (China Standard Time)

Xilongmen Township (Chinese: 西龙门乡) is a township-level division of Zanhuang County, Shijiazhuang, Hebei, China.

== See also ==
- List of township-level divisions of Hebei
