= The Promised Land (2015 film) =

2015 film

- Poster
- Directed by: He Ping
- Written by: He Ping
- Starring: Jiajia Wang
- Cinematography: Shao Dan
- Production company: Beijing Century Media Culture
- Release dates: 14 September 2015 (TIFF); 27 October 2015 (China)
- Running time: 102 minutes
- Country: China
- Language: Mandarin

The Promised Land (pinyin: Hui dao bei ai de mei yi tian) is a 2015 Chinese drama film directed by He Ping. It was shown in the Platform section of the 2015 Toronto International Film Festival, where it received an honorable mention from the jury. The film was released on 27 October 2015.

== Cast ==
- Jiajia Wang
- Yi Zhang
- Zhiwen Wang
- Yiwei Liu

== Reception ==
The film has earned CN¥0.82 million at the Chinese box office.
