= Nanqinghe Township =

Coordinates: 37°37′03″N 114°23′38″E

Nanqinghe Township 南清河乡
- Township

Chinese transcription(s)
- Interactive map of Nanqinghe Township
- Country: China
- Province: Hebei
- Prefecture: Shijiazhuang
- County: Zanhuang County
- Time zone: UTC+8 (China Standard Time)

Nanqinghe Township (Chinese: 南清河乡) is a township-level division of Zanhuang County, Shijiazhuang, Hebei, China.

== See also ==
- List of township-level divisions of Hebei
