= Xuting Township =

Coordinates: 37°42′04″N 114°14′24″E

Xuting Township 许亭乡
- Township

Chinese transcription(s)
- Interactive map of Xuting Township
- Country: China
- Province: Hebei
- Prefecture: Shijiazhuang
- County: Zanhuang County
- Time zone: UTC+8 (China Standard Time)

Xuting Township (Chinese: 许亭乡) is a township-level division of Zanhuang County, Shijiazhuang, Hebei, China.

== See also ==
- List of township-level divisions of Hebei
