= Xie Yi =

Chinese chemist

- 谢毅
- Born: July 23, 1967 (age 59); Fuyang, Anhui, China
- Education: Xiamen University; University of Science and Technology of China; Stony Brook University
- Awards: TWAS Prize (2014); L'Oréal-UNESCO Awards for Women in Science (2015)
- Scientific career
- Fields: Inorganic solid-state chemistry
- Workplaces: University of Science and Technology of China
- Doctoral advisor: Qian Yitai

Xie Yi FRSC (simplified Chinese: 谢毅; traditional Chinese: 謝毅; pinyin: Xiè Yì; born 23 July 1967) is a Chinese chemist. She is a member of the Chinese Academy of Sciences and a fellow of the Royal Society of Chemistry. She is a professor and doctoral supervisor at University of Science and Technology of China.

Xie won the L'Oréal-UNESCO Awards for Women in Science in March 2015.

== Early life and education ==
Xie was born in Fuyang, Anhui on July 23, 1967; her ancestral home is in Anqing, Anhui. She entered Xiamen University in September 1984, majoring in chemistry at the Department of Chemistry, where she graduated in July 1988. After college, she was assigned to a chemical plant in Hefei as an assistant engineer. In September 1992, she was accepted to University of Science and Technology of China, studying chemistry under Qian Yitai, and she earned her doctorate in May 1996. From September 1997 to July 1998, she did postdoctoral work at Stony Brook University.

== Research and career ==
Xie became a professor at University of Science and Technology of China since November 1998 and doctoral supervisor since April 1999. In August 2013, she was elected a fellow of the Royal Society of Chemistry. On December 19, 2013, she was elected a fellow of the Chinese Academy of Sciences.

Xie together with her lab is pursuing cutting-edge research at four major frontiers: solid-state chemistry, nanotechnology, energy materials, and theoretical physics. In particular, the research focuses on the design and synthesize inorganic functional solids with efforts to modulate their electron and phonon structures, including the following topics:

1. Characterization of the low-dimensional solids and the relationship study of special electronic structure with their intrinsic properties
2. New approaches to decoupled optimization of thermoelectric properties
3. Important inorganic functional materials responsive to light, magnetism, electricity, and heat, and the control of their intelligent characteristics
4. Flexible nanodevices for high-efficient energy-storage and conversion
5. Nanostructured photocatalysts for CO_{2} enrichment and conversion

== Awards ==
- 2014: TWAS Prize
- 2015: L'Oréal-UNESCO Awards for Women in Science
- 2016: Asian Scientist 100, Asian Scientist

== Selected papers ==
Some of Xie most cited publications are:

- Xie, J., Zhang, H., Li, S., Wang, R., Sun, X., Zhou, M., … Xie, Y. (2013). Defect-Rich MoS_{2} Ultrathin Nanosheets with Additional Active Edge Sites for Enhanced Electrocatalytic Hydrogen Evolution. Advanced Materials, 25(40), 5807–5813. doi:10.1002/adma.201302685.
- Defect‐rich MoS_{2} ultrathin nanosheets are synthesized on a gram scale for electrocatalytic hydrogen evolution. The novel defect‐rich structure introduces additional active edge sites into the MoS_{2} ultrathin nanosheets, which significantly improves their electrocatalytic performance. Low onset overpotential and small Tafel slope, along with large cathodic current density and excellent durability, are all achieved for the novel hydrogen‐evolution‐reaction electrocatalyst. The study employed various spectroscopy and imaging tools such as X-ray photoelectron spectroscopy, Annular dark-field imaging, X-ray crystallography, Field-emission microscopy, High-resolution transmission electron microscopy and Fourier-transform infrared spectroscopy.
- Yuan, C., Wu, H. B., Xie, Y., & Lou, X. W. (David). (2014). Mixed Transition-Metal Oxides: Design, Synthesis, and Energy-Related Applications. Angewandte Chemie International Edition, 53(6), 1488–1504. doi:10.1002/anie.201303971.
- A promising family of mixed transition‐metal oxides (MTMOs) (designated as AxB3‐xO4; A, B=Co, Ni, Zn, Mn, Fe, etc.) with stoichiometric or even non‐stoichiometric compositions, typically in a spinel structure, has recently attracted increasing research interest worldwide. Benefiting from their remarkable electrochemical properties, these MTMOs will play significant roles for low‐cost and environmentally friendly energy storage/conversion technologies. In this Review, we summarize recent research advances in the rational design and efficient synthesis of MTMOs with controlled shapes, sizes, compositions, and micro‐/nanostructures, along with their applications as electrode materials for lithium‐ion batteries and electrochemical capacitors, and efficient electrocatalysts for the oxygen reduction reaction in metal–air batteries and fuel cells. Some future trends and prospects to further develop advanced MTMOs for next‐generation electrochemical energy storage/conversion systems are also presented.
- Zhang, X., Xie, X., Wang, H., Zhang, J., Pan, B., & Xie, Y. (2013). Enhanced Photoresponsive Ultrathin Graphitic-Phase C_{3}N_{4} Nanosheets for Bioimaging. Journal of the American Chemical Society, 135(1), 18–21. doi:10.1021/ja308249k.
- Two-dimensional nanosheets have attracted tremendous attention because of their promising practical application and theoretical values. The atomic-thick nanosheets are able to not only enhance the intrinsic properties of their bulk counterparts but also give birth to new promising properties. Herein, we highlight an available pathway to prepare the ultrathin graphitic-phase C_{3}N_{4} (g-C_{3}N_{4}) nanosheets by a “green” liquid exfoliation route from bulk g-C_{3}N_{4} in water for the first time. The as-obtained ultrathin g-C_{3}N_{4} nanosheet solution is very stable in both the acidic and alkaline environment and shows pH-dependent photoluminescence (PL). Compared to the bulk g-C_{3}N_{4}, ultrathin g-C_{3}N_{4} nanosheets show enhanced intrinsic photoabsorption and photoresponse, which induce their extremely high PL quantum yield up to 19.6%. Thus, benefiting from the inherent blue light PL with high quantum yields and high stability, good biocompatibility, and nontoxicity, the water-soluble ultrathin g-C_{3}N_{4} nanosheet is a brand-new but promising candidate for bioimaging application. First-principle density-functional (Density functional theory (DFT)) calculations were performed to study the electronic structure of the bulk and single-layered nanosheet of g-C_{3}N_{4} . Spectroscopy tools such as Transmission electron microscopy and Atomic force microscopy were used for acquiring structural information about the nanosheet. In addition, Ultraviolet–visible spectroscopy was employed for photoluminescence characterization.

== See also ==
- Women in chemistry
