= Swordsmen in Double Flag Town =

1991 Chinese film by He Ping

- Film poster
- 双旗镇刀客
- Directed by: He Ping
- Written by: He Ping; Yang Zhengguang
- Starring: Gao Yiwei; Zhao Mana; Chang Jiang; Sun Haiying
- Cinematography: Ma Delin
- Edited by: Hong Yuan
- Music by: Tao Long
- Production company: Xi'an Film Studio
- Distributed by: China Film Export & Import Corporation
- Release date: 1991 (China)
- Running time: 91 minutes
- Country: China
- Language: Mandarin

Swordsmen in Double Flag Town (Chinese: 双旗镇刀客), also known as The Swordsman in Double Flag Town, is a 1991 Chinese film directed by He Ping, starring Gao Yiwei, Zhang Mana, Chang Jiang, and Sun Haiying. The film is a mix of the wuxia and spaghetti western genres and is the first of He Ping's thematic trilogy set in western China, followed by Sun Valley and Warriors of Heaven and Earth.

== Synopsis ==
Haige, a quiet teenage boy, travels to the edge of the Gobi Desert in western China to marry Haomei, who has been betrothed to him before both of them were born. He makes his way to Double Flag Town, a lawless, dusty border town. Along the way, he meets Desert Eagle, a bandit who robs the rich to help the poor. Desert Eagle tells the boy to find him if he encounters any trouble.

Haige finds Haomei and her father, who has lost one leg and runs a restaurant in town. At first, Haomei feels disgusted by the dirty, unkempt boy but she gradually succumbs to his taciturn charms. It appears that Haige has been well-trained in martial arts by his late father, and has inherited the latter's long daggers.

One day, bandits show up at the restaurant and one of them attempts to rape Haomei. Haige intervenes and kills the assailant, who turns out to be the notorious bandit chief Lethal Swordsman's brother. After Haige and Haomei are married, Haomei's father urges them to leave the town for good, but the townsfolk insist that Haige be handed over to Lethal Swordsman or else the bandits will kill everyone in town. Haige seeks help from Desert Eagle, who promises to appear at high noon two days later when the bandits show up.

One the fateful day, Lethal Swordsman and his bandit gang ride to the town and kill everyone in their way, including Haomei's father. Lethal Swordsman then fights Haige, who soon realises that Desert Eagle has lied about showing up to help him. Nevertheless, Haige fatally wounds Lethal Swordsman with his daggers; the bandit chief dies, seemingly impressed with the boy's skills. At this point, Desert Eagle appears and claims Lethal Swordsman's weapon while Haige staggers away wearily, saying that Desert Eagle has betrayed him. The closing shot shows Haige and Haomei riding away from the town during sunset.

== Cast ==
- Gao Yiwei as Haige
- Zhao Mana as Haomei
- Chang Jiang as Haomei's father
- Sun Haiying as Lethal Swordsman
- Wang Gang as Desert Eagle

== Accolades ==
Award	Category	Recipient	Result	Ref
1991 Golden Rooster Awards	Best Art Direction	Qian Yunxuan	Won	
1991 Golden Rooster Awards	Best Cinematographer	Ma Delin	Nominated	
1992 Yubari International Fantastic Film Festival	Grand Prize	He Ping	Won	
1992 Torino Film Festival	Best Feature Film	He Ping	Nominated	
