= Canonical Book of the Tang Dynasty =

Canonical Book of the Tang Dynasty may refer to one of the two canonical history books about the Tang dynasty:

- First Canonical Book of the Tang Dynasty 《舊唐書》, compiled under Liu Xu (劉昫) in 945
- Second Canonical Book of the Tang Dynasty 《新唐書》, compiled under Ouyang Xiu (歐陽修) and Song Qi (宋祁) in 1060

== See also ==
- Tang Huiyao, the Institutional History of Tang
- Book of Tang (disambiguation)
