= Ge Xiurun =

Chinese engineer (1934–2023)

- 葛修润
- Born: 12 July 1934; Nanhui County, Shanghai, China
- Died: 4 January 2023 (aged 88); China
- Education: Tsinghua University; Odesa State Academy of Civil Engineering and Architecture
- Scientific career
- Fields: Rock mechanics
- Workplaces: Wuhan Institute of Geotechnical Mechanics, Chinese Academy of Sciences

Chinese name
- Simplified Chinese: 葛修润
- Traditional Chinese: 葛修潤
Transcriptions
Standard Mandarin
- Hanyu Pinyin: Gě Xiūrùn

Ge Xiurun (Chinese: 葛修润; 12 July 1934 – 4 January 2023) was a Chinese rock mechanics engineer, and an academician of the Chinese Academy of Engineering.

== Biography ==
Ge was born in Nanhui County (now Nanhui District), Shanghai on July 12, 1934. He attended the Nanyang Model High School. In 1952, he was accepted to Tsinghua University, where he majored in the Water Conservancy Department. In 1954, he arrived in the Soviet Union to begin his education at the Odesa State Academy of Civil Engineering and Architecture.

He returned to China after graduating with a vice-doctorate degree and began working in the Central South Institute of Mechanics, Chinese Academy of Sciences, which was reshuffled as the Wuhan Institute of Geotechnical Mechanics later. Between 1981 and 1983, he worked at the Karlsruhe Institute of Technology, alongside Leopold Müller. From January 1980 to January 1998, he successively worked as deputy director and then director of the Research Office of Wuhan Institute of Geotechnical Mechanics, Chinese Academy of Sciences. He joined the Chinese Communist Party (CCP) in January 1985.

On January 4, 2023, Ge died at the age of 88.

== Honours and awards ==
- 1985 State Science and Technology Progress Award (Special) for the Gezhouba Second and Third Rivers Project and Its Hydropower Units
- 1990 State Science and Technology Progress Award (Third Class) for the three dimensional finite element analysis of gravity dam on Qing River considering complex foundation
- 1995 Member of the Chinese Academy of Engineering (CAE)
