= 2023 Chinese pneumonia outbreak =

Disease outbreak in northern China

- Disease: Pneumonia
- Location: Northern China
- Index case: Dalian, China
- Date: November 2023 – 2024

In November 2023, China's health authorities reported an outbreak of respiratory illnesses in several parts of northern China. As hospitals became overwhelmed in Beijing and Liaoning, the World Health Organization (WHO) requested detailed information from China regarding the surges in respiratory health, while advising the community to take important precautions. China complied, responding that "no unusual or novel pathogens were found" in the provided data.

As of 23 November 2023, the cause of the outbreak is unknown. Possible reasons include known seasonal diseases and the lifting of COVID-19 restrictions.

== Timeline ==
=== May–October 2023 ===
As reported in China Daily, an increase of mycoplasma pneumoniae infections in China was observed in May 2023 by Zhou Huixia, director of a children's medical centre, with a "rapid increase" in August and a "particularly ferocious" wave starting in early October. On 24 October 2023, Zhou predicted that the wave would peak in November.

=== November 2023 ===
On 13 November, authorities from China's National Health Commission reported an increase in respiratory diseases. The increase in these diseases was attributed to the lifting of COVID-19 restrictions earlier in the year, and the circulation of known pathogens including influenza, mycoplasma pneumoniae (a common bacterial infection typically affecting young children), respiratory syncytial virus (RSV), and SARS-CoV-2.

On 21 November, ProMED reported clusters of undiagnosed pneumonia in children in northern China. It is unclear if these are associated with the overall increase in respiratory infections previously reported by Chinese authorities or separate events. Further information about recent trends in these known pathogens was requested by the WHO. The WHO stated that during October and November, northern China had reported an "increase in influenza-like illness" compared to the corresponding period during the previous three years.

On 23 November, Chinese health authorities claimed that the increase in respiratory diseases was not attributed to any novel or unknown pathogens but was relevant to known pathogens. Later, WHO verifies that no novel or unknown pathogens have been discovered so far, and the clinical features of the diseases are not unusual.

On 27 November, a journal article published in Nature indicated that there are many multiple anomalies behind the dramatic increase in respiratory disease cases in China. First, usually, the infection caused by Mycoplasma pneumoniae is easy to treat, but, in this case in China, the infection causes serious impact on Chinese children. Second, after the lifting of COVID-19 restrictions, cases reported by some of the countries are virus infections; in contrast, the major cases reported by China, particularly, are mycoplasma pneumoniae, a disease whose infection is caused by bacteria.

== Other pneumonia outbreaks in late 2023 ==
In late November 2023, Russian children's hospitals and infectious diseases hospitals in Moscow and St. Petersburg noticed a significant increase of mycoplasma pneumonia in patients with acute respiratory infections. The outbreak will likely complicate already expected epidemics such as those caused by the coronavirus, influenza A and respiratory syncytial viruses. As of December, large queues of ambulances have been reported to have formed in front of Infectious Diseases Hospitals No. 1 and No. 2 in Moscow.

A similar outbreak occurred in Ohio in the United States in late 2023. As of December 2023, Céline Gounder, an infectious disease specialist stated that the outbreaks were similar but unrelated.

Denmark reported an pneumonia outbreak. As of November 2023, 541 cases had been identified.

The Philippines Department of Health reported four confirmed cases of mycoplasma pneumoniae among reported influenza-like illnesses as of 25 November.
