= Zhao Qiguo =

Chinese pedologist (1930–2023)

- 赵其国
- Born: 25 February 1930; Hankou, Hubei, China
- Died: 3 January 2023 (aged 92); Nanjing, Jiangsu, China
- Education: Huazhong Agricultural University
- Scientific career
- Fields: Soil geography
- Workplaces: Institute of Soil Science, Chinese Academy of Sciences

Chinese name
- Simplified Chinese: 赵其国
- Traditional Chinese: 趙其國
Transcriptions
Standard Mandarin
- Hanyu Pinyin: Zhào Qíguó

Zhao Qiguo (Chinese: 赵其国; 25 February 1930 – 3 January 2023) was a Chinese soil scientist, and an academician of the Chinese Academy of Sciences. He was president of the Soil Science Society of China from 1987 to 1995.

== Biography ==
Zhao was born in Hankou (now Wuhan, Hubei), on 25 February 1930. In 1949, he was admitted to the Department of Agronomy, Wuhan University. Due to the 1952 reorganisation of Chinese higher education, he became a student of Huazhong Agricultural University.

After university in 1953, Zhao became the leader of Yunnan and Guizhou South China Rubber and Tropical Crop Suitable Forest Land Investigation Team. Between 1964 and 1968, he was deputy leader and then leader of China's expert group in Cuba. In 1973, he became the leader of Heilongjiang Wildland Resources Investigation Team, and served until 1978. In 1983, he was promoted to become director of the Institute of Soil Science, Chinese Academy of Sciences, a post he kept until 1995.

On 3 January 2023, Zhao died in Nanjing, Jiangsu, at the age of 92.

== Honours and awards ==
- 1991 Member of the Chinese Academy of Sciences (CAS)
- 1991 State Natural Science Award (Second Class)
- 2004 State Science and Technology Progress Award (Second Class)

Academic offices
Preceded by Xiong Yi	Director of the Institute of Soil Science, Chinese Academy of Sciences; 1983–1995	Succeeded by Cao Zhihong (曹志洪)
Preceded by Li Qingkui	President of the Soil Science Society of China; 1987–1995	Succeeded by Cao Zhihong (曹志洪)
