= Hu Guangzhen =

Chinese electronic engineer (1927–2023)

- 胡光镇
- Born: 26 August 1927; Songjiang County, Jiangsu, China
- Died: 23 January 2023 (aged 95); China
- Education: Jiaotong University
- Scientific career
- Fields: Electronic engineering Information and communications technology
- Workplaces: People's Liberation Army General Staff Department

Chinese name
- Simplified Chinese: 胡光镇
- Traditional Chinese: 胡光鎮
Transcriptions
Standard Mandarin
- Hanyu Pinyin: Hú Guāngzhèn

Hu Guangzhen (Chinese: 胡光镇; 26 August 1927 – 23 January 2023) was a Chinese electronic engineer, and an academician of the Chinese Academy of Engineering.

== Biography ==
Hu was born in Songjiang County (now Shanghai), Jiangsu, on 26 August 1927, and graduated from Jiaotong University in 1948. In November 1949, he became a technician of Tianjin Factory of Civil Aviation Administration of the Central Military Commission, and worked until July 1952. In August 1952, he was transferred to the People's Liberation Army General Staff Department, where he was promoted to engineer in December 1956 and to chief engineer in December 1980.

On 23 January 2023, he died at the age of 95.

== Honours and awards ==
- 1996 State Science and Technology Progress Award (Special)
- 1997 Member of the Chinese Academy of Engineering (CAE)
- 2001 State Science and Technology Progress Award (Special)
