= Li Zhao (Tang dynasty) =

- Chinese: 李肇
Transcriptions
Standard Mandarin
- Hanyu Pinyin: Lǐ Zhào
- Wade–Giles: Li Chao

Li Zhao (fl. AD 810s & 820s) was a Tang scholar-official and historian who composed a supplement to the Book of Tang.

== Life ==
Li was a native of Zanhuang in Zhao Prefecture in Hebei Circuit (now part of Shijiazhuang, Hebei Province). As a young man, he worked during the early reign of Emperor Xianzong for the Detection Branch of the Imperial Censorate as a monitor censor. In Yuanhe 13 (AD 818), he joined the Hanlin Academy in Chang'an (now Xi'an, Shaanxi). The next year, he served as an omissioner (右補闕) at the Central Secretariat. In Yuanhe 15 (AD 820), he was made deputy director of honors (司勳員外郎) at the Ministry of Personnel but was dismissed in the 1st month of Changqing 1 (821) as the new Emperor Muzong removed most high-level officials following his father's death. In the 12th month of Changqing 1 (822), he was named governor of Lizhou Prefecture in East Shannan Circuit (now Lixian, Changde, Hunan Province). Under Muzong's son Emperor Wenzong, Li returned to Chang'an to serve as head of the Central Secretariat until the 828 Bo Qi (柏耆) incident, after which he was demoted to deputy director of the Department of Public Works (將作少監).

== Works ==
Li composed a three-volume Supplement to the History of the Tang (《唐国史补》, Tángguóshǐ Bǔ) and the Records of the Hanlin Academy (《翰林志》, Hànlín Zhì), among other works.

== See also ==
- Li Jiao, another prominent Li from Zhao Prefecture under the Tang
