= Xu Mi =

Chinese nuclear technologist (1937–2023)

- 徐銤
- Born: 7 April 1937; Jiangdu County, Jiangsu, China
- Died: 4 January 2023 (aged 85); Beijing, China
- Education: Tsinghua University
- Scientific career
- Fields: Fast-neutron reactor
- Workplaces: China Institute of Atomic Energy

Xu Mi (Chinese: 徐銤; pinyin: Xú Mǐ; 7 April 1937 – 4 January 2023) was a Chinese nuclear technologist, and an academician of the Chinese Academy of Engineering.

== Name ==
Xu was born in 1937 before the Marco Polo Bridge Incident broke out. When Xu was just three months old, his father Xu Kan (徐戡) named him "Mi" (銤), hoping that he would have both money and rice.

== Biography ==
Xu was born into an intellectual family in Jiangdu County (now Yangzhou), Jiangsu, on 7 April 1937.

After graduating from the Department of Engineering Physics, Tsinghua University in 1961, he became a technician in Beijing Atomic Energy Institute and Beijing No. 194 Institute. In 1970, he participated in the startup experiment of Dongfeng VI, which was the first zero power fast reactor device in China. In 1971, he relocated to Jiajiang County, where he worked in the No. 3 Institute of the 1st Institute of Nuclear Industry Ministry. He joined the Chinese Communist Party (CCP) in July 1980. In August 1987, he became deputy director, researcher and technical director of Fast Reactor of China Institute of Atomic Energy, and served until 1996. In December 1995, with the approval of the State Council, the China Experimental Fast Reactor Project was officially established, and Xu served as the chief engineer.

On 4 January 2023, Xu died in Beijing, at the age of 85.

== Honours and awards ==
- December 2011 Member of the Chinese Academy of Engineering (CAE)
