= Ouyang Pingkai =

Chinese engineer (1945–2023)

- 欧阳平凯

President of Nanjing Tech University
- In office August 2001 – July 2012
- Preceded by: New title
- Succeeded by: Huang Wei

Personal details
- Born: 16 August 1945 Pingle County, Guangxi, China
- Died: 30 January 2023 (aged 77) Nanjing, Jiangsu, China
- Party: Chinese Communist Party
- Education: Tsinghua University
- Scientific career
- Fields: Biochemistry
- Workplaces: Nanjing Tech University

Chinese name
- Simplified Chinese: 欧阳平凯
- Traditional Chinese: 歐陽平凱
Transcriptions
Standard Mandarin
- Hanyu Pinyin: Ōuyáng Pángkǎi

Ouyang Pingkai (Chinese: 欧阳平凯; 16 August 1945 – 30 January 2023) was a Chinese engineer, a president of Nanjing Tech University, and an academician of the Chinese Academy of Engineering.

Ouyang was a representative of the 16th and the 17th National Congress of the Chinese Communist Party.

== Biography ==
Ouyang Pingkai was born in Pingle County, Guangxi, on 16 August 1945, while his ancestral home was in Xiangtan, Hunan. His father died in 1957 after he was labeled as a rightist by the Communist government, and Ouyang was forced to work to support his family instead of going to middle school. In 1963, he was admitted to Tsinghua University, where he majored in chemical engineering.

After graduating in December 1968, he was assigned to the Shijiazhuang Electrification Plant as a workshop director, where he worked for almost ten years.

In September 1978, he did his postgraduate work at Tsinghua University as part of the first group of graduate students following the ten-year Cultural Revolution.

In 1981, he was despatched to Nanjing Institute of Chemical Technology (renamed Nanjing Tech University in 2001). In April 1989 he was promoted to deputy director of the Department of Applied Chemistry, and to director in February 1992. He moved up the ranks to become vice president in February 1994 and president in December 1995. He was a visiting scholar at the University of Waterloo in April 1985, and then Purdue university in December 1986. He joined the Chinese Communist Party (CCP) in December 1987.

On 30 January 2023, he died in Nanjing, Jiangsu, at the age of 77.

== Honours and awards ==
- 2001 Member of the Chinese Academy of Engineering (CAE)

Educational offices
New title	President of Nanjing Tech University; 2001–2012	Succeeded by Huang Wei (黄维)
