= Zanhuang Town =

Zanhuang 赞皇镇
- Town
- Interactive map of Zanhuang
- Coordinates: 37°39′56″N 114°23′10″E
- Country: People's Republic of China
- Province: Hebei
- Prefecture-level city: Shijiazhuang
- County: Zanhuang
- Elevation: 121 m (397 ft)
- Time zone: UTC+8 (China Standard Time)
- Postal code: 051230
- Area code: 0311

Zanhuang (simplified Chinese: 赞皇; traditional Chinese: 贊皇; pinyin: Zànhuáng) is a town in and the seat of Zanhuang County, in southwestern Hebei province, China, located in the foothills of the Taihang Mountains about 40 km (25 mi) south-southwest of the provincial capital of Shijiazhuang. As of 2011, it has 25 villages under its administration.

== See also ==
- List of township-level divisions of Hebei
