= Porcine enzootic pneumonia =

Swine respiratory disease

Porcine enzootic pneumonia, also known as mycoplasmal pneumonia, is a chronic respiratory disease of pigs caused by Mycoplasma hyopneumoniae.

It is part of the Porcine Respiratory Disease Complex along with Swine Influenza, PRRS and Porcine circovirus 2, and even though on its own it is quite a mild disease, it predisposes to secondary infections with organisms such as Pasteurella multocida.

Clinical signs are most commonly seen in pigs over 8 weeks of age, and the disease occurs worldwide. Transmission is horizontal and vertical from sows.

== Clinical signs and diagnosis ==
Pigs usually cough and may show more severe respiratory signs if secondary bacteria have invaded. This may lead to signs of pneumonia and systemic involvement.

Diagnosis relies on culture and isolation of the bacteria but this can be challenging.

PCR, ELISA, fluorescent antibody testing and post-mortem findings all help in making the diagnosis.

== Treatment and control ==
Tiamulin, chlortetracycline or tilmicosin may be used to treat and prevent the spread of the disease.

Vaccination is a very effective method of control, and also has an effect on pig productivity.

Eradication of the disease is possible but the organism commonly reinfects herds.
