= Fan Weitang =

Chinese engineer and politician (1935–2023)

- 范维唐
- Born: 18 July 1935; Beijing, China
- Died: 1 January 2023 (aged 87); Beijing, China
- Education: University of Science and Technology Beijing; Moscow Institute of Mining
- Scientific career
- Fields: Mining engineering
- Workplaces: Ministry of Coal Industry

Chinese name
- Simplified Chinese: 范维唐
- Traditional Chinese: 范維唐
Transcriptions
Standard Mandarin
- Hanyu Pinyin: Fàn Wéitáng

Fan Weitang (Chinese: 范维唐; 18 July 1935 – 1 January 2023) was a Chinese engineer and politician who served as vice minister of coal industry from 1993 to 1995, and an academician of the Chinese Academy of Engineering.

Fan was a member of the 8th and 9th National Committees of the Chinese People's Political Consultative Conference.

== Biography ==
Fan was born in Beijing, on 18 July 1935, while his ancestral home is in Ezhou, Hubei. His father Fan Zhilun (范治纶) was a water conservancy educator, and his younger brother Fan Weicheng is also a member of the Chinese Academy of Engineering. After graduating from the Mining Department of Beijing Iron and Steel University (now University of Science and Technology Beijing) in 1956, he went to study at Beijing University of Foreign Languages and Beijing Institute of Mining (now China University of Mining and Technology). In 1959, he did his postgraduate work at Moscow Institute of Mining in the Soviet Union.

Fan returned to China in 1963 and became a member of the China Coal Research Institute. He was chief engineer of the Ministry of Coal Industry in 1986 and subsequently vice minister in 1993.

On 1 January 2023, Fan died from COVID-19 in Beijing, at the age of 87.

== Honours and awards ==
- 1994 Member of the Chinese Academy of Engineering (CAE)
- 2002 Foreign Member of the Royal Swedish Academy of Engineering Sciences (IVA)
