= Wang Zhiliang (translator) =

Chinese-Australian literary translator (1928–2022)

- 王智量
- Born: 19 June 1928; Hanzhong, Shaanxi, China
- Died: 2 January 2023 (aged 94); Xuhui District, Shanghai, China
- Education: Peking University
- Occupation: Translator
- Writing career
- Language: Chinese, Russian
- Period: 1952–2023
- Genre: Novel
- Notable work: Eugene Onegin

Wang Zhiliang (Chinese: 王智量; pinyin: Wáng Zhìliàng; 19 June 1928 – 2 January 2023) was a Chinese-Australian literary translator who had been honored by the Government of the Russian Federation. Wang rendered a great number of Russian literary works into Chinese for almost five decades, including 30 novels.

Wang was one of the main translators of the works of the Russian novelists Ivan Turgenev and Alexander Pushkin into Chinese. For his contributions to the introduction of Russian literature to foreign readers, he was honored with a Pushkin Medal by the Government of the Russian Federation in 1999.

== Life and career ==
Wang was born on 19 June 1928 in Hanzhong, Shaanxi, with his ancestral home in Jiangning County, Jiangsu.

Wang entered Peking University in 1947, majoring in Russian language, he studied literature under Hu Shih and Zhu Guangqian, and he taught there when graduated in 1952. He was transferred to the Chinese Academy of Sciences in 1954.

In 1958, Wang was labeled as a rightist by the Chinese government. Subsequently, he was sent to the May Seventh Cadre Schools to work in Taihang Mountains. In 1960, Wang worked in Shanghai as a factory worker.

After the Cultural Revolution, Wang taught at East China Normal University from 1977. In the 1990s, Wang emigrated to Australia with his children. He settled in Shanghai in the 2000s.

Wang died on 2 January 2023, at the age of 94.

== Translations ==
- Eugene Onegin (Alexander Pushkin) (叶甫盖尼·奥涅金)
- The Captain's Daughter (Alexander Pushkin) (上尉的女儿)
- Anna Karenina (Leo Tolstoy) (安娜·卡列尼娜)
- Home of the Gentry (Ivan Turgenev) (贵族之家)
- On the Eve (Ivan Turgenev) (前夜)
- Poetry of Turgenev (Ivan Turgenev) (屠格涅夫散文诗)
- Poetry of Lermontov (Mikhail Lermontov) (莱蒙托夫叙事诗集)

== Works ==
- A Poor Mountain Village (饥饿的山村)
- Russian Literature in the 19th Century (19世纪俄国文学史)
- Essays of Zhiliang (智量文论集)
- Traditions and Memories (往事与怀念)
- Renhaipiaofusanji (人海漂浮散记)
- The City: Melbourne (海市蜃楼墨尔本)

== Awards ==
- In 1999, he was awarded a Pushkin Medal for his translations by the Government of the Russian Federation.
