= 2023 Beijing hospital fire =

Hospital fire in China

2023 Changfeng Hospital fire
- Native name: 北京长峰医院火灾
- Date: 18 April 2023
- Time: 12:57 (CST, UTC+08:00)
- Location: Fengtai District, Beijing, China; 39°53′21″N 116°16′48″E
- Deaths: 29
- Injuries: 39

On 18 April 2023, a hospital fire occurred at Changfeng Hospital in Beijing, China, causing at least 29 deaths.

== Impact ==
At 04:57 GMT (12:57 CST), the fire broke out on the east wing of the in-patient department of Changfeng Hospital in Beijing. A preliminary investigation points towards renovation works having started the fire, with sparks igniting paint. The fire was later extinguished at around 05:33 GMT. At least 29 people died due to the fire, and 39 people were injured, with three in critical condition and 18 in serious condition. Seventy-one patients were transferred to another hospital after the fire. During the fire, people sought refuge by perching on air conditioning units outside the hospital and jumped off bedsheets hanging from windows as the building spewed black smoke.

== Aftermath ==
CCP Politburo member and Party Secretary of Beijing Yin Li visited the site and stated that authorities would pursue whoever started the fire. Police detained twelve people, including the hospital's director and deputy director, and the head of the firm overseeing the renovation. Multiple fire departments, including the Fengtai District Fire Rescue Detachment, the public security department, sanitation department, and the emergency management responded to the fire. Relatives of patients complained of communication delays, saying that they only learned of the fire from media sources and that it took many hours for them to learn if their relatives had survived.
