= Wang Wei (physicist) =

Chinese scientist (1937–2023)

- 王圩
- Born: 25 December 1937; Wen'an County, Hebei, China
- Died: 26 January 2023 (aged 85)
- Education: Peking University
- Spouse: Wu Dexin
- Scientific career
- Fields: Semiconductor
- Workplaces: Institute of Semiconductors, Chinese Academy of Sciences

Wang Wei (Chinese: 王圩; pinyin: Wáng Wéi; 25 December 1937 – 26 January 2023) was a Chinese scientist specializing in semiconductor.

== Biography ==
Wang was born in Wen'an County, Hebei, on 25 December 1937. After graduating from the Department of Physics, Peking University in 1960, he was despatched to the Institute of Semiconductors, Chinese Academy of Sciences.

== Personal life and death ==
Wang married Wu Dexin, who is also an academician of the Chinese Academy of Sciences.

Wand died on 26 January 2023, at the age of 85.

== Honours and awards ==
- 1997 Member of the Chinese Academy of Sciences (CAS)
