= Liang Jincai =

Chinese aerospace engineer (1927–2023)

- 梁晋才
- Born: 17 December 1927; Beijing, China
- Died: 17 January 2023 (aged 95); Beijing, China
- Education: Peking University; Bauman Moscow State Technical University
- Scientific career
- Fields: Aerospace automatic control
- Workplaces: Shanghai Academy of Spaceflight Technology

Chinese name
- Simplified Chinese: 梁晋才
- Traditional Chinese: 梁晉才
Transcriptions
Standard Mandarin
- Hanyu Pinyin: Liáng Jìncái

Liang Jincai (Chinese: 梁晋才; 17 December 1927 – 17 January 2023) was a Chinese aerospace engineer, and an academician of the Chinese Academy of Engineering.

== Biography ==
Liang was born in Beijing, on 17 December 1927, while his ancestral home is in Nanhai District of Foshan, Guangdong. In 1946, he entered Peking University, where he majored in the Department of Electrical Engineering. After graduating in 1950, he taught at the Department of Telecommunications, Beijing Railway University, and moved to Harbin Railway University two years later. In November 1957, he was sent to study at Bauman Moscow State Technical University at the expense of the Communist government, earning a vice-doctorate degree in 1961. He returned to China in September 1961 and continued to teach at Beijing Railway University.

In June 1962, Liang was despatched to the 2nd Branch of the 5th Research Institute of the Ministry of Defense, and was transferred to the 22nd Design Institute of Shanghai Second Electromechanical Bureau (now Shanghai Academy of Spaceflight Technology) in September 1965.

Liang died on 17 January 2023, at the age of 95.

== Honours and awards ==
- 1990 State Science and Technology Progress Award (First Class) for developing a missile system
- 1996 State Science and Technology Progress Award (Third Class) for developing a missile system
- November 1997 Member of the Chinese Academy of Engineering (CAE)
