= Sun Valley (film) =

- Film poster
- Directed by: He Ping
- Produced by: Fung Kwok Ma
- Starring: Zhang Fengyi
- Cinematography: Yang Lun
- Edited by: Hong Yuan
- Music by: Zhao Jiping
- Production companies: China Film Group Corporation; Xi'an Film Studio
- Distributed by: Media Asia Distribution
- Release date: May 30, 1995 (Hong Kong)
- Running time: 114 minutes
- Countries: China; Hong Kong
- Language: Mandarin

Sun Valley (Chinese: 日光峡谷; pinyin: Rì guāng xiá gǔ) is a 1995 Chinese film that was directed by He Ping. Along with his film, Swordsmen in Double Flag Town, Sun Valley is considered one of He Ping's "Chinese westerns." The film stars Zhang Fengyi as The Avenger, a mysterious hero who arrives at the eponymous valley to await his enemies.

Sun Valley was a Chinese-Hong Kong co-production between the China Film Co-Production Corporation, Xi'an Film Studio, Media Asia and Huanya Film Corporation. It was his first film funded by outside sources. The film was entered into the 46th Berlin International Film Festival where it won an Honourable Mention.

== Cast ==
- Zhang Fengyi as The Avenger.
- Ku Feng as Old Man, an old warrior who has settled in the valley to become a devout Buddhist.
- Wang Xueqi as Black Bull.
- Yuan Chen as Yellow Skin.

== Release ==
The film was released on May 30, 1995 in Hong Kong by Media Asia Distribution, and later in the United States by Miramax on television. To date, it has not been released on DVD and Blu-ray. It has only been released in the VCD format.
