= Mycoplasma pneumonia =

- Specialty: Infectious disease, pulmonology
- Complications: Stevens–Johnson syndrome, autoimmune hemolytic anemia, cardiovascular diseases, encephalitis, Guillain–Barré syndrome

Mycoplasma pneumonia (also known as Mycoplasma pneumoniae pneumonia, MPP) is a form of bacterial pneumonia caused by the bacterium Mycoplasma pneumoniae. It is a cause of community-acquired pneumonia. It is sometimes called walking pneumonia.

== Signs and symptoms ==
M. pneumoniae is known to cause a host of symptoms such as primary atypical pneumonia, tracheobronchitis, and upper respiratory tract disease. Primary atypical pneumonia is one of the most severe types of manifestation, with tracheobronchitis being the most common symptom and another 15% of cases, usually adults, remain asymptomatic. Symptomatic infections tend to develop over a period of several days and manifestation of pneumonia can be confused with a number of other bacterial pathogens and conditions that cause pneumonia. Tracheobronchitis is most common in children due to a reduced immune system capacity, and up to 18% of infected children require hospitalization. Common mild symptoms include sore throat, wheezing and coughing, fever, headache, rhinitis, myalgia and feelings of unease, in which symptom intensity and duration can be limited by early treatment with antibiotics. Rarely, M. pneumoniae pneumonia results in death due to lesions and ulceration of the epithelial lining, pulmonary edema, and bronchiolitis obliterans.

Non-pulmonary symptoms such as autoimmune responses, central nervous system complications, and dermatological disorders have been associated with M. pneumoniae infections in up to 25% of cases. Hemolysis occurs regularly, but often remains asymptomatic (fatigue, Raynaud syndrome only in cold season), as well as carditis, joint disease, and gastrointestinal disease.

== Cause ==
Mycoplasma pneumoniae is spread through respiratory droplet and aerosol transmission.

== Pathophysiology ==
Once attached to the mucosa of a host organism, M. pneumoniae extracts nutrients, grows, and reproduces by binary fission. Attachment sites include the upper and lower respiratory tract, causing pharyngitis, bronchitis, and pneumonia. The infection caused by this bacterium is called atypical pneumonia because of its protracted course and lack of sputum production and wealth of non-pulmonary symptoms. Chronic Mycoplasma infections have been implicated in the pathogenesis of rheumatoid arthritis and other rheumatological diseases.

Mycoplasma atypical pneumonia can be complicated by Stevens–Johnson syndrome, autoimmune hemolytic anemia, cardiovascular diseases, encephalitis, or Guillain–Barré syndrome.

== Diagnosis ==
Diagnosis of Mycoplasma pneumoniae infections is complicated by its associated delayed onset of symptoms and the similarity of symptoms to other pulmonary conditions. Often, M. pneumoniae infections are diagnosed as other conditions, and occasionally, non-pathogenic mycoplasmas present in the respiratory tract are mistaken for M. pneumoniae.

Historically, the diagnosis of M. pneumoniae infections was made based on the presence of cold agglutinins (though this method should be used cautiously due to its mediocre and poor sensitivity and specificity, respectively). Additionally, the ability of the infected material to reduce tetrazolium was also considered. While laboratory testing is crucial for causative diagnosis, these methods are more practical for epidemiological studies than for patient diagnosis. Culture tests are rarely used as diagnostic tools; rather immunoblotting, immunofluorescent staining, hemadsorption tests, tetrazolium reduction, metabolic inhibition tests, serological assays, and polymerase chain reaction (PCR) are used for diagnosis and characterization of bacterial pneumonic infections. PCR is the most rapid and effective way to determine the presence of M. pneumoniae, however the procedure does not indicate the activity or viability of the cells present. Enzyme immunoassay (EIA) serological assays are the most common method of M. pneumoniae detection used in patient diagnosis due to the low cost and relatively short testing time. One drawback of serology is that viable organisms are required, which may overstate the severity of infection. Neither of these methods, along with others, has been available to medical professionals in a rapid, efficient and inexpensive enough form to be used in routine diagnosis, leading to decreased ability of physicians to diagnose M. pneumoniae infections.

== Treatment ==
The treatment recommendations for MPP vary depending on patient age, disease severity, and local antibiotic resistance rates. Treatment often involves a combination of antibiotics and supportive care. Other treatments, like corticosteroids, are indicated in refractory (non-resolving) cases. While the disease is often self-limiting, antibiotic treatment may still be helpful.

=== Antibiotic Treatment ===
Macrolides are generally the first choice of antibiotic in children and adults. In cases where macrolides have failed, or the disease is more severe, tetracyclines and fluoroquinolone antibiotics are recommended. Fluoroquinolone and tetracycline antibiotics have a high risk of side effects in children, but can still be used.

Common macrolides are azithromycin, erythromycin, and clarithromycin. Common tetracyclines are doxycyline and minocycline.

Antibiotics that target the cell wall do not work because M. pneumoniae lacks a cell wall. This means that antibiotics like β-lactams (e.g. penicillin and amoxicillin), glycopeptides, sulfonamides, trimethoprim, polymixins, nalidixic acid, and rifampin are completely ineffective.

Since pneumonia caused by M. pneumonia might not be quickly differentiated from other forms of pneumonia, some hospitals recommend an empirical antibiotic treatment strategy, one where a combination of antibiotics is used to treat the majority of possible causes, prioritizing the rapid administration of antibiotics. In this case, UCSF recommends that providers take into account disease severity (inpatient vs outpatient treatment, complications like shock), local antibiotic resistance patterns, as well as MRSA, pseudomonas, and multi-drug resistant pathogen risk factors when deciding on an antibiotic regimen.

The majority of antibiotics used to treat M. pneumoniae infections are targeted at bacterial rRNA in ribosomal complexes, including macrolides, tetracycline, ketolides, and fluoroquinolone, many of which can be administered orally. Macrolides are capable of reducing hyperresponsiveness and protecting the epithelial lining from oxidative and structural damage, however they are capable only of inhibiting bacteria (bacteriostatic) and are not able to cause bacterial cell death. The most common macrolides used in the treatment of infected children in Japan are erythromycin and clarithromycin, which inhibit bacterial protein synthesis by binding 23S rRNA.

=== Anti-inflammatory Treatments ===
Corticosteroids (e.g. prednisone or dexamethasone) are sometimes recommended in adults and children, especially in severe cases. Other studies have not found corticosteroids to be helpful. Additionally, some high-dose steroid therapies have shown to reverse neurological effects in children with complicated infections.

== Prevention ==
Transmission of Mycoplasma pneumoniae infections is difficult to limit because of the several day period of infection before symptoms appear. The lack of proper diagnostic tools and effective treatment for the bacterium also contribute to the outbreak of infection. Using network theory, Meyers et al. analyzed the transmission of M. pneumoniae infections and developed control strategies based on the created model. They determined that cohorting patients is less effective due to the long incubation period, and so the best method of prevention is to limit caregiver–patient interactions and reduce the movement of caregivers to multiple hospital wards.

As with all airborne disease, airborne precautions and routine indoor air management tools are likely to reduce transmission.

Vaccine design for M. pneumoniae has been focused primarily on prevention of host cell attachment, which would prevent initiation of cytotoxicity and subsequent symptoms. To date, vaccines targeted at the P1 adhesin have shown no reduction in the onset of infection, and some vaccine trials resulted in worsened symptoms due to immune system sensitization. Recent experiments in mouse models have linked this phenomenon to immune system sensitization by the lipid moieties of M. pneumoniae lipoproteins. Introduction of peptides that block adhesion receptors on the surface of the host cell may also be able to prevent attachment of M. pneumoniae.

== Epidemiology ==
The prevalence of mycoplasma pneumonia (MP) is greater among children than adults. Many adults remain asymptomatic, while children typically do not.

The incidence of disease does not appear to be related to season or geography; however, infection tends to occur more frequently during the summer and fall months when other respiratory pathogens are less prevalent. Reinfection and epidemic cycling is thought to be a result of P1 adhesin subtype variation. Approximately 40% of community-acquired pneumonia is due to M. pneumoniae infections, with children and elderly individuals being most susceptible, however no personal risk factors for acquiring M. pneumoniae induced pneumonia have been determined. Transmission of M. pneumoniae can only occur through close contact and exchange of aerosols by coughing due to the increased susceptibility of the cell wall-lacking organism to desiccation. Outbreaks of M. pneumoniae infections tend to occur within groups of people in close and prolonged proximity, including schools, institutions, military bases, and households.

Rates of Mycoplasma pneumonia in all global community-acquired pneumonia (CAP) cases range from 10-15%. The rate of Mycoplasma pneumonia in adults with CAP is estimated to be 15%, and the rate of in children with CAP has been reported at 27.4%. The rates of M. pneumoniae among hospitalized CAP cases are 35% in adults and 24% in children. Rates of hospitalizations among adults increase with age. M. pneumoniae has been shown to act as a trigger for other lung diseases.

Cases of M. pneumoniae may be unreported due to patients with few or no symptoms not seeking medical care. On a global scale, differences in lab techniques and sampling methods can also impact the reported number of cases.

M. pneumoniae can be spread by droplets and aerosols, typically from an infected person coughing or sneezing. If a person still has a cough, they can remain infectious even after a majority of other symptoms disappear.

Outbreaks follow a 3–7 year cycle. It is thought that factors such as climate, season, and geography have little impact on rates of M. pneumoniae. Cases in the United States are more prevalent in the late summer and early fall, while other regions report that seasons did not affect case rate. It is thought that weather events like El Niño can impact the yearly cycles and seasonal difference between continents.

== See also ==
- Mycoplasmal pneumonia of swine
