= Book of Southern Tang (Lu You book) =

Chinese history book, c. 1184

陸氏南唐書 (Lù Shì Nán Táng Shū)
- Author: Lu You
- Original title: 南唐書 (Nán Táng Shū)
- Language: Classical Chinese
- Genre: Chinese historiography
- Publication date: 1184
- Publication place: China (Song Dynasty)
- Original text: 南唐書 (Nán Táng Shū) at Chinese Wikisource

The Book of Southern Tang, or sometimes called Lu's Book of Southern Tang (陸氏南唐書) to distinguish it from the earlier Ma's Book of Southern Tang, was a Chinese historiography book written by Lu You in c. 1184. It has 18 chapters. In 1328 under the Yuan Dynasty, Qi Guang added a phonetic commentary chapter.

It is considered the most authoritative book on Southern Tang history.
