= He Ping (director) =

Chinese film director (1957–2023)

- 何平
- Photo Portrait of He Ping
- Born: 7 May 1957; Shanxi, China
- Died: 10 January 2023 (aged 65); Beijing, China
- Occupation: Film director
- Years active: 1980s–2023
- Awards: Golden Rooster Awards – Best Director: 1994 Red Firecracker, Green Firecracker

He Ping (Chinese: 何平; pinyin: Hé Píng; 7 May 1957 – 10 January 2023) was a Chinese film director, screenwriter, and producer born in Shanxi whose main filmography consists of a hybrid genre of Western-wuxia movies. He made three movies along this genre - Swordsmen in Double Flag Town (1991), Sun Valley (1995) and Warriors of Heaven and Earth (2004).

== Personal life and background ==
He Ping's mother, Yuan Yuehua (袁月华), was an accomplished director and the female lead in Bridge (1949), the first feature film produced after the founding of the People's Republic of China. He Ping's father, He Wenjin (何文今), was the deputy director of Beijing Film Studio and the director of Beijing Science and Educational Film Studio. He was an ethnic Manchu whose ancestors were members of the Blue Banners.

He Ping died in Beijing, China on 10 January 2023, at the age of 65.

== Biography ==
He Ping began his directorial career in the 1980s, directing stage productions and documentary films. By the late 1980s, He transferred to the Xi'an Film Studio, where he began directing fiction films, including We Are the World and Kawashima Yoshiko a film based on the story of the Manchurian-Japanese royal, Kawashima Yoshiko. In the 1990s, He directed two major Chinese Westerns, Swordsmen in Double Flag Town and Sun Valley, and the historical drama Red Firecracker, Green Firecracker. Swordsmen in Double Flag Town went on to win the Grand Prize at the 3rd Yubari International Fantastic Film Festival in February 1992. Sun Valley was entered into the 46th Berlin International Film Festival where it won an Honourable Mention.

In the 2000s, He Ping struck success with his 2004 adventure film Warriors of Heaven and Earth, starring Jiang Wen. He Ping followed this with another historical action film, Wheat, starring Fan Bingbing, which was released in 2009. In 2015, he directed the film The Promised Land, which received an honorable mention from the Platform jury at the 2015 Toronto International Film Festival.

In addition to being a director, He Ping produced numerous feature films such as The Dream Factory, Big Shot's Funeral, and Kekexili: Mountain Patrol. He also was one of the founding members and the Secretary-general of the China Film Directors' Guild.

== Filmography ==
| Year | English title | Chinese title | Director | Writer | Producer | Notes |
|---|---|---|---|---|---|---|
| 1988 | We Are the World | 我们是世界 | Yes | Yes | No | |
| 1989 | Kawashima Yoshiko | 川岛芳子 | Yes | Yes | No | |
| 1991 | Swordsmen in Double Flag Town | 双旗镇刀客 | Yes | Yes | No | Japan Yobari International Film Festival Best and Fantasy Adventure Film Awards; Berlin International Film Festival Young Director; Hong Kong Film Awards for Best Mandarin Slice 10; Shanghai Critic-named China's Top Photographer Award |
| 1994 | Red Firecracker, Green Firecracker | 炮打双灯 | Yes | Yes | No | Hawaii International Film Festival Best Film; Golden Rooster Award for Best Director; Golden Rooster Award for Best Co-produced Film; Golden Rooster Award for Best Art Direction; Taiwan Critics Award |
| 1995 | Sun Valley | 日光峡谷 | Yes | Yes | No | 46th Berlin International Film Festival Honorable Mention |
| 1997 | The Dream Factory | 甲方乙方 | No | No | Yes | |
| 1998 | Be There or Be Square | 不见不散 | No | No | Yes | |
| 2001 | Big Shot's Funeral | 大腕 | No | No | Yes | |
| 2002 | The Missing Gun | 寻枪 | No | No | Yes | |
| 2003 | Cell Phone | 手机 | No | No | Yes | |
| 2004 | Kekexili: Mountain Patrol | 可可西里 | No | No | Yes | |
| 2004 | Warriors of Heaven and Earth | 天地英雄 | Yes | Yes | No | |
| 2009 | Wheat | 麦田 | Yes | Yes | No | |
| 2015 | The Promised Land | 回到被爱的每一天 | Yes | Yes | No | 2015 Toronto International Film Festival Platform Jury Honorable Mention |
