= Warriors of Heaven and Earth =

2003 Chinese film by He Ping

- United States theatrical release poster
- 天地英雄
- Directed by: He Ping
- Written by: He Ping; Zhang Rui
- Produced by: Song Dai; Wang Zhonglei; Chen Kuo-fu; Rita Fung; Hou Shengjun; Zhou Fengying; Yang Ge
- Starring: Jiang Wen; Kiichi Nakai; Zhao Wei; Wang Xueqi
- Cinematography: Zhao Fei; Zheng Hua; Wang Min
- Edited by: Kong Jinlei
- Music by: A. R. Rahman
- Production companies: Columbia Pictures Film Production Asia; Huayi Brothers
- Distributed by: Huayi Brothers
- Release date: October 16, 2003
- Running time: 114 minutes
- Country: China
- Language: Mandarin

Warriors of Heaven and Earth (Chinese: 天地英雄) is a 2003 Chinese action adventure film directed by He Ping. The film's notable cinematography captures a wide range of landscapes across Xinjiang. It was China's official entry for the Academy Award for Best Foreign Language Film, though it did not get nominated.

== Synopsis ==
The film is set in western China around 700 AD at the height of the Tang Empire when trade and cultural exchanges are taking place via the Silk Road between the Chinese and their counterparts in the west. Lieutenant Li, a former Tang army officer, has become a fugitive after defying orders to kill unarmed Göktürk prisoners-of-war, most of whom are the elderly, women and children. Years later, he joins a caravan carrying a Buddhist relic and protects them from raiders led by Master An, who has been hired by the Göktürk ruler to seize the relic.

Lai Xi, a Japanese emissary sent to the Tang Empire, has received a promise from the emperor to allow him to return to Japan if he helps to hunt down and kill the fugitive Li. Lai tracks down Li and, in a twist of fate, decides to help Li escort the caravan carrying the relic to the Tang capital, Chang'an. Both men agree to settle their differences in a duel in Chang'an once they have completed the mission.

== Cast ==
- Jiang Wen as Lieutenant Li
- Kiichi Nakai as Emissary Lai Xi
- Zhao Wei as Wenzhu
- Wang Xueqi as Master An
- Hasi Bagen as Cao Jian
- He Tao as Ma Gun
- Lau Lei-nin as Wu Laoer
- Wang Deshun as Old Diehard
- Li Haibin as Zao Zimo
- Zhou Yun as Monk Juehui
- Lee Wai as Di Hu / Salamander
- Yang Haiquan as Baldy
- Wong Hiu as the Emperor
- Sang Baozhong as General Wen

== Soundtrack ==
Warriors of Heaven and Earth: Original Motion Picture Soundtrack

Soundtrack album by A. R. Rahman
- Released: October 3, 2003 (China); May 4, 2004 (India)
- Recorded: Panchathan Record Inn; Sahara Sound Ltd. Rudolfinumand Sono Studios
- Genre: World Music
- Length: 36:32
- Label: Sony Classical
- Producer: A.R. Rahman

A. R. Rahman chronology
Boys (2003)	Warriors of Heaven and Earth: Original Motion Picture Soundtrack (2003)	Enakku 20 Unakku 18 / Nee Manasu Naaku Telusu (2003)

The original score was composed by Indian composer A. R. Rahman. Warriors of Heaven and Earth: Original Motion Picture Soundtrack was released on CD featuring 14 tracks, which include excerpts from the score and 1 theme song, "Warriors in Peace", sung by Taiwanese singer Jolin Tsai. Following the film's release, the score and soundtrack were released in one album separately, under the title Between Heaven and Earth. The album also include the theme song, "Warriors in Peace", in two languages, which are the Hindi version by Sadhana Sargam and English version by Sunitha Sarathy.

While signing the project, Rahman was working with violinist Joshua Bell on compositions based on poems by the Persian poet Rumi. This project was later cancelled. The score is completely acoustic with symphonic pieces and relatively little electronic sounds have been used. Performers of the score include The Czech Film Orchestra and Chinese soloists in Hong Kong. Other instruments, including the erhu, flute, duduk, dizi, taiko drums are featured.

Track listing

Song	Duration	Artist
"The Golden Era"	3:56	Instrumental
"Warriors in Peace (Chinese Version)"	4:31	Jolin Tsai
"Water"	3:52	Instrumental
"Horses"	2:27	Instrumental
"Mountains"	1:49	Instrumental
"Dacoit Duel"	3:26	Instrumental
"Lai Chi"	1:31	Instrumental
"Buddha's Remains"	2:40	Instrumental
"Blue Light"	2:23	Instrumental
"The Monk and The Miracle"	4:05	Instrumental
"Desert Storm"	5:19	Instrumental
"Warriors of Heaven and Earth (Instrumental)"	4:27	Instrumental

== Awards and nominations ==
11th Beijing Student Film Festival

- Won: Best Visual Effect
- Won: Favorite Actress (Zhao Wei)
- Won: Favorite Actor (Jiang Wen)

27th Hundred Flowers Awards

- Nominated: Best Film
- Nominated: Best Actress (Zhao Wei)
- Nominated: Best Actor (Jiang Wen)
- Nominated: Best Actor (Wang Xueqi)

24th Golden Rooster Awards

- Nominated: Best Supporting Actor (Wang Xueqi)

== See also ==
- List of historical drama films of Asia
