= Qian Yitai =

Chinese chemist (1941–2023)

- 钱逸泰
- Qian Yitai
- Born: 3 January 1941; Wuxi County, Jiangsu, China
- Died: 14 January 2023 (aged 82); Hefei, Anhui, China
- Education: Shandong University
- Scientific career
- Fields: Inorganic chemistry
- Workplaces: University of Science and Technology of China

Chinese name
- Simplified Chinese: 钱逸泰
- Traditional Chinese: 錢逸泰
Transcriptions
Standard Mandarin
- Hanyu Pinyin: Qián Yìtài

Qian Yitai, FRS (Chinese: 钱逸泰; 3 January 1941 – 14 January 2023) was a Chinese chemist who was a professor at University of Science and Technology of China.

Qian was born in Zhongqiao, Wuxi on 3 January 1941. After graduating from Suzhou No.2 Middle School, he earned his bachelor's degree from Department of Chemistry, Shandong University in 1962. He joined the faculty of University of Science and Technology of China (USTC), and was later appointed Dean of College of Chemistry and Materials Science. From 1982 to 1993, he visited several US universities, such as Brown University and Purdue University. In 1997, he was elected as an academician of Chinese Academy of Sciences.

Qian's research mainly focuses on nanomaterials and superconducting materials. In 1996 his group developed benzene-thermal synthetic method to nanocrystalline GaN. In 1998, they reported the preparation of diamond through pyrolysis process of catalytic reduction. Qian also used crystal chemical method to prepare many kinds of superconducting materials. Among Qian's notable students Li Yadong and Xie Yi were also elected as members of CAS.

Qian died on 14 January 2023, at the age of 82.

== Honours and awards ==
- 1997 Member of the Chinese Academy of Sciences (CAS)
- 2008 Fellow of the Royal Society
- 2015 Science and Technology Progress Award of the Ho Leung Ho Lee Foundation
