= Li Zhao (military engineer) =

Chinese engineer (1940–2023)

- 李钊
- Born: 3 February 1940; Wuji County, Hebei, China
- Died: 24 January 2023 (aged 82); China
- Education: Harbin Military Academy of Engineering; PLA Army Engineering University
- Scientific career
- Fields: Mine blasting
- Workplaces: People's Liberation Army General Armaments Department

Chinese name
- Simplified Chinese: 李钊
- Traditional Chinese: 李釗
Transcriptions
Standard Mandarin
- Hanyu Pinyin: Lǐ Zhāo

Li Zhao (Chinese: 李钊; 3 February 1940 – 24 January 2023) was a Chinese engineer in the fields of mine blasting, and an academician of the Chinese Academy of Engineering.

He was a representative of the 13th National Congress of the Chinese Communist Party.

== Biography ==
Li was born in Wuji County, Hebei, on 3 February 1940, to Li Guanying (李冠英), a textile expert, and Xue Hua (薛华), a housewife. He attended Shijiazhuang No. 1 High School, and graduated from Harbin Military Academy of Engineering (now National University of Defense Technology) and the PLA Army Engineering University.

After university in 1964, Li was despatched to the People's Liberation Army General Armaments Department, where he was promoted to major general (shaojiang) in 1994.

On 24 January 2023, he died at the age of 82.

== Honours and awards ==
- 1985 State Science and Technology Progress Award (First Class)
- 1999 Member of the Chinese Academy of Engineering (CAE)
