= Book of Southern Tang (Ma Ling book) =

12th-century Chinese history book

馬氏南唐書 (Mǎ Shì Nán Táng Shū)
- Author: Ma Ling
- Original title: 南唐書 (Nán Táng Shū)
- Language: Classical Chinese
- Genre: Chinese historiography
- Publication date: early 12th century
- Publication place: China (Song dynasty)
- Original text: 南唐書 (Nán Táng Shū) at Chinese Wikisource

The Book of Southern Tang, or sometimes called Ma's Book of Southern Tang (馬氏南唐書) to distinguish it from the later Lu's Book of Southern Tang, was a Chinese history book on the Five Dynasties and Ten Kingdoms period state of Southern Tang. Containing 30 chapters, it was written by Ma Ling in the early 12th century. Ma Ling's grandfather Ma Yuankang (馬元康) had been a resident of Southern Tang's capital Jinling (金陵; modern Nanjing, Jiangsu).
