= Nuclear weapons delivery =

Type of explosive arms

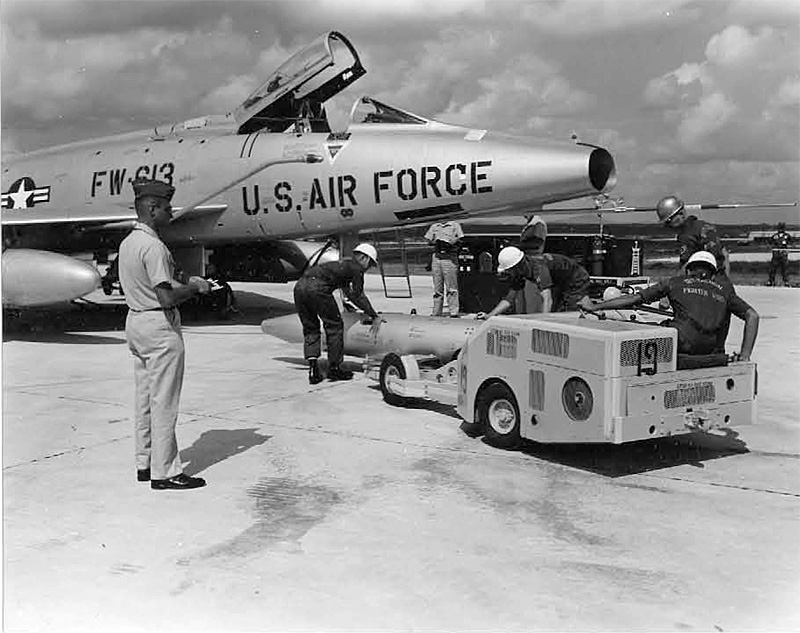
A B28 nuclear bomb being transported to a United States Air Force F-100 Super Sabre at Kadena Air Base in Japan

Nuclear weapons delivery is the technology and systems used to place a nuclear weapon at the position of detonation, on or near its target. All nine nuclear states have developed some form of medium- to long-range delivery system for their nuclear weapons. Alongside improvement of weapons, their development and deployment played a key role in the nuclear arms race.

Strategic nuclear weapons are intended primarily as part of a doctrine of deterrence by threatening large targets, such as cities or military installations. These are generally delivered by some combination of land-based intercontinental ballistic missiles, sea-based submarine-launched ballistic missiles, and air-based strategic bombers carrying gravity bombs or cruise missiles. The possession of all three is known as a nuclear triad.

Tactical nuclear weapons are intended for battlefield usage and/or destroying specific military, communications, or infrastructure targets, and generally have lower yields. Delivery systems developed for them include shorter-range ground-, air-, and sea-launched missiles, nuclear artillery, nuclear land mines, nuclear torpedoes, and nuclear depth charges, but they have become less salient since the end of the Cold War.

Delivery systems were occasionally tested with live warheads as a provocative form of nuclear weapons testing and live fire exercise.

Detection and interception of delivery vehicles is a key part of nuclear deterrence. For detection, early-warning radar and satellite systems were developed. For interception, anti-ballistic missile and air defense systems were developed, some of which were themselves nuclear-armed. Warhead countermeasures developed against these include decoys, multiple independently targetable reentry maneuverable reentry vehicles and the use of high-altitude early detonations to cause radar nuclear blackout.

Since the end of the Cold War, nuclear weapons delivery has been advanced by stealth bombers and hypersonic weapons. According to the Council on Strategic Risks, 261 unique nuclear weapons systems have been developed by the five NPT-recognized nuclear-weapons states alone, with 47 in use by them as of 2025.

== Nuclear triad ==
A nuclear triad refers to a strategic nuclear arsenal which consists of three components, traditionally strategic bombers, intercontinental ballistic missiles (ICBMs), and submarine-launched ballistic missiles (SLBMs). The purpose of having a three-branched nuclear capability is to significantly reduce the possibility that an enemy could destroy all of a nation's nuclear forces in a first-strike attack; this, in turn, ensures a credible threat of a second strike, and thus increases a nation's nuclear deterrence.

=== Country comparison ===
This table uses the following identifiers:

- — This country has a nuclear mission assigned to this delivery system.
- — This country has never had a nuclear mission assigned to this delivery system.
- — It is unclear if this country has a nuclear mission assigned to this delivery system.
- — This country is developing this delivery system with a nuclear mission envisioned.
- — This country previously assigned a nuclear mission to this delivery system.

Estimated nuclear weapons delivery systems by country, 2026 (Note: Many countries formerly operated a wider range of strategic and especially tactical systems, especially during the Cold War. While most of these are no longer operational, Russia is the only country as of 2025 believed to operate nuclear-armed anti-ballistic missiles, surface-to-air missiles, anti-ship missiles anti-submarine weapons, depth bombs, and torpedoes.)
Reference										
Basing	Type	(United States)	(Russia)	(United Kingdom)	(France)	(China)	(Israel)	(India)	(Pakistan)	(North Korea)
Land	Intercontinental ballistic missile									
Land	Intermediate-range ballistic missile									
Land	Medium-range ballistic missile									
Land	Short-range ballistic missile									
Land	Tactical ballistic missile									
Land	Ground-launched cruise missile									
Sea	Sea-launched ballistic missile									
Sea	Sea-launched cruise missile									
Air	Air-launched ballistic missile									
Air	Air-launched cruise missile									
Air	Gravity bomb									
Depth bomb										

== Main delivery mechanisms ==
=== Gravity bomb ===
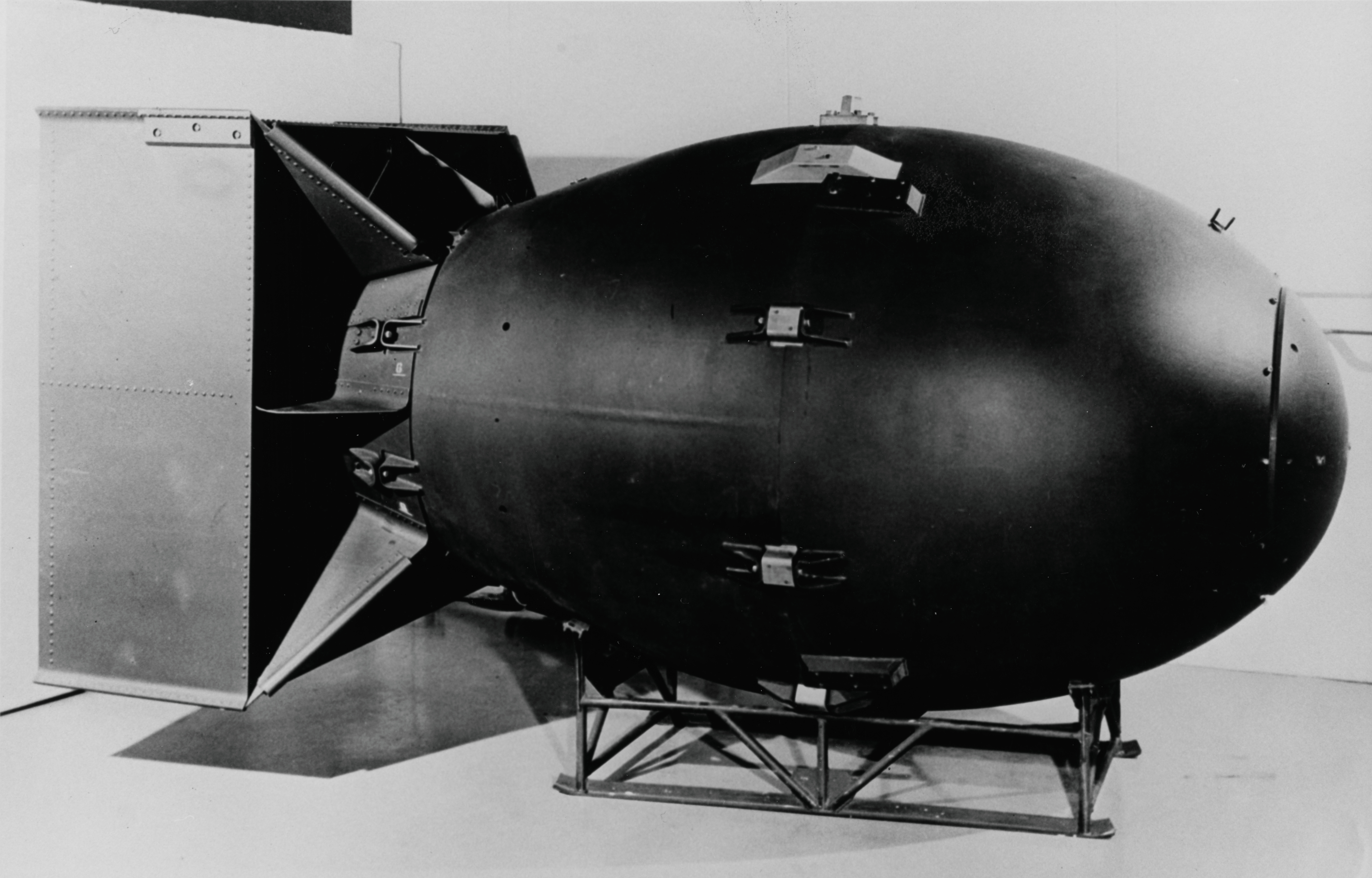
The "Little Boy" and the "Fat Man" devices were large and cumbersome gravity bombs.

Historically the first method of nuclear weapons delivery, and the method used in the twin instances of nuclear warfare in history, was a gravity bomb dropped by a plane. In the years leading up to the development and deployment of nuclear-armed missiles, nuclear bombs represented the most practical means of nuclear weapons delivery; even today, and especially with the decommissioning of nuclear missiles, aerial bombing remains the primary means of offensive nuclear weapons delivery, and the majority of US nuclear warheads are represented in bombs, although some are in the form of missiles.

Gravity bombs are designed to be dropped from planes, which requires that the weapon be able to withstand vibrations and changes in air temperature and pressure during the course of a flight. Early weapons often had a removable core for safety, known as in flight insertion (IFI) cores, being inserted or assembled by the air crew during flight. They had to meet safety conditions, to prevent accidental detonation or dropping. A variety of types also had to have a fuse to initiate detonation. US nuclear weapons that met these criteria are designated by the letter "B" followed, without a hyphen, by the sequential number of the "physics package" it contains. The "B61", for example, was the primary bomb in the US arsenal for decades.

Various air-dropping techniques exist, including toss bombing, parachute-retarded delivery, and laydown modes, intended to give the dropping aircraft time to escape the ensuing blast.

The earliest gravity nuclear bombs (Little Boy and Fat Man) of the United States could only be carried, during the era of their creation, by the special Silverplate limited production (65 airframes by 1947) version of the B-29 Superfortress. The next generation of weapons were still so big and heavy that they could only be carried by bombers such as the six/ten-engined, seventy-meter wingspan B-36 Peacemaker, the eight jet-engined B-52 Stratofortress, and jet-powered British RAF V bombers, but by the mid-1950s smaller weapons had been developed that could be carried and deployed by fighter-bombers. Modern nuclear gravity bombs are so small that they can be carried by (relatively) small multirole fighter aircraft, such as the single-engined F-16 and F-35.

=== Missile ===
==== Ballistic ====
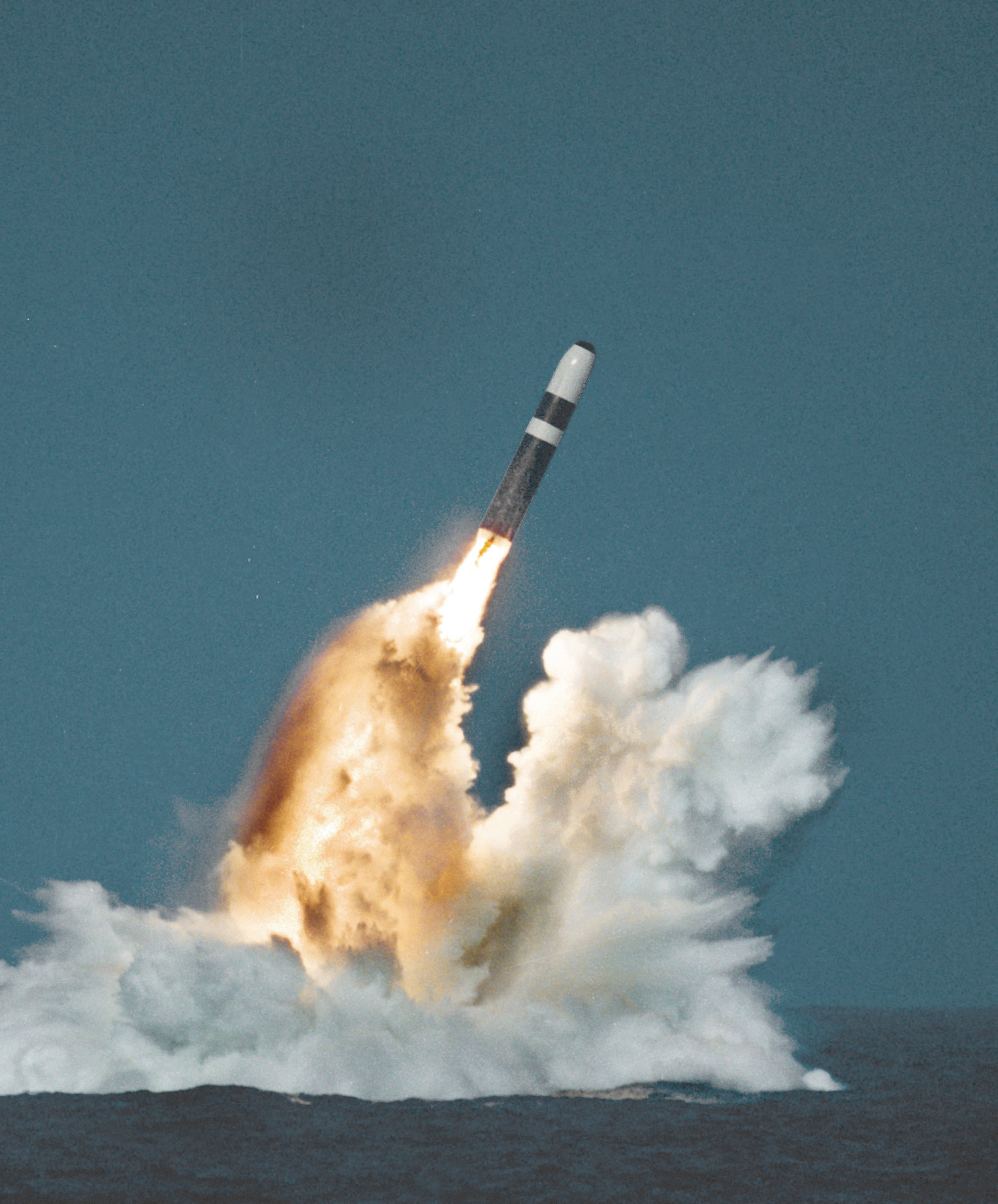
Trident II SLBM launched by Royal Navy Vanguard-class submarine

Missiles using a ballistic trajectory deliver a warhead over the horizon; in the case of the most capable of these, classified as intercontinental ballistic missiles (ICBMs) (and submarine-launched ballistic missiles (SLBMs) if transported by submarine), they can reach distances of nearly tens of thousands of kilometers. Most ballistic missiles exit the Earth's atmosphere and re-enter it in their sub-orbital spaceflight. Ballistic missiles aren't always nuclear armed, but the conspicuous and alarming nature of their launch often precludes arming ICBMs and SLBMs, the most capable classes of ballistic missiles, with conventional warheads.

Placement of nuclear missiles on the low Earth orbit has been banned by the Outer Space Treaty as early as 1967. Also, the eventual Soviet Fractional Orbital Bombardment System (FOBS) that served a similar purpose—it was just deliberately designed to deorbit before completing a full circle—was phased out in January 1983 in compliance with the SALT II treaty.

An ICBM is more than 20 times as fast as a bomber and more than 10 times as fast as a fighter plane, and also flying at a much higher altitude, and therefore more difficult to defend against. ICBMs can also be fired quickly in the event of a surprise attack.

Early ballistic missiles carried a single warhead, often of megaton-range yield. Because of the limited accuracy of the missiles, this kind of high yield was considered necessary to ensure a particular target's destruction. Since the 1970s modern ballistic weapons have seen the development of far more accurate targeting technologies, particularly due to improvements in inertial guidance systems. This set the stage for smaller warheads in the hundreds-of-kilotons-range yield, and consequently for ICBMs having multiple independently targetable reentry vehicles (MIRV). Advances in technology have enabled a single missile to launch a payload containing several warheads; the number of which depended on the missile's and payload bus' design. MIRVs has a number of advantages over a missile with a single warhead. With few additional costs, it allows a single missile to strike multiple targets, or to inflict maximum damage on a single target by attacking it with multiple warheads. It makes anti-ballistic missile defense even more difficult, and even less economically viable, than before.

Missile warheads in the American arsenal are indicated by the letter "W"; for example, the W61 missile warhead would have the same physics package as the B61 gravity bomb described above, but it would have different environmental requirements, and different safety requirements since it would not be crew-tended after launch and remain atop a missile for a great length of time.

While the first modern ballistic missile designed is the basis of contemporary rocket- and missilery, it never carried a nuclear warhead. The first ICBM ever designed was the Soviet R-7.

The first SLBM-carrying submarine was also Soviet; the prototype Modified Zulu-class and the mass-produced Golf-class ballistic missile submarines carried their SLBMs in their sails, but these pioneering designs had to surface to launch their ballistic missiles. The Americans responded with the first "modern design" of ballistic missile subs; the George Washington-class, which launched the Polaris SLBM. The subsequent arms-race culminated in some of the largest submarines ever designed; the Trident-armed 170-meter long Ohio-class submarine armed with 24 × 8 MIRV Trident missiles, and the battlecruiser-sized 48,000 tonne Project 941 Акула, the Typhoon-class submarine, armed with 20 R-39s with 10 MIRVs each. After the Cold War, SSBN and subsequently SLBM development have slowed, but nascent nuclear powers are building novel classes of SSB(N)s, while the established powers, all members of the United Nations Security Council, are plotting the next-generation of nuclear-powered nuclear-armed ballistic missile submarines.

Hypersonically-Gliding Warheads are a novel form of warhead to arm ballistic missiles. These maneuverable devices threaten to obsolate current forms of ABM defences, thus various nascent and established nuclear powers are racing to field examples of such systems.

==== Cruise ====
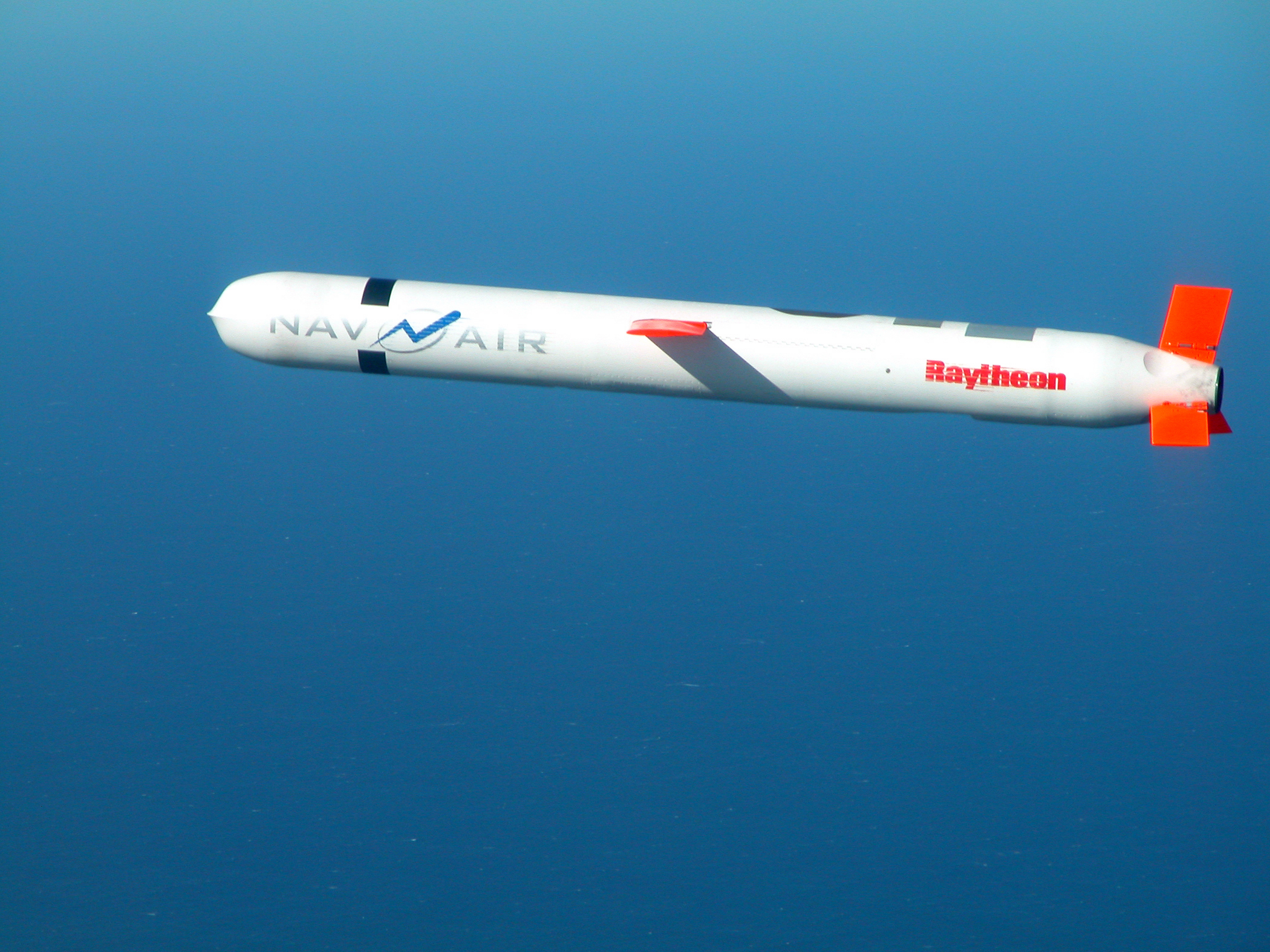
Cruise missiles have a shorter range than ICBMs. U/RGM-109E Tomahawk pictured (not nuclear capable anymore).

A cruise missile is a jet- or rocket-propelled missile that flies aerodynamically at low altitude using an automated guidance system (usually inertial navigation, sometimes supplemented by either GPS or mid-course updates from friendly forces) to make them harder to detect or intercept. Cruise missiles can carry a nuclear warhead. They have a shorter range and smaller payloads than ballistic missiles, so their warheads are smaller and less powerful.

The AGM-86 ALCM is the US Air Force's current nuclear-armed air-launched cruise missile. The ALCM is only carried on the B-52 Stratofortress which can carry 20 missiles. Thus the cruise missiles themselves can be compared with MIRV warheads. The BGM/UGM-109 Tomahawk submarine-launched cruise missile is capable of carrying nuclear warheads, but all nuclear warheads were removed following the Intermediate-Range Nuclear Forces Treaty.

Cruise missiles may also be launched from mobile launchers on the ground, and from naval ships.

There is no letter change in the US arsenal to distinguish the warheads of cruise missiles from those for ballistic missiles.

Cruise missiles, even with their lower payload, speed, and thus readiness, have a number of advantages over ballistic missiles for the purposes of delivering nuclear strikes:

- Launch of a cruise missile is difficult to detect early from satellites and other long-range means, contributing to a surprise factor of attack.
- That, coupled with the ability to actively maneuver in flight, allows for penetration of strategic anti-missile systems aimed at intercepting ballistic missiles, which typically fly on a ballistic arc without complex maneuvers.

However, cruise missiles are vulnerable to typical air-defence means as they are essentially one-use unmanned aircraft; strategies such as combat flights of fighter aircraft, or an integrated air-defence system comprising both CAP and ground-based elements, such as surface-air missiles (SAM), can be used to defend against a cruise missile attack.

Prior to the development of nuclear-armed submarine-launched ballistic missiles, the United States and the Soviet Union conducted their first at-sea deterrence patrols using modified submarines armed with very large nuclear-armed cruise missiles; The US operated various diesel-electric submarines armed with the Regulus missile, and the Soviets operated Modified Whiskey-class armed with the P-5 Пятёрка. These early nuclear-armed SSGs served for a few decades until there were enough SSBNs put in service, after which they were retired. Their spiritual successors, armed with larger amounts of more modern, smaller cruise missiles continue to serve to this day serving in a tactical strike role, although they could be rearmed with nuclear cruise-missiles if need be.

Air- or ground-launched nuclear-armed cruise missiles (sometimes even nuclear-powered) were considered by both sides early in the Cold War, but both concluded that it was impractical with the technology of the time. Nuclear-powered aircraft were considered due to the nascent aeronautical and rocketry technology of the time, especially when considering the temperamental and inefficient nature of early jet engines, which limited the range and use cases of strategic bombers and cruise missiles. Later on in the Cold War both disciplines had advanced far enough that it was feasible to create both reliable long-ranged cruise missiles and the strategic bombers able to launch them. Another arms-race began which produced contemporary post-Cold War cruise missiles and launch systems; VLS technology also allowed for surface ships to be armed with nuclear-armed cruise missiles while concealing their true payload. In 2018, the first operational nuclear-powered strategic cruise missile, the SSC-X-9 "Skyfall" (9М730 Буревестник) was revealed by Russian president Vladimir Putin. It is under development and is slated to enter service sometime in the 2020s.

=== Other delivery systems ===
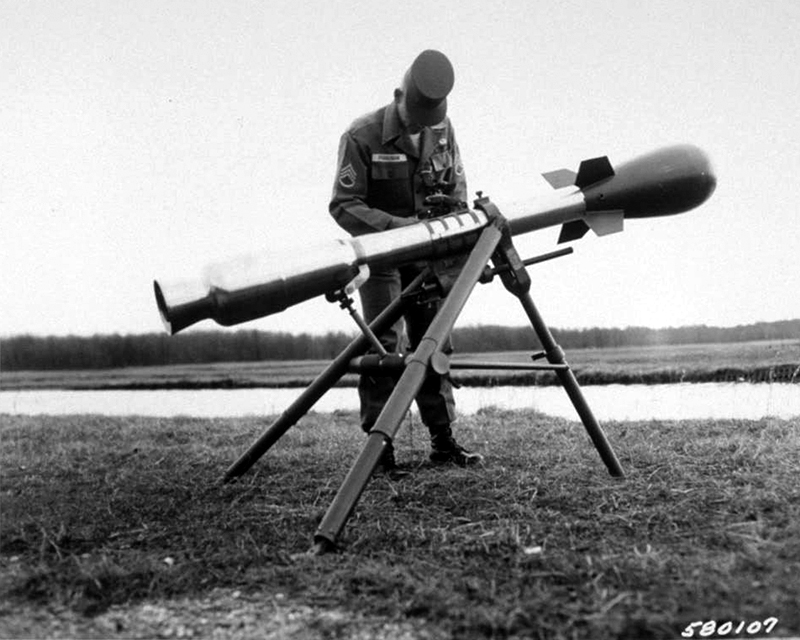
The Davy Crockett artillery shell is the smallest known nuclear weapon developed by the US.

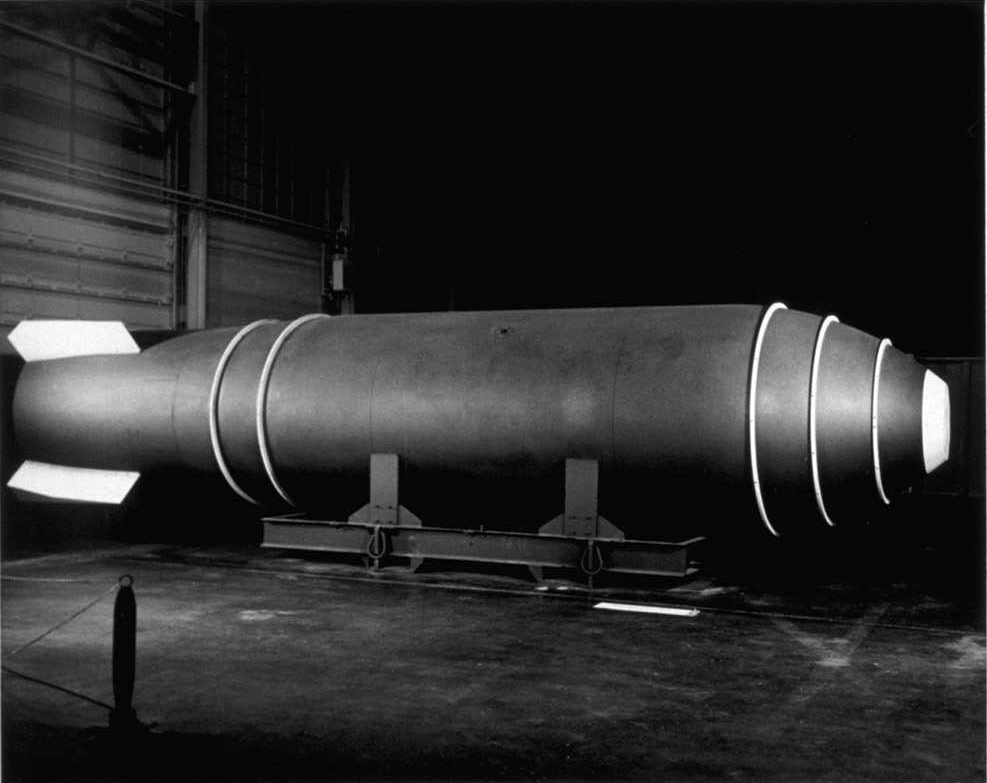
The Mk-17 was an early US thermonuclear weapon and weighed around 21 short tons (19,000 kg).

Other delivery methods included nuclear artillery shells, mines such as the Medium Atomic Demolition Munition and the novel Blue Peacock, nuclear depth bombs, and nuclear torpedoes. An 'Atomic Bazooka' was also fielded, designed to be used against large formations of tanks.

In the 1950s the US developed small nuclear warheads for air defense use, such as the Nike Hercules. From the 1950s to the 1980s, the United States and Canada fielded a low-yield nuclear armed air-to-air rocket, the AIR-2 Genie. Further developments of this concept, some with much larger warheads, led to the early anti-ballistic missiles. The United States has largely taken nuclear air-defense weapons out of service with the fall of the Soviet Union in the early 1990s. Russia updated its nuclear armed Soviet era anti-ballistic missile (ABM) system, known as the A-135 anti-ballistic missile system in 1995. It is believed that the, in development successor to the nuclear A-135, the A-235 Samolet-M, will dispense with nuclear interception warheads and instead rely on a conventional hit-to-kill capability to destroy its target.

Small, two-man portable tactical weapons (erroneously referred to as suitcase bombs), such as the Special Atomic Demolition Munition, have been developed, although the difficulty to combine sufficient yield with portability limits their military utility.

== Costs ==
According to an audit by the Brookings Institution, between 1940 and 1996, the US spent $11.9 trillion in present-day terms on nuclear weapons programs. 57 percent of which was spent on building delivery mechanisms for nuclear weapons. 6.3 percent of the total, $749 billion in present-day terms, was spent on weapon nuclear waste management, for example, cleaning up the Hanford site with environmental remediation, and 7 percent of the total, $840 billion was spent on the manufacturing of nuclear weapons themselves.

=== Technology spin-offs ===
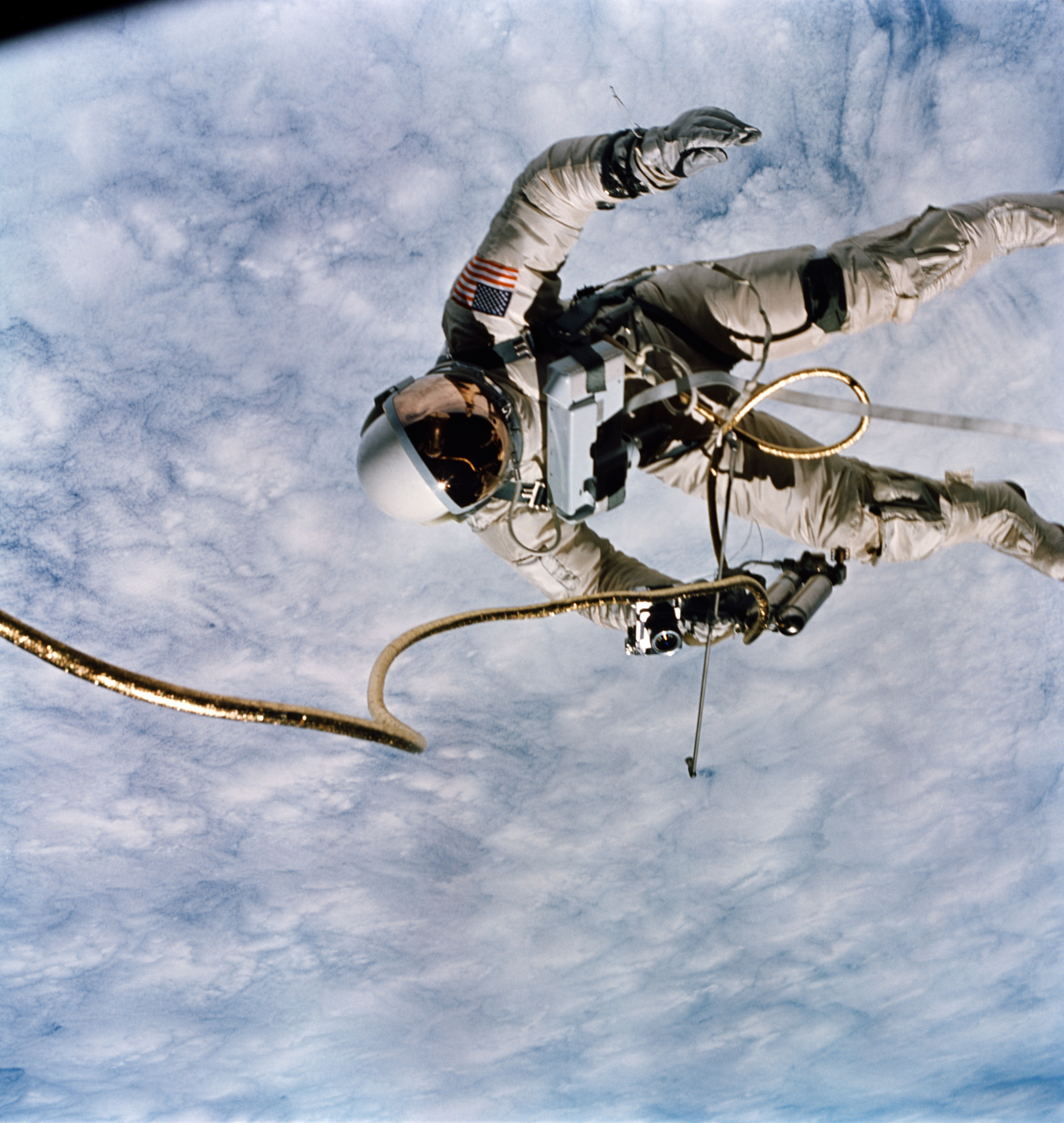
Edward White during the first US "Spacewalk" Extravehicular activity (EVA), Project Gemini 4, June 1965

Strictly speaking however not all this 57 percent was spent solely on "weapons programs" delivery systems.

==== Launch vehicles ====
For example, two such delivery mechanisms, the Atlas ICBM and Titan II, were re-purposed as human launch vehicles for human spaceflight, both were used in the civilian Project Mercury and Project Gemini programs respectively, which are regarded as stepping stones in the evolution of US human spaceflight. The Atlas vehicle sent John Glenn, the first American into orbit. Similarly in the Soviet Union it was the R-7 ICBM/launch vehicle that placed the first artificial satellite in space, Sputnik, on 4 October 1957, and the first human spaceflight in history was accomplished on a derivative of the R-7, the Vostok, on April 12, 1961, by cosmonaut Yuri Gagarin. A modernized version of the R-7 is still in use as the launch vehicle for the Russian Federation, in the form of the Soyuz spacecraft. The Proton rocket family was originally developed as a "super-heavy ICBM" to launch heavy warheads with a 100 megaton yield of the same design used in the 1961 Tsar Bomba test.

==== Weather satellites ====
The first true weather satellite, the TIROS-1 was launched on the Thor-Able launch vehicle in April 1960. The PGM-17 Thor was the first operational IRBM (intermediate ballistic missile) deployed by the US Air Force (USAF). The Soviet Union's first fully operational weather satellite, the Meteor 1 was launched on 26 March 1969, on the Vostok rocket, a derivative of the R-7 ICBM.

==== Lubricants ====
WD-40 was first used by Convair to protect the outer skin, and more importantly, the paper thin "balloon tanks" of the Atlas missile from rust and corrosion. These stainless steel fuel tanks were so thin that, when empty, they had to be kept inflated with nitrogen gas to prevent their collapse.

==== Thermal isolation ====
In 1953, Dr. S. Donald Stookey of the Corning Research and Development Division invented Pyroceram, a white glass-ceramic material capable of withstanding a thermal shock (sudden temperature change) of up to 450 °C (840 °F). It evolved from materials originally developed for a US ballistic missile program, and Stookey's research involved heat-resistant material for nose cones.

==== Satellite assisted positioning ====
Precise navigation would enable United States submarines to get an accurate fix of their positions before they launched their SLBMs, this spurred development of triangulation methods that ultimately culminated in GPS. The motivation for having accurate launch position fixes, and missile velocities, is twofold. It results in a tighter target impact circular error probable and therefore by extension, reduces the need for the earlier generation of heavy multi-megaton nuclear warheads, such as the W53 to ensure the target is destroyed. With increased target accuracy, a greater number of lighter, multi-kiloton range warheads can be packed on a given missile, giving a higher number of separate targets that can be hit per missile.

==== Global positioning system ====
During a Labor Day weekend in 1973, a meeting of about twelve military officers at the Pentagon discussed the creation of a Defense Navigation Satellite System (DNSS). It was at this meeting that "the real synthesis that became GPS was created." Later that year, the DNSS program was named Navstar, or Navigation System Using Timing and Ranging.

During the development of the submarine-launched Polaris missile, a requirement to accurately know the submarine's location was needed to ensure a high circular error probable warhead target accuracy. This led the US to develop the Transit system. In 1959, ARPA (renamed DARPA in 1972) also played a role in Transit.

A visual example of a 24 satellite GPS constellation in motion with the Earth rotating. Notice how the number of satellites in view from a given point on the Earth's surface, in this example at 45°N, changes with time. GPS was initially developed to increase Ballistic Missile Circular Error Probable accuracy, accuracy which is vital in a counterforce attack.

The first satellite navigation system, Transit, used by the United States Navy, was first successfully tested in 1960. It used a constellation of five satellites and could provide a navigational fix approximately once per hour. In 1967, the US Navy developed the Timation satellite that proved the ability to place accurate clocks in space, a technology required by the latter Global Positioning System. In the 1970s, the ground-based Omega Navigation System, based on phase comparison of signal transmission from pairs of stations, became the first worldwide radio navigation system. Limitations of these systems drove the need for a more universal navigation solution with greater accuracy.

While there were wide needs for accurate navigation in military and civilian sectors, almost none of those was seen as justification for the billions of dollars it would cost in research, development, deployment, and operation for a constellation of navigation satellites. During the Cold War arms race, the nuclear threat to the existence of the United States was the one need that did justify this cost in the view of the United States Congress. This deterrent effect is why GPS was funded. The nuclear triad consisted of the United States Navy's submarine-launched ballistic missiles (SLBMs) along with United States Air Force (USAF) strategic bombers and intercontinental ballistic missiles (ICBMs). Considered vital to the nuclear-deterrence posture, accurate determination of the SLBM launch position was a force multiplier.

Precise navigation would enable United States submarines to get an accurate fix of their positions before they launched their SLBMs. The USAF, with two-thirds of the nuclear triad, also had requirements for a more accurate and reliable navigation system. The Navy and Air Force were developing their own technologies in parallel to solve what was essentially the same problem. To increase the survivability of ICBMs, there was a proposal to use mobile launch platforms (such as Russian SS-24 and SS-25) and so the need to fix the launch position had similarity to the SLBM situation.

In 1960, the Air Force proposed a radio-navigation system called MOSAIC (MObile System for Accurate ICBM Control) that was essentially a 3-D LORAN. A follow-on study, Project 57, was worked in 1963 and it was "in this study that the GPS concept was born". That same year, the concept was pursued as Project 621B, which had "many of the attributes that you now see in GPS" and promised increased accuracy for Air Force bombers as well as ICBMs. Updates from the Navy Transit system were too slow for the high speeds of Air Force operation. The Navy Research Laboratory continued advancements with their Timation (Time Navigation) satellites, first launched in 1967, and with the third one in 1974 carrying the first atomic clock into orbit.

Another important predecessor to GPS came from a different branch of the United States military. In 1964, the United States Army orbited its first Sequential Collation of Range (SECOR) satellite used for geodetic surveying. The SECOR system included three ground-based transmitters from known locations that would send signals to the satellite transponder in orbit. A fourth ground-based station, at an undetermined position, could then use those signals to fix its location precisely. The last SECOR satellite was launched in 1969. Decades later, during the early years of GPS, civilian surveying became one of the first fields to make use of the new technology, because surveyors could reap benefits of signals from the less-than-complete GPS constellation years before it was declared operational. GPS can be thought of as an evolution of the SECOR system where the ground-based transmitters have been migrated into orbit.

== See also ==
- History of nuclear weapons
- List of nuclear weapons
- Mutual assured destruction doctrine
- National missile defense of the United States
- Nuclear explosion
- Nuclear strategy
- Nuclear weapon design
- Nuclear terrorism
