= Nuclear utilization target selection =

Hypothesis regarding the use of nuclear weapons

Nuclear utilization target selection (NUTS) is a hypothesis regarding the use of nuclear weapons often contrasted with mutually assured destruction (MAD). NUTS theory at its most basic level asserts that it is possible for a limited nuclear exchange to occur and that nuclear weapons are simply one more rung on the ladder of escalation pioneered by Herman Kahn. This leads to a number of other conclusions regarding the potential uses of and responses to nuclear weapons.

== Counterforce strikes ==
A counterforce strike consists of an attack on enemy nuclear weapons meant to destroy them before they can be used. A viable first strike capability would require the ability to launch a 100-percent-effective (or nearly so) counterforce attack. Such an attack is made more difficult by systems such as early warning radars which allow the possibility for rapid recognition and response to a nuclear attack and by systems such as submarine-launched ballistic missiles or road-mobile nuclear missiles (such as the Soviet SS-20) which make nuclear weapons harder to locate and target.

Since a limited nuclear war is a viable option for a NUTS theorist, the power to unleash such attacks holds a great deal of appeal. However, establishing such a capability is very expensive. A counterforce weapon requires a much more accurate warhead than a countervalue weapon, as it must be guaranteed to detonate very close to its target, which drastically increases relative costs.

== Limited countervalue strikes ==
Some NUTS theorists hold that a mutually assured destruction-type deterrent is not credible in cases of a small attack, such as one carried out on a single city, as it is suicidal. In such a case, an overwhelming nuclear response would destroy every enemy city and thus every potential hostage that could be used to influence the attacker's behavior. This would free up the attacker to launch further attacks and remove any chance for the attacked nation to bargain. A country adhering to a NUTS-style war plan would likely respond to such an attack with a limited attack on one or several enemy cities.

== Missile defense ==
Since NUTS theory assumes the possibility of a winnable nuclear war, the contention of many MAD theorists that missile defense systems should be abandoned as a destabilizing influence is generally not accepted by NUTS theorists. For NUTS theorists, a missile defence system would be a positive force in that it would protect against a limited nuclear attack. Additionally, such a system would increase the odds of success for a counterforce attack by assuring that if some targets escaped the initial attack, the incoming missiles could be intercepted. But protection against a limited attack means that the opponent has incentive to launch a larger scale attack, against which the defence is likely to be ineffective. Additionally, increased possibility of success of counterforce attacks means that the opponent has the incentive to launch a preventive attack, which increases the risk of a large scale response to misinterpreted signals.

== NUTS and US nuclear strategy ==
NUTS theory can be seen in the US adoption of a number of first-strike weapons, such as the Trident II and Minuteman III nuclear missiles, which both have an extremely low circular error probable (CEP) of about 90 meters for the former and 120 meters for the latter. These weapons are accurate enough to almost certainly destroy a missile silo if it is targeted.

Additionally, the US has proceeded with a number of programs which improve its strategic situation in a nuclear confrontation. The Stealth bomber has the capacity to carry a large number of stealthy cruise missiles, which could be nuclear-tipped, and due to its low probability of detection and long range would be an excellent weapon with which to deliver a first strike.

During the late 1970s and the 1980s, the Pentagon began to adopt strategies for limited nuclear options to make it possible to control escalation and reduce the risk of all-out nuclear war, hence accepting NUTS. In 1980, President Jimmy Carter signed Presidential Directive 59 which endorsed the NUTS strategic posture committed to fight and win a nuclear war, and accepted escalation dominance and flexible response. The Soviets, however, were skeptical of limited options or the possibility of controlling escalation. While Soviet deterrence doctrine posited massive responses to any nuclear use ("all against any"), military officials considered the possibility of proportionate responses to a limited US attack, although they "doubted that nuclear war could remain limited for long."

Like several other nuclear powers, but unlike China and India, the United States has never made a "no first use" pledge, maintaining that pledging not to use nuclear weapons before an opponent would undermine their deterrent. NATO plans for war with the USSR called for the use of tactical nuclear weapons in order to counter Soviet numerical superiority.

Rather than making extensive preparations for battlefield nuclear combat in Central Europe, the Soviet General Staff emphasized conventional military operations and believing that they had an advantage there. "The Soviet military leadership believed that conventional superiority provided the Warsaw Pact with the means to approximate the effects of nuclear weapons and achieve victory in Europe without resort to those weapons."

In criticising US policy on nuclear weapons as contradictory, leftist philosopher Slavoj Zizek has suggested that NUTS is the policy of the US with respect to Iran and North Korea while its policy with respect to Russia and China is one of mutual assured destruction (MAD).

== See also ==
- CARVER matrix – Target acquisition system
- Nuclear strategy – Doctrines and plans for production and use of atomic weapons
- Nuclear warfare – Military conflict that deploys nuclear weaponry
- Ryszard Kukliński – Polish colonel and spy (1930–2004)
- Single Integrated Operational Plan (SIOP) – 1961–2003 US nuclear strategy document
