= Northwood Declaration =

2025 nuclear weapons treaty

The Northwood Declaration is a bilateral agreement signed between the United Kingdom and France to coordinate their nuclear deterrence strategies. This declaration was signed on the 10th of July 2025 at the end of a three-day bilateral summit. The declaration was signed by the prime minister of the United Kingdom Keir Starmer and the president of France Emmanuel Macron, at the British military base of Northwood Headquarters.

== See also ==
- Defence cooperation between France and the United Kingdom
