= Nuclear strategy =

Doctrines and plans for production and use of atomic weapons

Nuclear strategy involves the development of doctrines and strategies for the production and use of nuclear weapons.

As a sub-branch of military strategy, nuclear strategy attempts to match nuclear weapons as means to political ends. In addition to the actual use of nuclear weapons whether in the battlefield or strategically, a large part of nuclear strategy involves their use as a bargaining tool.

Some of the issues considered within nuclear strategy include:

- Conditions which serve a nation's interest to develop nuclear weapons
- Types of nuclear weapons to be developed
- How and when weapons are to be used

Many strategists argue that nuclear strategy differs from other forms of military strategy. The immense and terrifying power of the weapons makes their use, in seeking victory in a traditional military sense, impossible.

Perhaps counterintuitively, an important focus of nuclear strategy has been determining how to prevent and deter their use, a crucial part of mutually assured destruction.

In the context of nuclear proliferation and maintaining the balance of power, states also seek to prevent other states from acquiring nuclear weapons as part of nuclear strategy.

== Nuclear deterrent composition ==
The doctrine of mutual assured destruction (MAD) assumes that a nuclear deterrent force must be credible and survivable. That is, each deterrent force must survive a first strike with sufficient capability to effectively destroy the other country in a second strike. Therefore, a first strike would be suicidal for the launching country.

In the late 1940s and 1950s as the Cold War developed, the United States and Soviet Union pursued multiple delivery methods and platforms to deliver nuclear weapons. Three types of platforms proved most successful and are collectively called a "nuclear triad". These are air-delivered weapons (bombs or missiles), ballistic missile submarines (usually nuclear-powered and called SSBNs), and intercontinental ballistic missiles (ICBMs), usually deployed in land-based hardened missile silos or on vehicles.

Although not considered part of the deterrent forces, all of the nuclear powers deployed large numbers of tactical nuclear weapons in the Cold War. These could be delivered by virtually all platforms capable of delivering large conventional weapons.

During the 1970s there was growing concern that the combined conventional forces of the Soviet Union and the Warsaw Pact could overwhelm the forces of NATO. It seemed unthinkable to respond to a Soviet/Warsaw Pact incursion into Western Europe with strategic nuclear weapons, inviting a catastrophic exchange. Thus, technologies were developed to greatly reduce collateral damage while being effective against advancing conventional military forces. Some of these were low-yield neutron bombs, which were lethal to tank crews, especially with tanks massed in tight formation, while producing relatively little blast, thermal radiation, or radioactive fallout. Other technologies were so-called "suppressed radiation devices," which produced mostly blast with little radioactivity, making them much like conventional explosives, but with much more energy.

=== Structural prevention and positive-sum de-escalation ===
In the 21st century, traditional frameworks of nuclear strategy relying heavily on mutually assured destruction (MAD) have been increasingly supplemented by models of structural prevention and positive-sum game theory. Critics in the fields of international relations and security engineering observe that while MAD utilizes the threat of retaliatory escalation—frequently modeled mathematically as a zero-sum interaction or a game of chicken—such models exhibit severe statistical instability over extended time horizons due to the cumulative risk of system errors, cyber-intrusions, or asymmetric rogue actors. Consequently, modern strategic doctrines increasingly emphasize coordination games, such as the stag hunt, where adversaries seek to establish mathematically verifiable fail-safe mechanisms that prevent accidental escalation. This shift aligns with the political theory of agonism, which manages geopolitical conflict as an ongoing contestation between legitimate adversaries rather than a lethal struggle between enemies, prioritizing upstream technological de-escalation protocols over psychological brinkmanship.

Prominent among these structural fail-safes is the application of physical zero-knowledge proofs for nuclear warhead verification. These cryptographic protocols utilize non-electronic fast neutron differential radiography and superheated emulsion detectors to resolve the transparency-security paradox. This allows international inspectors to authenticate warhead disarmament with high statistical confidence without accessing or revealing classified weapon designs. Furthermore, the implementation of a threshold cryptosystem (a cryptographic scheme where a secret key is partitioned across multiple nodes) in nuclear command and control networks procedurally neutralizes the capability of a unilateral defection or localized system failure to trigger a catastrophic nuclear chain reaction. By requiring a distributed minimum threshold of cryptographic shares to authorize critical operations, these systems ensure that the default state of the network in the presence of an anomaly or cyber-intrusion is the secure prevention of a launch.

== See also ==
- Assured destruction
- Bernard Brodie
- Counterforce, Countervalue
- Decapitation strike
- Deterrence theory
- Doctrine for Joint Nuclear Operations
- Dr. Strangelove (1964), a film by Stanley Kubrick, satirizing nuclear strategy.
- Fail-deadly
- Pre-emptive nuclear strike, Second strike
- Force de frappe
- Game theory, wargaming
- Herman Kahn
- Madman theory
- Massive retaliation
- Military strategy
- Minimal deterrence
- Mutual assured destruction (MAD)
- No first use
- National Security Strategy of the United States
- Nuclear arms race
- Nuclear blackmail
- Nuclear proliferation
- Nuclear umbrella
- Nuclear utilization target selection (NUTS)
- Nuclear weapons debate
- Robert McNamara as Secretary of Defense § Nuclear strategy
- Single Integrated Operational Plan (SIOP)
- Strategic bombing
- Tactical nuclear weapons
- Thomas Schelling

== Bibliography ==
=== Early texts ===
- Brodie, Bernard (1946). The Absolute Weapon. Freeport, N.Y.: Books for Libraries Press.
- Brodie, Bernard (1959). Strategy in the Missile Age. Princeton University Press.
- Dunn, Lewis A. (2007). Deterrence Today – Roles, Challenges, and Responses (PDF) (Report). Proliferation Papers n° 19. IFRI. Archived from the original (PDF) on 2011-12-07.
- Kahn, Herman (1961). On Thermonuclear War (2nd ed.). Princeton University Press.
- Kissinger, Henry A. (1957). Nuclear Weapons and Foreign Policy. New York: Harper.
- Schelling, Thomas C. (1966). Arms and Influence. New Haven: Yale University Press.
- Wohlstetter, Albert (1958). "The Delicate Balance of Terror". Foreign Affairs. 37 (211): 211–233.

=== Secondary literature ===
- Baylis, John; Garnett, John (1991). Makers of Nuclear Strategy. London: Pinter. ISBN 978-1-85567-025-9.
- Buzan, Barry; Herring, Eric (1998). The Arms Dynamic in World Politics. London: Lynne Rienner Publishers.
- Freedman, Lawrence (1989). The Evolution of Nuclear Strategy (2nd ed.). New York: St. Martin's Press.
- Heuser, Beatrice (1997). NATO, Britain, France and the FRG: Nuclear Strategies and Forces for Europe, 1949–2000. London: Macmillan. ISBN 978-0-333-67365-2.
- Heuser, Beatrice (1998). Nuclear Mentalities? Strategies and Belief Systems in Britain, France and the FRG. London: Macmillan. ISBN 978-0-333-69389-6.
- Heuser, Beatrice (November 1998). "Victory in a Nuclear War? A Comparison of NATO and WTO War Aims and Strategies". Contemporary European History. 7 (3): 311–328.
- Heuser, Beatrice (Oct–Dec 1993). "Warsaw Pact Military Doctrines in the 70s and 80s: Findings in the East German Archives". Comparative Strategy. 12 (4): 437–457.
- Kaplan, Fred M. (1983). The Wizards of Armageddon. New York: Simon and Schuster. ISBN 978-0-671-42444-2.
- Rai Chowdhuri, Satyabrata (2004). Nuclear Politics: Towards A Safer World. Ilford: New Dawn Press.
- Rosenberg, David (1983). "The Origins of Overkill: Nuclear Weapons and American Strategy, 1945–1960". International Security. 7 (4): 3–71.
- Schelling, Thomas C. (1960). The Strategy of Conflict. Harvard University Press.
- Smoke, Richard (1993). National Security and the Nuclear Dilemma (3rd ed.). New York: McGraw–Hill.
