= No first use =

Policy on use of nuclear weapons

A no first use (NFU) policy is a commitment by a nuclear power not to initiate the use of nuclear weapons. Such a pledge would allow for a unique state of affairs in which a given nuclear power can be engaged in a conflict of conventional weaponry while it formally forswears any of the strategic advantages of nuclear weapons, provided the enemy power does not possess or utilize any such weapons of their own. The concept is primarily invoked in reference to nuclear mutually assured destruction but has also been applied to chemical and biological warfare, as is the case of the official WMD policy of India.

China and India are currently the only two nuclear powers to formally maintain a NFU policy, adopting pledges in 1964 and 1998 respectively. Both NATO and a number of its member states have repeatedly rejected calls for adopting a NFU policy, as during the lifetime of the Soviet Union a pre-emptive nuclear strike was commonly argued as a key option to afford NATO a credible nuclear deterrent, compensating for the overwhelming conventional weapon superiority enjoyed by the Soviet Army in Eurasia. In 1993, Russia dropped a pledge against first use of nuclear weapons made in 1982 by Leonid Brezhnev, with Russian military doctrine later stating in 2000 that Russia reserves the right to use nuclear weapons "in response to a large-scale conventional aggression". Pakistan has also made similar statements, largely in reference to intermittent military tensions with India. North Korea has publicly pledged to refrain from a preemptive nuclear strike, while threatening retaliation up to and including WMD against conventional aggression. Israel has not declared a NFU policy and it maintains the stance of nuclear ambiguity, but has said it would not be the first country to "introduce" nuclear weapons into the Middle East.

== Countries pledging no-first-use ==
=== China ===
China's stated policy has been one of no first use while maintaining a secure second-strike capability. Its policy was historically also one of minimal deterrence in which its nuclear arsenal was focused on civilian and industrial countervalue and non-nuclear military targets (as opposed to nuclear-capable counterforce targets). In 1957, Zhou Enlai stated, "We are developing nuclear weapons mainly to resolve the issues of deterrence. The scale does not need to be large. We are forced to build missiles and nuclear weapons, not for a race with the nuclear powers, but for breaking their nuclear monopoly and preventing their use of nuclear weapons." Following its first test in 1964, China stated that:

The Chinese Government has consistently advocated the complete and thorough destruction of nuclear weapons. Had this been realized, China would not have needed to develop the nuclear weapons. The Chinese Government hereby solemnly declares that China will never at any time and under any circumstances be the first to use nuclear weapons.

Mao Zedong and Zhou Enlai generally considered nuclear weapons as strategic and political tools rather than tactical weapons. Mao also signaled that China's interest in nuclear weapons was to achieve minimal deterrence. As director of the NDSTC, which oversaw coordination of departments with authority in nuclear weapons issues, Nie Rongzhen made China's minimal deterrence doctrine explicit, stating, "To free ourselves of the frequent bullying and oppression of the imperialists for over one century, we must develop advanced weapons, missiles and atomic bombs, so that we have the minimum means of reprisal when we are attacked by the imperialists' nuclear weapons." China also implemented centralized command and control arrangements for nuclear weapons so that they could not be used without orders from top leadership. The 1975 General Combat Regulations for a Combined Army stated, "at any time, under any circumstances, we will absolutely not use nuclear weapons first, only when the enemy uses them first, will we, according to the order of the supreme command, then use this kind of weapon to resolutely counterattack." China renewed its no-first-use policy in its official 2019 and 2023 national defense policy white papers.

In its 1964 statement, China called for international treaties prohibiting first use and nuclear use and threats against non-nuclear countries. In 1994, China submitted a "Draft Treaty on No-First Use of Nuclear Weapons" to the other four NPT nuclear-weapon states. In 2024, China submitted to the NPT review conference a "No-first-use of Nuclear Weapons Initiative", repeating calls for an NFU treaty between the P5 states and a separate treaty which prohibits nuclear use and threats against non-nuclear-weapon states and nuclear-weapon-free zones. Other nuclear weapon states have never taken China's NFU treaty proposal seriously and some analysts have stated that China periodically advances its proposal to distract from major developments and build-up of its own nuclear arsenal.

From 1986 to 1993, debates among the political leadership in China addressed the role of China's nuclear forces in potential local wars. Chinese leadership doubted that a first-use posture was credible. Leadership debates continued until 2005 on whether first use was feasible under certain circumstances. After these debates, China decided to remain in a no first use posture. Jiang Zemin reaffirmed the country's retaliatory nuclear posture, saying "We develop strategic nuclear weapons, not in order to attack, but in order to defend. If people don't attack us, we won't attack them, but if people attack us, we must attack them." In 1996, during the Third Taiwan Strait Crisis, PLA general Xiong Guangkai made what some in United States Indo-Pacific Command considered an implied nuclear threat against Los Angeles.

From 2000 to 2006, in the wake of the 1999 United States bombing of the Chinese embassy in Belgrade, PLA strategists and civilian strategists debated whether China should add conditions to its no first use policy, but rejected the idea. China has not publicly clarified whether U.S. allies covered by U.S. nuclear guarantees are exempt from Chinese nuclear use. Some Chinese proponents of conditioning the no-first use policy pointed to the Bush administration's Nuclear Posture Review, which discussed US nuclear weapons in the context of a "Taiwan contingency". Proponents of adding conditions contended that doing so would make China's nuclear deterrence more effective if a "Taiwan contingency" occurred. In 2005, Zhu Chenghu, a PLA major general and dean of the PLA's National Defense University, suggested China could initiate a nuclear first strike on American cities in the continental United States if it intervened in a conflict over Taiwan with conventional forces.

Observers have often doubted the credibility of China's no first use policy. Some have postulated that China may not honor the policy in certain situations such as the sinking of one of its ballistic missile submarines or in a conventional conflict over Taiwan. The 2023 U.S. Congressional Strategic Posture Commission assessed that China would likely use nuclear weapons if non-nuclear attacks threaten its nuclear forces or command system. Such a risk would be heightened in a conflict because China's conventional and nuclear delivery systems are often intermingled, according to academic Caitlin Talmadge. In 2024, the United States Department of State described China's no-first-use policy as "already ambiguous" prior to its recent nuclear arsenal build-up.

Academic Hui Zhang wrote in 2025 that so far there was little evidence to suggest China had changed its nuclear strategy and doctrine, but it has deviated from a minimal deterrence policy. Other observers have also stated that China no longer applies a policy of minimal deterrence.

=== India ===
India first adopted the NFU policy after its second series of nuclear tests, Pokhran-II, in 1998. In August 1999, the Indian government released a draft of the doctrine which asserts that nuclear weapons are solely for deterrence and that India will pursue a policy of "retaliation only". The document also maintains that India "will not be the first to initiate a nuclear first strike, but will respond with punitive retaliation should deterrence fail" and that decisions to authorise the use of nuclear weapons would be made by the prime minister or his "designated successor(s)". India is in the process of developing a nuclear doctrine based on "credible minimum deterrence".

In a speech at the National Defence College by India's National Security Advisor, Shivshankar Menon, on October 21, 2010, the wording was changed from "no first use" to "no first use against non-nuclear weapon states", but some argued that it was not a substantive change but "an innocent typographical or lexical error in the text of the speech". In April 2013, Shyam Saran, convener of the National Security Advisory Board, affirmed that regardless of the size of a nuclear attack against India, be it a tactical nuclear weapon or a strategic nuclear weapon, India would retaliate massively. That was in response to reports that Pakistan had developed a tactical battlefield nuclear weapon in an attempt to supposedly nullify an Indian "no first use" retaliatory doctrine. In 2014, Prime Minister Narendra Modi described India's NFU policy as part of the country's "cultural heritage", reaffirming India's commitment to NFU policy despite the escalation of tensions between India and Pakistan in 2001–2002. On November 10, 2016, the Indian Defence Minister Manohar Parrikar questioned the NFU policy of India, and asked why should India "bind" itself when it is a "responsible nuclear power". He clarified that it was his personal opinion.

Vajpayee's government conducted the Pokhran-II nuclear tests in 1998. On September 26, 2013, Indian Minister of External Affairs Salman Khurshid, reiterated India's NFU policy at the High Level Meeting of the General Assembly on Nuclear Disarmament, New York. Indian defence minister Rajnath Singh, speaking on the anniversary of the death of former prime minister Atal Bihari Vajpayee on August 16, 2019, said that India's NFU policy might change depending upon the "circumstances". Most recently, on September 26, 2025, Sibi George, secretary (West) at the Ministry of External Affairs of India, reconfirmed their NFU policy at the High-Level Meeting on Elimination of Nuclear Weapons, AM & PM Meetings.

== Countries without a no-first-use policy ==
Pakistan, Russia, the United Kingdom, the United States, France, and North Korea say that they will use nuclear weapons against either nuclear or non-nuclear states only in the case of invasion or other attack against their territory or against one of their allies. Historically, NATO military strategy, taking into account the numerical superiority of Warsaw Pact conventional forces, assumed that tactical nuclear weapons would have to be used to defeat a Soviet invasion.

At the 16th NATO summit in April 1999, Germany proposed that NATO adopt a no-first-use policy, but the proposal was rejected. In 2022, the leaders of the five NPT nuclear-weapon states issued a statement on prevention of nuclear war, saying "We affirm that a nuclear war cannot be won and must never be fought."

=== Soviet Union/Russia ===
In its final years, the Soviet Union adopted a formal no-first-use policy in 1982 when Foreign Minister Andrei Gromyko read out at the United Nations a pledge by General Secretary Leonid Brezhnev not to launch a pre-emptive nuclear strike. On April 26, 1983, American child actress Samantha Smith received a mail directly from new leader Andropov, also emphasis that "Soviet Union solemnly declared throughout the entire world that never—never—will it use nuclear weapons first against any country". However, this pledge was not taken very seriously, and later leaked Soviet Armed Forces documents confirmed that the military had made plans for a pre-emptive nuclear strike and considered launching one during the Able Archer 83 crisis. After the dissolution of the Soviet Union, the Russian Federation formally reversed this policy in 1993 due to the weakness of the Russian Armed Forces in the post-Soviet era. Russia describes its entire military doctrine as defensive military doctrine.

With regard to nuclear weapons specifically, Russia reserves the right to use nuclear weapons:

- in response to the use of nuclear and other types of weapons of mass destruction against it or its allies, and also
- in case of aggression against Russia with the use of conventional weapons when the very existence of the state is threatened.

The military doctrine of 2014 did not depart from this stance. The 2020 Presidential Executive Order on Nuclear Deterrence in Article 4 uses the following wording: "deterrence of a potential adversary from aggression against the Russian Federation and/or its allies. In the event of a military conflict, this Policy provides for the prevention of an escalation of military actions and their termination on conditions that are acceptable for the Russian Federation and/or its allies." This has been interpreted as describing non-nuclear scenarios where Russia might use nuclear weapons to achieve its military goals. During the 2022 Russian invasion of Ukraine, observers expressed concern that Russia would preemptively use tactical nuclear weapons after President Vladimir Putin announced the mobilization of Russian nuclear forces to "combat-ready" status. In December 2022, Putin claimed that Russia would not be the first to use nuclear weapons or the second, and that "Russian nuclear doctrine is premised on self-defense."

Russia and China maintain a mutual agreement to have a NFU policy which was developed under the Treaty of Good-Neighborliness and Friendly Cooperation in 2001. Under the second paragraph of article two, China and Russia agreed that "The contracting parties reaffirm their commitment that they will not be the first to use nuclear weapons against each other nor target strategic nuclear missiles against each other."

=== United Kingdom ===
In March 2002, the Secretary of State for Defence Geoff Hoon stated that the UK was prepared to use nuclear weapons against "rogue states" such as Ba'athist Iraq if they ever used "weapons of mass destruction" against British Armed Forces troops in the field. This policy was restated in February 2003 and again under the Ministry of Defence's Strategic Defence and Security Review 2010. In April 2017 Defence Secretary Michael Fallon confirmed that the UK would use nuclear weapons in a "pre-emptive initial strike" in "the most extreme circumstances". Fallon stated in a parliamentary answer that the UK has neither a 'first use' or 'no first use' in its nuclear weapon policy so that its adversaries would not know when the UK would launch nuclear strikes.

=== United States ===
The United States has refused to adopt a NFU policy and says that it "reserves the right to use" nuclear weapons first in the case of conflict. This was partially to provide a nuclear umbrella over its allies in NATO as a deterrent against a conventional Warsaw Pact attack during the Cold War, and NATO continues to oppose a no-first-use policy. Not only did the United States and NATO refuse to adopt a NFU policy, but until 1967 they maintained a nuclear doctrine of "massive retaliation" in which nuclear weapons would explicitly be used to defend North America or Western Europe against a conventional attack. Although this strategy was revised, they both reserved the right to use nuclear weapons first under the new doctrine of "flexible response".

Released on April 6, 2010, the 2010 Nuclear Posture Review reduces the role of U.S. nuclear weapons: "The fundamental role of U.S. nuclear weapons, which will continue as long as nuclear weapons exist, is to deter nuclear attack on the United States, our allies, and partners." The U.S. doctrine also includes the following assurance to other states: "The United States will not use or threaten to use nuclear weapons against non-nuclear weapons states that are party to the NPT and in compliance with their nuclear non-proliferation obligations."

For states eligible for the assurance, the United States would not use nuclear weapons in response to a chemical or biological attack but states that those responsible for such an attack would be held accountable and would face the prospect of a devastating conventional military response. Even for states that are not eligible for the assurance, the United States would consider the use of nuclear weapons only in extreme circumstances to defend the vital interests of the United States or its allies and partners. The Nuclear Posture Review also notes, "It is in the U.S. interest and that of all other nations that the nearly 65-year record of nuclear non-use be extended forever."

This supersedes the doctrine of the George W. Bush administration set forth in "Doctrine for Joint Nuclear Operations" and written under the direction of Air Force General Richard Myers, chairman of the Joint Chiefs of Staff. That now superseded doctrine envisioned commanders requesting presidential approval to use nuclear weapons to preempt an attack by a nation or a terrorist group using weapons of mass destruction. The now superseded doctrine also included the option of using nuclear weapons to destroy known enemy stockpiles of nuclear, biological, or chemical weapons.

In August 2016, President Barack Obama reportedly considered adopting a NFU policy. Obama was persuaded by several Cabinet officials such as Secretary of State John Kerry, Secretary of Defense Ash Carter, and Secretary of Energy Ernest Moniz that 'no first use' would rattle U.S. allies and decided not to take up the policy.

During the 2017–2018 North Korea crisis, there were efforts to either require congressional approval for a pre-emptive nuclear strike or to ban it altogether and impose an NFU policy. The Senate Foreign Relations Committee chaired by Bob Corker held its first meeting on the President's authority to use nuclear weapons in 41 years. Since 2017, Ted Lieu, Ed Markey, Elizabeth Warren, and Adam Smith all introduced bills to limit the President's ability to order a pre-emptive nuclear strike. Calls to limit the President of the United States' ability to unilaterally launch a pre-emptive nuclear strike increased after the January 6 United States Capitol attack. In 2025, Ted Lieu introduced a bill called Restricting First Use of Nuclear Weapons Act of 2025 (H.R 669). This bill would restrict the president from launching a first-use nuclear strike and prohibit the use of federal funds without approval from Congress. During the 2020 United States presidential election the eventual victor Joe Biden expressed support for a "sole purpose" declaration confirming that the only use of U.S. nuclear weapons would be as a deterrent, although this is distinct from a "no first use" declaration identifying that the United States would not unilaterally use them.

=== Pakistan ===
Pakistan's Foreign Minister Shamshad Ahmad warned that if Pakistan is ever invaded or attacked, it will use "any weapon in its arsenal" to defend itself.

Pakistan refuses to adopt a NFU doctrine and indicates that it would launch nuclear weapons even if the other side did not use such weapons first. Pakistan's asymmetric nuclear posture has significant influence on India's ability to retaliate, as shown in 2001 and 2008 crises, when non-state actors carried out deadly terrorist attacks on India, only to be met with a relatively subdued response from India. A military spokesperson stated that "Pakistan's threat of nuclear first-use deterred India from seriously considering conventional military strikes."

Pakistan's National Security Advisor Sartaj Aziz defended the policy of first use. Aziz stated that Pakistan's first use doctrine is entirely deterrent in nature. He explained that it was effective after the 2001 Indian Parliament attack and argued that if Pakistan had a NFU policy, there would have been a major war between the two countries.

=== North Korea ===
North Korea's stated policy position is that nuclear weapons "will never be abused or used as a means for preemptive strike", but if there is an "attempt to have recourse to military force against us" North Korea may use their "most powerful offensive strength in advance to punish them".

=== Israel ===
Although Israel does not officially confirm or deny having nuclear weapons, the country is widely believed to be in possession of them. Its continued ambiguous stance puts it in a difficult position since to issue a statement pledging 'no first use' would confirm their possession of nuclear weapons.

Israel has said that it "would not be the first country in the Middle East to formally introduce nuclear weapons into the region".

If Israel's very existence is threatened, some speculate that Israel would use a "Samson Option", a "last resort" deterrence strategy of massive retaliation with nuclear weapons, should the State of Israel be substantially damaged and/or near destruction. According to Israeli historian Avner Cohen, Israel's policy on nuclear weapons, which was set down in 1966, revolves around four "red lines" which could lead to an Israeli nuclear response:

- A successful military penetration into populated areas within Israel's borders.
- The destruction of the Israeli Air Force.
- Israeli cities being subjected to massive and devastating aerial bombardment, chemical attacks, or biological attacks.
- The use of nuclear weapons against Israel.

== Rationale ==
Debates in the international community on strategic no-first-use of nuclear weapons include legal, ethical, moral and political arguments from intergovernmental organizations, regional blocs, non-governmental organizations and civil society actors as well as countries. In 2023, former IPPNW program director John Loretz wrote: "With the risk of nuclear war greater than at any time since the Cold War of the 1980s (Bulletin of the Atomic Scientists 2023)—exacerbated even further by the prolonged war in Ukraine—it comes as no surprise that academics, diplomats, and nuclear strategists are focusing anew on risk reduction proposals. One idea that has been in circulation for some time is a global-no-first-use agreement (GNFU), with unilateral or bilateral NFUs as another option."

According to SIPRI's 1984 analysis, first use of nuclear weapons as a right of self-defense in warfare is the "most controversial" under international law—a right, in their view, not unlimited. Highlighted also were the views of "religious, political and military authorities" who questioned a first-use doctrine. SIPRI concluded that a meaningful no-first-use declaration "would have to be accompanied—or preferably preceded—by changes in the deployment of both nuclear and conventional forces".

Sparking debate with their 1982 Foreign Affairs article, former US national security advisor McGeorge Bundy, US diplomat George F. Kennan, former US Secretary of Defense Robert McNamara and US lead negotiator for the Strategic Arms Limitation Talks Gerard C. Smith challenged the US and the Atlantic Alliance "to consider the possibilities, the requirements, the difficulties, and the advantages of a policy of no-first-use" and urged that citizens, too, consider these policy questions. The authors believed that fully exploring NFU as a strategy and policy would reveal greater advantages than costs and "help the peoples and governments of the Alliance to find the political will to move in this direction". They called "both fear and mistrust ... the most immediate enemies", arguing that: "The Soviet government has repeatedly offered to join the West in declaring such a policy, and while such declarations may have only limited reliability, it would be wrong to disregard the real value to both sides of a jointly declared adherence to this policy." They also maintained that an NFU posture and policy "could help to open the path toward serious reduction of nuclear armaments on both sides", cautioning that "[a]s long as the weapons themselves exist, the possibility of use will remain."

In the context of Japan's reliance on US extended deterrence, former Japanese diplomat, director of JIIA's Center for the Promotion of Disarmament and Nonproliferation (2008–2014) and commissioner of the Japanese Atomic Energy Commission (2014–2017) Nobuyasu Abe in 2018 called for re-examining the role of nuclear weapons alongside the non-nuclear military situation in the regional security environment to bridge the "great divide between idealists and realists" on adopting a no-first-use policy. He described the political divide in Japan as the skepticism of the Japanese government, the ruling LDP, and "center/right conservatives" on the one hand, and the support of the ruling coalition's junior partner Komeito, opposition parties, and "left/center anti-nuclear idealists" on the other. In its analysis of South Korea's reliance on US extended deterrence, the Asan Institute for Policy Studies in January 2022 wrote that, were the US to adopt an NFU position, the credibility of its extended deterrence would be diminished. The institute's public attitudes survey findings, published in May 2023, include naming North Korea as the most pressing security concern, followed by China. In its November 2017 policy brief, the European Council on Foreign Relations concluded that North Korea's posture is one of "nuclear pre-emption" and its government "concerned that a first strike could destroy it"; in contrast, China pursues "what Beijing calls 'nuclear counterstrike campaigns'", having declared its NFU doctrine out of the belief "that neither its government nor its nuclear arsenal could be eliminated in a first strike by a hostile power". And in the foreground of strained relations between South Korea and Japan, stemming from Japan's 1910–1945 occupation of Korea, the June 2023 trilateral meeting of the countries' military chiefs signaled closer nuclear strategy consultation at the urging of their US counterpart.

Nonresident Senior Fellows in Brookings's Center for East Asia Policy Studies Richard C. Bush and Jonathan D. Pollack in 2016 noted that "non-nuclear states living in the shadow of nuclear-armed adversaries" are willing to forego developing their own nuclear arms because of US security guarantees, and that adopting an NFU doctrine "would represent a profound shift" in those guarantees. Co-founder Keith B. Payne and Research Scholar Michaela Dodge of the National Institute for Public Policy in 2023 noted that for decades "US allies" have continued to oppose such a shift, citing a reported survey by the Biden Administration as the most recent indicator, and called for, among other things, "a more informed public discourse" by strengthening and expanding participation in strategic deterrence dialogues. The authors also noted that further enlargement of "underlying 'anti-nuclear' sentiment among some allied governments and/or their publics ... would essentially eliminate the existing US extended nuclear deterrence policy, particularly (but not only) undercutting NATO allied participation in NATO's nuclear deterrence policy." Former chair of the Bundestag Subcommittee on Disarmament and Arms Control Uta Zapf in 2021 characterized NFU policy adoption as "a first step and a door-opener for an urgently needed dialog on the role of NW in military doctrines and strategies". Dominic Tierney, political science professor at Swarthmore College and author of The Right Way to Lose a War: America in an Age of Unwinnable Conflicts, in 2016 wrote: "Champions and critics of no-first-use often cast it as a principled policy and a revolutionary step, for good or for ill. But the idealistic symbolism of no-first-use betrays an underlying reality. Disavowing a first strike is a luxury afforded to the strong. ... No-first-use is the policy of Goliath, not Gandhi."

From the perspective of TPNW supporters, ambassador and director for Disarmament, Arms Control and Non-Proliferation at the Austrian Foreign Ministry Alexander Kmentt in 2020 explained that nuclear risk reduction measures, including de-alerting and de-targeting as well as no-first-use declarations, are "assessed as having a negative impact on the credibility of nuclear deterrence" and "considered only insofar, as they do not impact the nuclear deterrence calculus, which in itself is the origin of nuclear risk". In her 2018 view of narratives surrounding the TPNW, Heather Williams of King's College London acknowledged the importance of deterrence as a security tool to many states and proposed a "bridge-building framework" involving supporters and opponents finding common ground and working together, for example, on nuclear risk reduction.

By 2020 new NFU commitments and ideas had stalled, according to Wilfred Wan, UNIDIR researcher on the global nonproliferation regime, because of the deep divide over whether they reduce risk or, for example, increase risk by undermining strategic stability, while John Borrie, lead for UNIDIR's research program on WMDs, noted that even the definition of strategic stability was evolving due to the unpredictability of and increasing strategic concerns. In the same publication, Manpreet Sethi, lead researcher for the Centre for Air Power Studies, recommended that China's and India's unilateral NFU declarations be turned into a bilateral statement as a step towards nuclear risk reduction in South Asia, "since the risk of not taking any would be quite risky indeed". The following year, the India-based Observer Research Foundation co-authored an opinion piece with Manpreet Sethi, mentioning the reintroduction of the NFU Act in both chambers of the US Congress as "hope rekindled" and noting that, given the reality of countries unwilling to give up their nuclear weapons, an NFU "allows nations to maintain a notional sense of security from their nuclear weapons, but significantly reduces possibilities of use". And in its effort to shape proposals and ideas on nuclear risk reduction "into a pathway to achieve the treaty-mandated disarmament end state of the Treaty on the Non-Proliferation of Nuclear Weapons", the Council on Strategic Risks places the universal adoption of NFU at "the starting gate for any process towards full nuclear disarmament".

According to a 2026 study, there are five reasons why states have nuclear first-use policies:

(1) threats from the combination of the conventional military balance and geography; (2) regime threats arising in conventional conflicts; (3) extended deterrence commitments to counter military threats to allies; (4) pursuit of limited conflict objectives; and (5) beliefs that damage limitation is feasible and desirable.

== See also ==
- Nuclear disarmament
- Nuclear taboo
