= Doctrine for Joint Nuclear Operations =

American military document

The Doctrine for Joint Nuclear Operations is a U.S. Department of Defense document publicly discovered in 2005 on the circumstances under which commanders of U.S. forces could request the use of nuclear weapons. The document was a draft being revised to be consistent with the Bush doctrine of preemptive attack. The label "Joint" refers to the fact that it was endorsed by the five service branches of the American military as well as the US Joint Chiefs of Staff.

== Doctrine ==
The doctrine cites eight reasons under which field commanders can ask for permission to use nuclear weapons:

- An enemy using or threatening to use WMD against the U.S., multinational, or alliance forces or civilian populations.
- To prevent an imminent biological attack.
- To attack enemy WMD launch facilities or its underground hardened CIC & storage bunkers containing deployable WMD, launch and delivery vehicles which could be used to target the U.S. or its allies.
- To stop potentially overwhelming conventional enemy forces.
- To rapidly end a war on terms favorable to the U.S.
- To ensure that U.S. and international operations are successful.
- To show the U.S. intent, capability and willingness to rapidly escalate from conventional weapons to Nuclear Defense Posture; using thermonuclear weapons to deter the enemy from using WMDs.
- To react to enemy-supplied WMD and indirect use by proxy states against the U.S., allied nations and international coalition forces, or alliance and coalition civilian populations.

== Overview ==
Below are some quotes from the executive summary of the document. Note: After public exposure, the Pentagon has cancelled the doctrine, which did not change the overall U.S. policy which includes options for nuclear preemption. The White House and Pentagon guidance stated,

The use of nuclear weapons represents a significant escalation from conventional warfare and may be provoked by some action, event, or threat. However, like any military action, the decision to use nuclear weapons is driven by the political objective sought...

Integrating conventional and nuclear attacks will ensure the most efficient use of force and provide U.S. leaders with a broader range of strike options to address immediate contingencies… This integration will ensure optimal targeting, minimal collateral damage, and reduce the probability of escalation...

Although the United States may not know with confidence what threats a state, combinations of states, or nonstate actors pose to U.S. interests, it is possible to anticipate the capabilities an adversary might use… These capabilities require maintaining a diverse mix of conventional forces capable of high-intensity, sustained, and coordinated actions across the range of military operations; employed in concert with survivable and secure nuclear forces...

The immediate and prolonged effects of nuclear weapons including blast (overpressure, dynamic pressure, ground shock, and cratering), thermal radiation (fire and other material effects), and nuclear radiation (initial, residual, fallout, blackout, and electromagnetic pulse), impose physical and psychological challenges for combat forces and noncombatant populations alike. These effects also pose significant survivability requirements on military equipment, supporting civilian infrastructure resources, and host-nation/coalition assets. U.S. forces must prepare to survive and perhaps operate in a nuclear/radiological environment.

In 2010 U.S. President Barack Obama, in a Nuclear Posture Review, announced a new policy that is much stricter about when the U.S. would order a nuclear strike.

== See also ==
- Nuclear strategy
- Nuclear Posture Review
- Nuclear weapons of the United States
- Jorge E. Hirsch
- Seymour Hersh
- Michel Chossudovsky
