= Decapitation (military strategy) =

Military strategy

Decapitation is a military strategy aimed at removing the leadership or command and control of a hostile government or group.

== In nuclear warfare ==
In nuclear warfare theory, a decapitation strike is a pre-emptive first strike attack that aims to destabilize an opponent's military and civil leadership structure in the hope that it will severely degrade or destroy its capacity for nuclear retaliation. It is essentially a subset of a counterforce strike but whereas a counterforce strike seeks to destroy weapons directly, a decapitation strike is designed to remove an enemy's ability to use its weapons. There is also delegation of ICBM/SLBM launch capability to local commanders in the event of a decapitation strike.

== Conventional warfare, assassination and terrorist acts ==
Decapitation strikes have been employed as a strategy in conventional warfare. The term has been used to describe the assassination of a government's entire leadership group or a nation's royal family. In counter-terrorism, leadership "decapitation tactics" as a kinetic military strategy have been deployed by countries such as Nigeria, the United States of America, and Israel in their fight against the expansion and influence of terrorist groups. As an approach to kinetic warfare, decapitation strategy involves three routes: (1) killing, (2) capturing, or (3) capturing and then killing the leader(s) of terrorist groups.

- The 2003 U.S. invasion of Iraq began with a decapitation strike against Saddam Hussein and other Iraqi military and political leaders. These air strikes failed to kill their intended targets.
- The U.S. and its NATO allies have, and continue to pursue this strategy in its efforts to dismantle militant Islamist networks, such as Al-Qaeda and ISIL, that threaten the United States and allies.
- Assassination of Qasem Soleimani by US military is described by some analytics as example of decapitation strike.
- Assassination attempts on Volodymyr Zelenskyy during the Russo-Ukrainian war
- September 17, 2024 Lebanon pager explosions: An Israeli supply-chain attack on Hezbollah communication devices. AR-924 model pagers distributed by GOLD APOLLO were filled with explosives and acquired by Hezbollah, but widely used among civilians at the time. The explosions have been theorized to be a decapitation strike and prelude to the potential invasion of Southern Lebanon by Israel during the Israel–Hezbollah conflict.
- The Assassination of Ali Khamenei at the start of the 2026 Iran War has been described as a decapitation strike.

In warfare since the early 21st century, unmanned aerial vehicles, or drones, have been popularly used for decapitation strikes against terrorist and insurgent groups. Drones are most effective in areas with inadequate air defense. There are mixed scholarly opinions whether or not decapitation strikes via drones effectively degrade the capabilities of these groups.

Some military strategists, like General Michael Flynn, have argued that the experience gained by the American and Coalition military experience from fighting the Taliban insurgency in Afghanistan was in support of kill or capture operations, but that they would be ineffective without a full understanding of how they would affect the local political landscape in the country.

Robert Pape has argued that decapitation is a relatively ineffective strategy. He writes that decapitation is a seductive strategy as it promises "to solve conflicts quickly and cheaply with... little collateral damage, and minimal or no friendly casualties", but decapitation strikes frequently fail or are not likely to produce the intended consequences even if successful.

Counterterrorism theorists Max Abrahms and Jochen Mierau argue that leadership decapitation in a terrorist or rebel group has the tendency to create disorder within the group, but find decapitation ineffective because group disorder can often lead to politically ineffective, unfocused attacks on civilians. The two conclude that "[t]his change in the internal composition of militant groups may affect the quality and hence selectivity of their violence."

One tactic that is sometimes used to inform the target selection for decapitation strikes is social network analysis. This tactic involves identifying and eliminating higher ranked members in a hierarchically arranged rebel or terrorist group by targeting lower members first, and using intelligence gained in initial strikes to identify an organization's leadership. Some strategists, like Generals David Petraeus and Stanley McChrystal, have also called for dedicated task units that are non-hierarchical and can be reorganized, in order to face similar distributed or decentralized terrorist groups. Others, however, argue that decapitation strikes combined with social network analysis are counterproductive because they can prolong a conflict due to their tendency to eliminate rebel or terrorist leaders who are the most capable peace negotiators or have the potential to advance communities hardest hit by terror campaigns after the cessation of hostilities.

== See also ==
- Continuity of government
- Designated survivor
- Preemptive war
- Preventive war
- Samson Option
- Targeted killing
- List of military strategies and concepts
- List of military tactics
- Operation Looking Glass
- Burr dilemma - a kind of "decapitation" in party politics.
