= Second strike =

Response to a powerful first nuclear strike

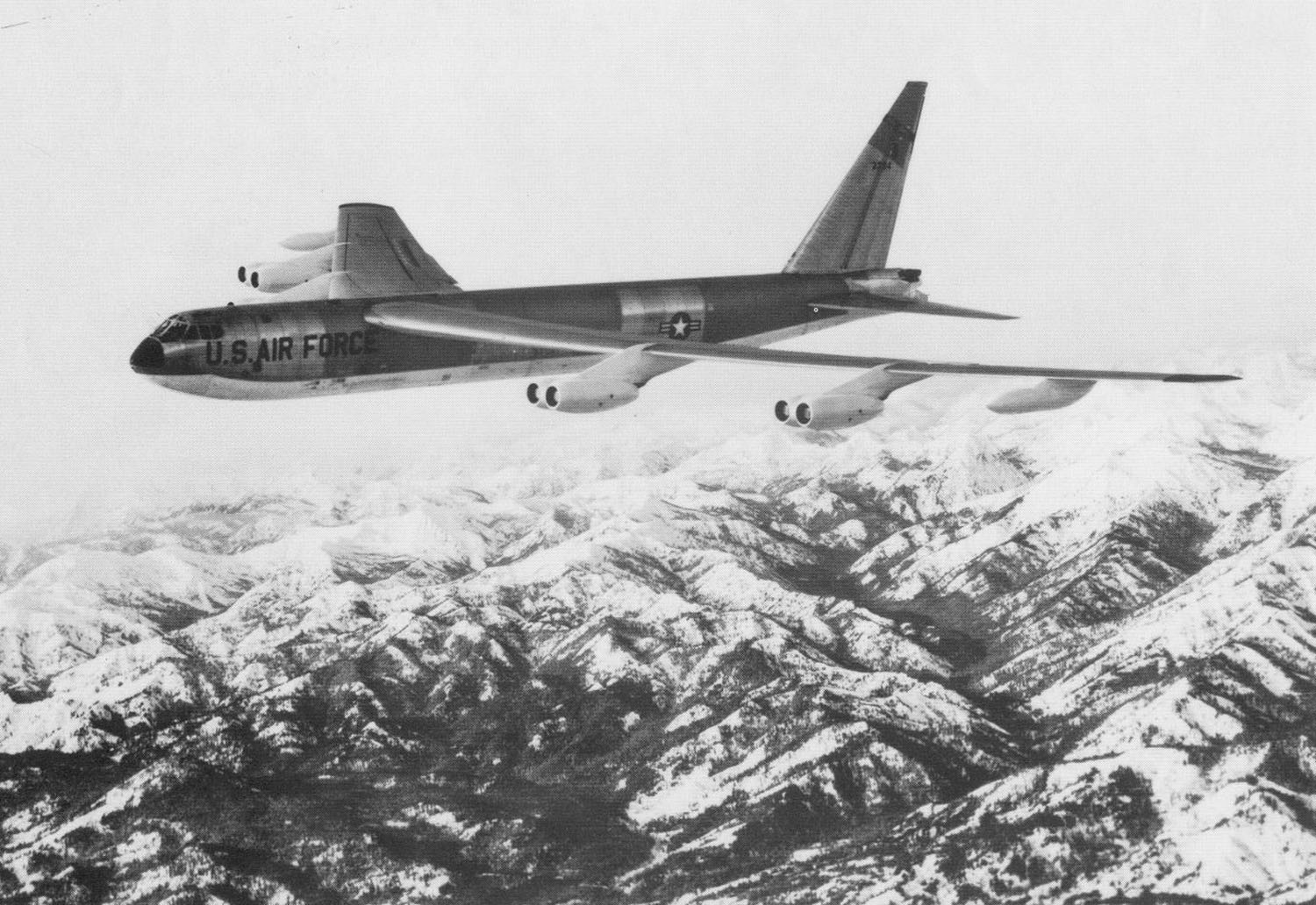
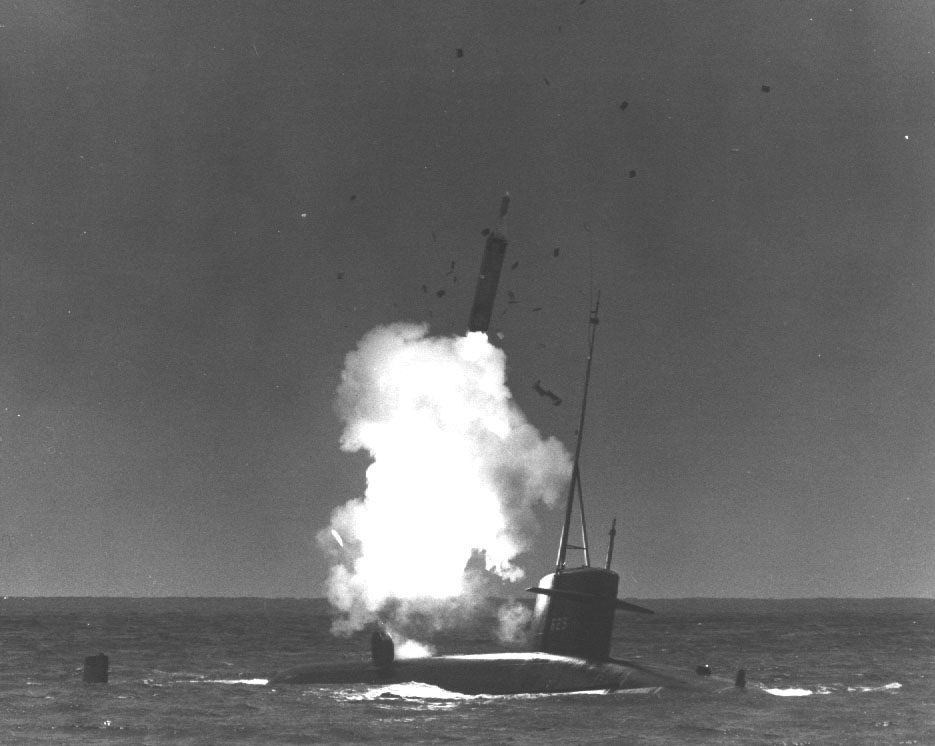
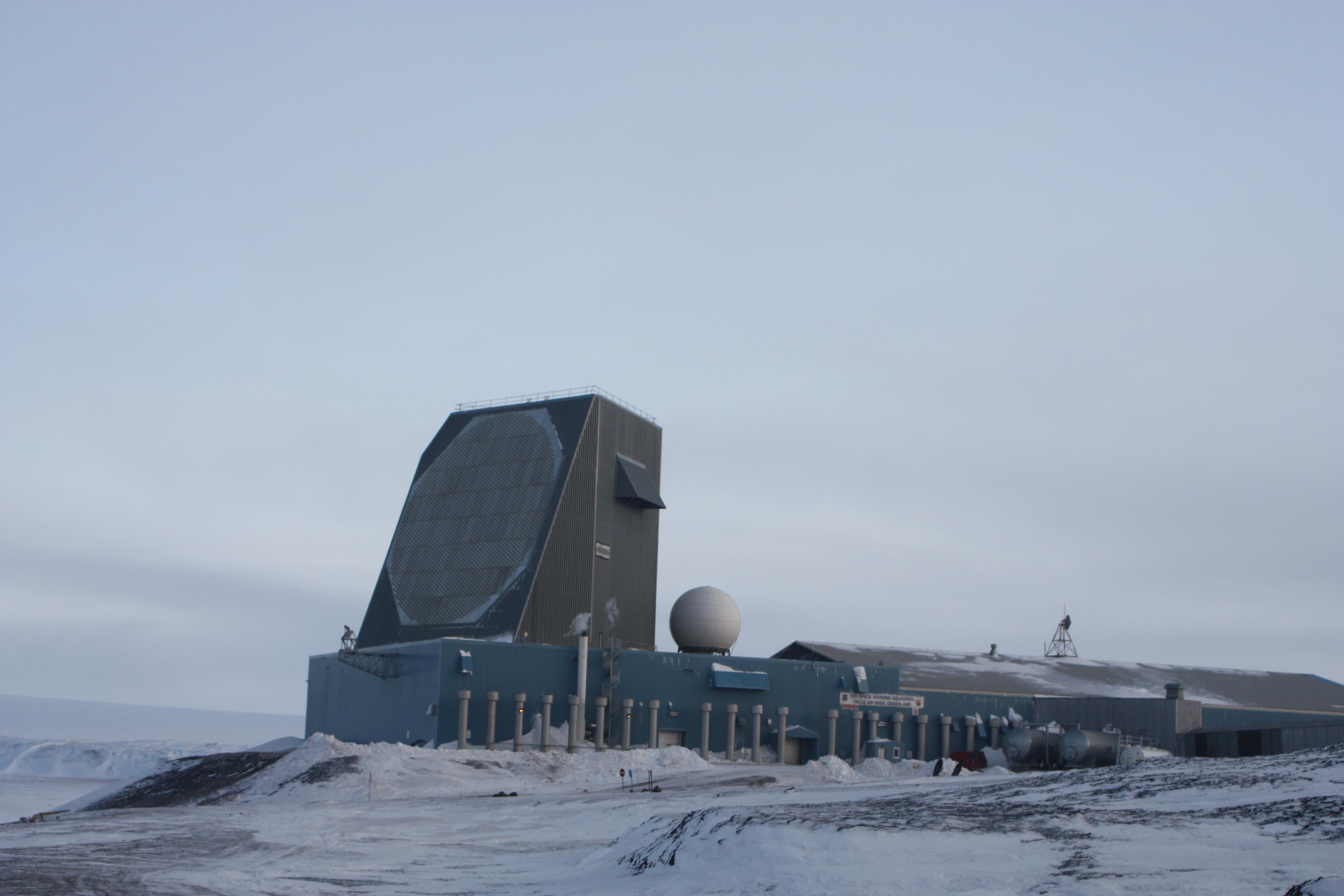
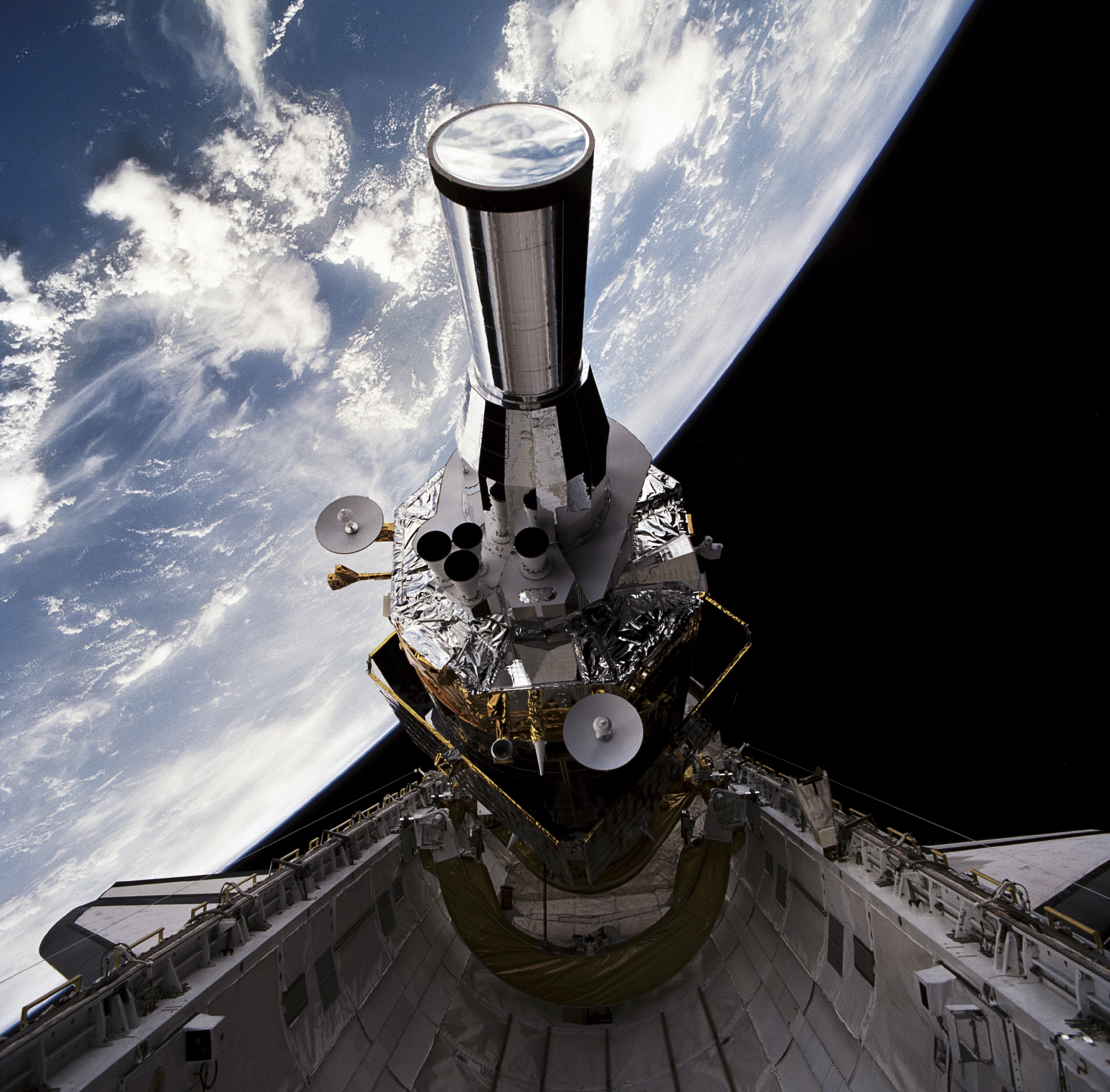
From top, left to right
1. USAF Boeing B-52B in flight; airborne alert historically provided second strike capability
2. Submarine-launched ballistic missiles are a standard and near-invulnerable second strike capability
3. Early warning radars contribute to coordinating a second strike
4. Early warning satellites contribute to coordinating a second strike

In nuclear strategy, a retaliatory strike or second-strike capability is a country's assured ability to respond to a nuclear attack with powerful nuclear retaliation against the attacker. To have such an ability (and to convince an opponent of its viability) is considered vital in nuclear deterrence, as otherwise the other side might attempt to win a nuclear war in one massive first strike against its opponent's own nuclear forces.

== Theory ==
The possession of second-strike capabilities counters a first-strike nuclear threat and can support a no first use nuclear strategy. Reciprocal second-strike capabilities usually cause a mutual assured destruction defence strategy, though one side may have a lower level minimal deterrence response.

Second-strike capabilities can be further strengthened by implementing fail-deadly mechanisms. These mechanisms create a threshold and guaranteed consequences if that threshold is breached. For instance, a threshold may be for an allied nation not to be attacked. If a rival nation then breaches this threshold by attacking the allied nation, then the predetermined consequences for this action go into effect. These predetermined consequences could include a wide range of responses, including a retaliatory nuclear second strike.

== Implementation ==
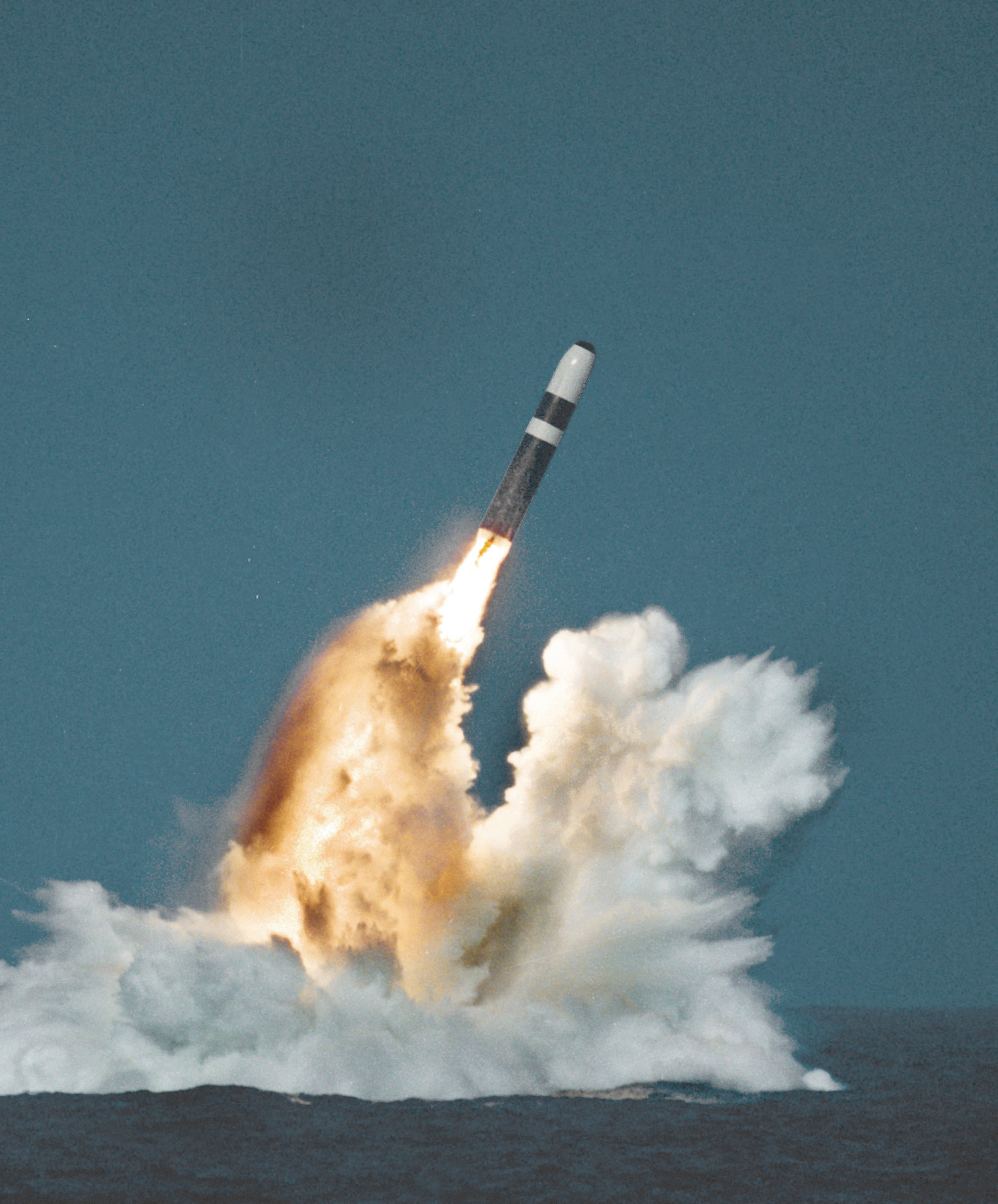
A Trident II missile launched from a Royal Navy Vanguard-class ballistic missile submarine

The crucial goal in maintaining second-strike capabilities is preventing first-strike attacks from taking out a nation's nuclear arsenal. In this manner, a country can carry out nuclear retaliation even after absorbing a nuclear attack. The United States and other countries have diversified their nuclear arsenals through the nuclear triad in order to better ensure second-strike capability.

Submarine-launched ballistic missiles are the traditional, but very expensive, method of providing a second strike capability, though they need to be supported by a reliable method of identifying who the attacker is. Using SLBMs as a second-strike capability has a serious problem, because in retaliation for a submarine-launched ICBM, the wrong country could be targeted, and can cause a conflict to escalate. However, implementation of second strikes is crucial to deter a first strike. Countries with nuclear weapons make it their primary purpose to convince their opponents that a first strike is not worth facing a second strike. Such countries have many diverse launch mechanisms, prepared responses to various nuclear attack scenarios, launch mechanisms in many different areas of the country, and underground launch facilities that are specifically designed to withstand a nuclear attack.

Launch on warning is a strategy of nuclear weapon retaliation that gained recognition during the Cold War between the Western Bloc and the Eastern Bloc. In addition to the nuclear triad, nations deploy an early warning system that detects incoming nuclear missiles. This gives that nation the capability and option to launch a retaliatory second strike before the incoming nuclear first strike hits any of its targets. This is another method of solidifying second-strike capabilities and deterring a first strike from another nuclear power.

Because of the low accuracy (circular error probable) of early-generation intercontinental ballistic missiles (and especially submarine-launched ballistic missiles), second strike was initially only possible against very large, undefended countervalue targets like cities. Later-generation missiles with much improved accuracy made second-strike counterforce attacks against the opponent's hardened military facilities possible.

=== Perimetr-PTS ===
Perimetr-PTS, otherwise known as "мёртвая рука" (the Dead Hand) within Russia, is a Russian nuclear deterrence developed to automatically launch ballistic missiles as a retaliatory attack in the event that the Russian command and control system is destroyed in a surprise decapitation strike.

Perimetr PTS dates back to 1974, in response to Soviet fears of devastating nuclear strikes from US ballistic missile submarines. It became operational in January 1985, with SS-17 launch silos in Vypolzovo (Yedrovo) and Kostroma, each 100 and 150 miles north-west of Moscow respectively. The system was built with multiple layers of redundancy, in case multiple layers of communications were destroyed in the initial strike. Launch authorization would be transmitted by UHF radio, by transmitters buried deep underground. Development continued over the years with the system incorporating the new RT-2PM2 Topol-M ICBMs in December 1990, and further refinements in 1996.

Russian leadership was concerned that the system could trigger an accidental launch, so they incorporated numerous safeguards into its design.

1. Initially, both the Vyuga nuclear command link to Russian leadership and the secure Kazbek communications system must be interrupted. The simultaneous loss of both systems would indicate that the national command post has been destroyed and the political leadership killed.
2. Secondly, the General Staff would have had to escalate the threat level sufficiently high so that a preauthorisation for launch had already been attained prior to loss of communications. If this had not been received, it was up to the missile operators within the silos to abort the automated launch.
3. Third, the collective input of data from a variety of sensors fed into a central server. This included ground and infrared sensors designed to detect explosions around early-warning radar stations, command posts, and silos; missile signatures from radar stations, and data from the Oko early warning satellite system. Perimetr-PTS was deliberately designed not to launch in the event of a smaller strike from US allies or an Asian nuclear power, given their inability to wage 'total war'. It was also designed to discount the possibility of an earthquake or natural disaster, by referencing data from seismograph stations.

It has been alleged sometimes, that Russian nuclear command and control could order missiles to self-destruct mid-flight in the event of an accidental launch. However, such claims have been disputed by experts, because a self-destructible system could potentially be exploited by an enemy to disable missiles before they reach their targets.

Russian ballistic missile submarines were reportedly never incorporated into Perimetr-PTS, given the inherent communication issues which could ensue.

== History ==
As early as 1940, science fiction writer Robert A. Heinlein wrote the science fiction short story Solution Unsatisfactory in which he described a nuclear arms race during the Cold War between the United States and the Soviet Union. In one episode, the US cabinet discusses the scenario of a Soviet surprise attack in which American cities would be destroyed, but the US armed forces would survive and launch a counter-attack.

== See also ==
- Minimal deterrence
- Doomsday device
- 1983 Soviet nuclear false alarm incident
- Mutual assured destruction
- COGCON
