= Countervalue =

High amount of value outside a military, in strategy studies concerning targeting

In nuclear strategy, countervalue is the targeting of an opponent's assets that are of value but not actually a military threat, such as cities and civilian populations. Counterforce is the targeting of an opponent's military forces and facilities. The Oxford English Dictionary, 2nd ed., records the first use of the word in 1660 and the first use in the modern sense in 1965 in which it is described as a "euphemism for attacking cities".

== Theory ==
In warfare, particularly nuclear warfare, enemy targets can be divided into two general types: counterforce military targets and countervalue civilian targets. Those terms were not used during the Second World War bombing of civilian populations and other targets that were not directly military.

The rationale behind countervalue targeting is that if two sides have both achieved assured destruction capability, and the nuclear arsenals of both sides have the apparent ability to survive a wide range of counterforce attacks and carry out a second strike in response, the value diminishes in an all-out nuclear war of targeting the opponent's nuclear arsenal, and the value of targeting the opponent's cities and civilians increases. That line of reasoning, however, assumes that the opponent values its civilians over its military forces. Consequently, the credible threat of countervalue targeting serves as the strategic foundation of Mutually Assured Destruction (MAD). Beyond its role in final retaliation, however, countervalue capability is also viewed as a tool for intra-war bargaining. According to theorists like Thomas Schelling, countervalue targets function strategically as "hostages." According to this view, the primary benefit of countervalue capability is not the destruction itself but the threat of future destruction. By withholding attacks on cities while maintaining the capability to destroy them, a state retains the leverage necessary to force an adversary to end a conflict. Paradoxically, immediate destruction of the cities would eliminate this leverage, as the opponent would no longer have anything left to lose.

One view argues that countervalue targeting upholds nuclear deterrence because both sides are more likely to believe in each other's no first use policy. The line of reasoning is that if an aggressor strikes first with nuclear weapons against an opponent's countervalue targets, such an attack, by definition, does not degrade its opponent's military capacity to retaliate. The opposing view counters that countervalue targeting is neither moral nor credible because, if an aggressor strikes first with nuclear weapons against only a limited number of a defender's counterforce military targets, the defender should not retaliate in this situation against the aggressor's civilian populace, as this would likely constitute a major escalation of such a conflict. However, another position is that because the aggressor starts the conflict, it should not be treated with a "gloves-on" approach (i.e., severity of retaliation should not be reduced deliberately to avoid escalation), which would give a further incentive to be an aggressor, or produce a presumptively weaker deterrent effect.

== Historical development ==
During the 1950s, U.S. nuclear strategy under the doctrine of "Massive Retaliation" relied on the threat of an all-out nuclear response to any form of aggression. Early war plans, such as SIOP-62, lacked flexibility and effectively threatened massive urban destruction as a byproduct of large-scale strikes against a combined set of military and industrial targets. The specific strategic debate regarding the separation of targeting categories solidified under U.S. Secretary of Defense Robert McNamara. In 1962, McNamara initially proposed a "No Cities" counterforce doctrine, seeking to limit nuclear war to military installations while sparing civilian population centers to maintain a chance for negotiation.

However, this approach proved destabilizing in practice, as it incentivized an arms race and was perceived by the Soviet Union as preparation for a disarming first strike. By the mid-1960s, McNamara moved away from "No Cities" as a public doctrine and established Assured Destruction as the primary criterion for force sizing. This concept prioritized a secure countervalue capability - specifically, the ability to absorb a surprise attack and retaliate with sufficient force to destroy the aggressor's society. McNamara quantified this requirement as the capability to destroy 30% of the Soviet population and 50% of its industrial capacity. This shift institutionalized countervalue targeting as the ultimate deterrent required for strategic stability, even though military targets (counterforce) remained part of operational war planning.

After the Cold War, the explicit reliance on countervalue targeting diminished in official doctrine but remained a latent aspect of deterrence. While modern U.S. strategy emphasizes precision counterforce, analysts note that countervalue remains the ultimate backstop. According to the 2024 Report on the Nuclear Employment Strategy, U.S. planning "does not rely on a counter-value or minimum-deterrence approach" and instead emphasizes the need for counterforce capabilities. The Guidance further mandates that all nuclear plans be consistent with the Law of Armed Conflict, which prohibits the intentional targeting of civilian populations. However, the strategy maintains a link to the concept of value by focusing on holding at risk "what adversaries value most". This approach prioritizes an adversary's leadership, command structures, and war-supporting infrastructure. However, critics argue because these targets are frequently located within major urban centers, the strategy maintains a latent countervalue effect despite its legal constraints.

Beyond the United States, several nuclear-armed states incorporate countervalue logic to achieve "minimum deterrence." This posture, utilized by China and India, prioritizes a survivable second-strike capability to deter existential threats, including conventional invasion, while avoiding a resource-intensive counterforce arms race. Conversely, states such as Russia and Pakistan envision a more expansive nuclear role to mitigate the conventional superiority of adversaries. Strategic analysts observe that for emerging nuclear powers, countervalue targeting remains a more attainable and thus credible deterrent than the high-precision requirements of a comprehensive counterforce strategy.

== International law ==
The intentional targeting of civilians with military force, such as nuclear weapons, is prohibited by international law. In particular, the Fourth Geneva Convention forbids attacks on certain types of civilian targets, and Protocol I states that civilian objects are not acceptable military targets. (Not all states are party to Protocol I.) Nonetheless, "proportionate" collateral damage is allowed, which could justify attacks on military objectives in cities. Many strategic military facilities like bomber airfields were located near cities. Command and control centers were located in Moscow; Washington, DC; and other cities.

However, a tension exists between the strategic requirements of countervalue deterrence and the principles of international humanitarian law. While countervalue targeting is often considered necessary for mutual deterrence (under the logic of MAD), it directly conflicts with the principle of distinction. In its 1996 Advisory Opinion on the Legality of the Threat or Use of Nuclear Weapons, the International Court of Justice (ICJ) concluded that the threat or use of nuclear weapons would "generally be contrary to the rules of international law applicable in armed conflict" particularly the prohibition against targeting civilians. Nevertheless, the Court could not conclude definitively on the legality of such a threat in an "extreme circumstance of self-defence, in which the very survival of a State would be at stake." Nuclear-armed states frequently cite this legal ambiguity to justify maintaining countervalue capabilities as an ultimate deterrent within their strategic doctrines.

== See also ==
- First strike (nuclear strategy)
- Second strike
- Counterforce
- Mutually Assured Destruction
- Deterrence theory
- Peace through strength
- Balance of terror
- Balance of power in international relations
- Revenge
- Scorched earth
- Countervalue Series by Tristan Hrominchuk
