= First strike (nuclear strategy) =

Preemptive attack using nuclear weapons

In nuclear strategy, a first strike or preemptive strike is a preemptive surprise attack employing overwhelming force. First strike capability is an attacking country's ability to significantly cripple another nuclear power's second strike retaliatory capacity. The preferred methodology is to attack the opponent's strategic nuclear weapon facilities (missile silos, submarine bases, bomber airfields), command and control sites (a decapitation strike), and storage depots first. The strategy is called counterforce.

During the 1950s, first strike strategy required strategic bomber sorties taking place over hours and days. In the 1960s, the deployment of intercontinental ballistic missiles cut the first strike duration to 30 minutes. Also during the Cold War, medium- and intermediate-range ballistic missiles, such as those involved in the Cuban Missile Crisis and Euromissile Crisis, as well as submarine-launched ballistic missiles, reduced the time even further, often below 10 minutes.

Second strike countermeasures to effectively deter first strikes include early warning systems, launch on warning for missile silos, dispersal of transporter erector launcher trucks carrying missiles and of bombers to more remote sites, continuous ballistic missile submarine and airborne bomber patrols.

== Historical background ==
First-strike attack, the use of a nuclear first strike capability, was greatly feared during the Cold War between NATO and the Soviet Bloc. At various points, fear of a first strike attack existed on both sides. Misunderstood changes in posture and well understood changes in technology used by either side often led to speculation regarding the enemy's intentions.

=== 1948–1961 ===
In the aftermath of World War II, the leadership of the Soviet Union feared the United States would use its nuclear superiority to initiate a full-scale attack, as from 1945 to 1948 the U.S. was the only state possessing nuclear weapons and until the late 1960s preserved an overwhelming superiority. The USSR countered by rapidly developing their own nuclear weapons, surprising the US with their first test in 1949. In turn, the U.S. countered by developing the vastly more powerful thermonuclear weapon, testing their first hydrogen bomb in 1952 at Ivy Mike, but the USSR quickly countered by testing their own thermonuclear weapons, with a test in 1953 of a semi-thermonuclear weapon of the Sloika design, and in 1956, with the testing of Sakharov's Third Idea – equivalent to the Castle Bravo device. Meanwhile, tensions between the two nations rose as 1956 saw Soviet invasion of Hungary; the U.S. and European nations drew certain conclusions from that event, while in the U.S., a powerful social backlash was afoot, prompted by Senator Joseph McCarthy, the House Un-American Activities Committee, and Julius and Ethel Rosenberg, U.S. citizens executed in 1953 after conviction of espionage. This atmosphere was further inflamed by the 1957 launch of Sputnik, which led to fears of Communists attacking from outer space, as well as concerns that if the Soviets could launch a device into orbit, they could equally cause a device to re-enter the atmosphere and impact any part of the planet. John F. Kennedy capitalized on this situation by emphasizing the bomber gap and the missile gap, areas in which the Soviets were (inaccurately) perceived as leading the United States, while heated Soviet rhetoric added to political pressure. The 1960 U-2 incident, involving Francis Gary Powers, as well as the Berlin Crisis, along with the test of the Tsar Bomba, escalated tensions still further.

=== Cuban Missile Crisis ===
This escalating situation came to a head with the Cuban Missile Crisis of 1962. The arrival of Soviet missiles in Cuba was conducted by the Soviets on the rationale that the US already had nuclear missiles stationed in Turkey, as well as the desire by Fidel Castro to increase his power, his freedom of action, and to protect his government from US invasion, such as had been attempted during the Bay of Pigs Invasion in April 1961. During the crisis, Fidel Castro wrote Khrushchev a letter about the prospect that the "imperialists" would be "extremely dangerous" if they responded militarily to the Soviet stationing of nuclear missiles aimed at US territory, less than 90 miles away in Cuba. The following quotation from the letter suggests that Castro was calling for a Soviet first strike against the US if it responded militarily to the placement of nuclear missiles aimed at the US in Cuba:

If the second variant takes place and the imperialists invade Cuba with the aim of occupying it, the dangers of their aggressive policy are so great that after such an invasion the Soviet Union must never allow circumstances in which the imperialists could carry out a nuclear first strike against it. I tell you this because I believe that the imperialists' aggressiveness makes them extremely dangerous, and that if they manage to carry out an invasion of Cuba—a brutal act in violation of universal and moral law—then that would be the moment to eliminate this danger forever, in an act of the most legitimate self-defense. However harsh and terrible the solution, there would be no other.

The Cuban Missile Crisis resulted in Nikita Khrushchev publicly agreeing to remove the missiles from Cuba, while John F. Kennedy secretly agreed to remove his country's missiles from Turkey. Both sides in the Cold War realized how close they came to nuclear war over Cuba, and decided to seek a reduction of tensions, resulting in US-Soviet détente for most of the 1960s and 1970s.

Nonetheless, this reduction of tensions only applied to the US and the USSR. Recently declassified interviews with high level former Soviet nuclear and military–industrial planners reveal that Fidel Castro continued to favour nuclear options, even during the later Cold War – according to former Soviet General Andrian Danilevich, "(...in the early 1980s...) Cuban leader Fidel Castro pressed the USSR to take a tougher line against the United States, including possible nuclear strikes. The Soviet Union, in response, sent experts to spell out for Castro the ecological consequences for Cuba of nuclear strikes on the United States. Castro, according to the general, quickly became convinced of the undesirability of such outcomes."

=== 1970s/1980s ===
However, tensions were inflamed again in the late 1970s and early 1980s with the Soviet invasion of Afghanistan, the Soviet deployment of the SS-20 Saber and the SS-18 Satan, and the decision of NATO to deploy the new Pershing II IRBM as well as the Tomahawk Ground Launched Cruise Missile, along with U.S. President Ronald Reagan's talk of 'limited' nuclear war. This increased Soviet fears that NATO was planning an attack. NATO's deployment of these missiles was a response to the Soviet deployment of the SS-20 Saber, which could hit most European NATO bases within minutes of launch. These mutual deployments led to a destabilizing strategic situation, which was exacerbated by malfunctioning U.S. and Soviet missile launch early warning systems, a Soviet intelligence gap that prevented the Soviets from getting a "read" on the strategic intentions of U.S. leaders, as well as inflammatory U.S. rhetoric combined with classical Soviet mistrust of the NATO powers. This culminated in a war scare that occurred during 1983 due to the inopportune timing of a NATO exercise called Able Archer, which was a simulation of a NATO nuclear attack on the Soviet Union; this exercise happened to occur during a massive Soviet intelligence mobilization called VRYAN, that was designed to discover intentions of NATO to initiate a nuclear first-strike. This poor timing drove the world close to nuclear war, possibly even closer than the Cuban Missile Crisis over 20 years before.

== Terms used ==
- CEP – circular error probable; the radius within which a weapon aimed at a given point will land with a 50% confidence; for example, a CEP of 150 m indicates that 50% of the time, the weapon will impact within 150 m of the target. This measure of accuracy assumes that everything up to the point of impact works correctly.
- Range – the maximum distance from a target a weapon can be fired to successfully hit the point where it is targeted at. (When range is used without qualifiers, like maximum or minimum, it is assumed that it refers to maximum; however, a number of these described weapons have minimum ranges as well, though they are not mentioned, or, in all likelihood, even known to the public.)
- kt/Mt – This is an approximate measure of how much energy is released by the detonation of a nuclear weapon; kt stands for kilotons TNT, Mt stands for megatons TNT. Conventional science of the period contemporary to the Manhattan project came up with these measures so as to reasonably analogize the incredible energy of a nuclear detonation in a form that would be understandable to the military, politicians, or civilians. Trinitrotoluene (TNT) was and is a high explosive with industrial and military uses, and is around 40% more powerfully explosive than an equivalent weight of gunpowder. A ton is equivalent to 1000 kg or approximately 2200 pounds. A 20 kt nuclear device, therefore, liberates as much energy as does the explosion of 20,000 tons of TNT (this is the origin of the term, for the exact definition see TNT equivalent). This is a large quantity of energy. In addition, unlike TNT, the detonation of a nuclear device also emits ionizing radiation that can harm living organisms, including humans; the prompt radiation from the blast itself and the fallout can persist for a long period of time, though within hours to weeks, the radiation from a single nuclear detonation will drop enough to permit humans to remain at the site of the blast indefinitely without incurring acute fatal exposure to radiation.

== Likely first strike weapons systems ==
Because of the low accuracy (large circular error probable) of early generation intercontinental ballistic missiles (and especially submarine-launched ballistic missiles), counterforce strikes were initially only possible against large, undefended targets like bomber airfields and naval bases. Later generation missiles with much improved accuracy made counterforce attacks against the opponent's hardened military facilities (like missile silos and command and control centers) possible. This is due to the inverse-square law, which predicts that the amount of energy dispersed from a single point release of energy (such as a thermonuclear blast) dissipates by the inverse of the square of distance from the single point of release. The result is that the power of a nuclear explosion to rupture hardened structures is greatly decreased by the distance from the impact point of the nuclear weapon. So a near-direct hit is generally necessary, as only diminishing returns are gained by increasing bomb power.

- Pershing II MRBM. Single warhead, variable yield 5–50 kt, CEP 50 m with active radar terminal guidance. Short, 7-minute flight-time and range of 1,800 km, designed to strike C^{4}ISTAR installations, bunkers, air fields, air defense sites, and ICBM silos in the European part of the Soviet Union. Decommissioned.
- R-36 (NATO designation SS-18 "Satan"), MIRV. Believed to be a first-strike weapon by some in the West, due to high accuracy of 220 m CEP, and high throw-weight of 8,800 kg; could deploy 40 penetration aids and deliver at least 10 warheads of at least 500 kt through independent, separate targets. Each warhead could probably take out even hardened nuclear silos, such as those used by the Minuteman III. Deployed in 1976, aimed at CONUS. Still in service.
- LGM-118 Peacekeeper. Similar in capability to the SS-18 Satan, the Peacekeeper had a throw-weight of 4,000 kg, and could carry only 10 MIRVed warheads of 300 kt each, as well as a CEP of 120 meters. Deployed in the mid-1980s. Decommissioned; however, guidance systems and re-entry vehicles moved to Minuteman III missiles.
- SS-20 Saber MIRV IRBM. Deployed by the Soviet Union in the late 1970s, this MIRVed IRBM could hide out behind the Urals in Asian Russia and strike NATO C^{4}ISTAR facilities in Europe with scarcely any warning, due to short flight time, high accuracy, and MIRV payload (rare on an intermediate-range missile). Decommissioned.

== First-strike enabling weapons systems ==
Any missile defense system capable of wide-area (e.g., continental) coverage, and especially those enabling destruction of missiles in the boost phase, is a first-strike-enabling weapon because it allows for a nuclear strike to be launched with reduced fear of mutual assured destruction. Such a system has never been deployed, although a limited continental missile defense capability has been deployed by the U.S., but it is capable of defending against only a handful of missiles.

This does not apply, in general, to terminal missile defense systems, such as the former U.S. Safeguard Program or the Russian A-35/A-135 systems. Limited-area terminal missile defense systems, defending such targets as ICBM fields, or C^{4}ISTAR facilities may, in fact, be stabilizing, because they ensure survivable retaliatory capacity, and/or survivable de-escalation capacity.

This also might not apply to a "non-discriminatory" space-based missile defense system, even if it is—actually, precisely because it is—of global reach. Such a system would be designed to destroy all weapons launched by any nation in a ballistic trajectory, negating any nation's capability to launch any strike with ballistic missiles, assuming the system was sufficiently robust to repel attacks from all potential threats, and built to open standards openly agreed upon and adhered to. No such system has yet been seriously proposed.

== Other possible first-strike weapons systems ==
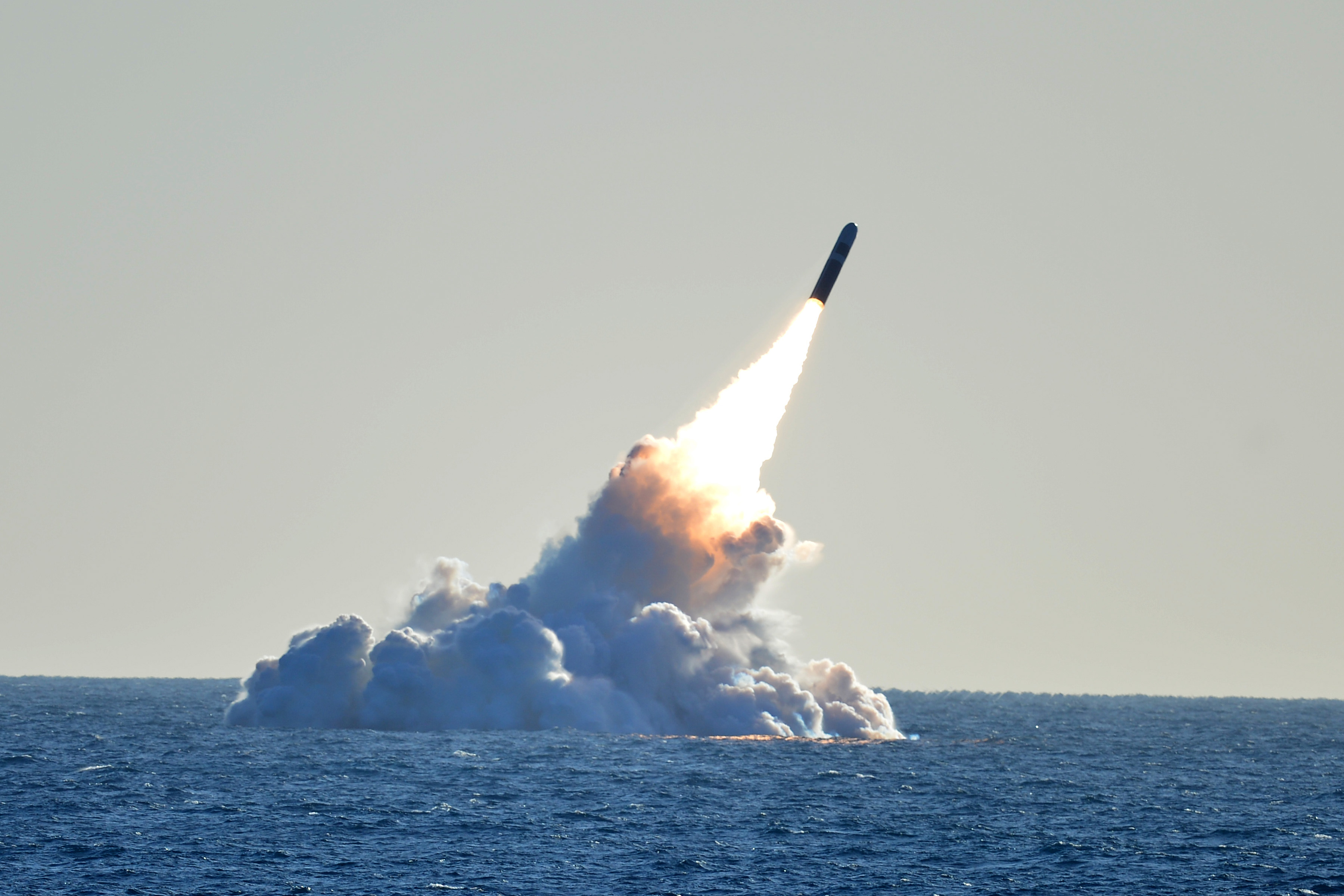
Trident II D5 is one of the most advanced submarine-launched ballistic missiles

- UGM-133 Trident II missiles may carry up to 8, 100 kt W76 (C4) or 12 (START-limited 8, SORT-limited 5) W76 or 475 kt W88 MIRVed warheads (D5). The circular error probability of the weapons is classified but is believed to be less than 120 m (C4) and 100 m (D5). The missile attains a temporary low altitude orbit only a few minutes after launch. The guidance system for the missile is an inertial guidance system with an additional star-sighting system, which is used to correct small positional errors that have accrued during the flight. GPS has been used on some test flights but is assumed not to be available for a real mission. Trident I-C4 has a range of over 4,000 nmi, and the Trident II-D5 can surpass 6,000 nmi; however, the absolute ranges of the missiles are classified and withheld from public domain for reasons of national security.
- R-36 (SS-18 Satan) Mod I/II 25 megaton variant. Although it is widely accepted that Soviets never had a first-strike strategy because of their conventional arms superiority in Europe, some experts believed that the single-warhead 25 megaton version of R36-M (SS-18, CEP 250 m) was a first-strike weapon targeted against Minuteman III silos. However, a much more logical explanation comes from retired Soviet military officers, who report that the 25 megaton SS-18 was targeted against heavily fortified command-and-control facilities. The reason is that a single 25 megaton warhead could take out only one hardened missile silo if the silos are sufficiently separated—probably by only 2–4 km, depending on the amount of hardening because of the inverse square law, which predicts that the amount of energy dispersed from a single point release of energy (such as a thermonuclear blast) dissipates by the inverse of the square of distance from the single point of release. Therefore, the power of a nuclear explosion to rupture hardened structures is greatly decreased by the distance from the impact point of the nuclear weapon. Therefore, a nearly direct hit is generally necessary, as only diminishing returns are gained by increasing bomb power. The only purpose for gigantic nuclear weapons like the SS-18 25 megaton variant is to take out extremely hardened targets, like command-and-control facilities, such as NORAD, located at the Cheyenne Mountain Complex; Federal Emergency Management Agency (FEMA), located at Mount Weather; or Site R, located at Raven Rock. (The amount of energy needed to rupture missile silos is orders of magnitude greater than the amount necessary to destroy cities, which made the SS-18 25 megaton variant effective for the destruction of large urban centers, as well.) This could be a useful weapon for a decapitation strike, but that is a risky move, and both the U.S. and Russia have extensive countermeasures against such methods.

== Anti-first-strike countermeasures ==
According to the theories of nuclear deterrence and mutual assured destruction, full countervalue retaliation would be the likely fate for any state that unleashed a first strike. To maintain credible deterrence, nuclear-weapons states have taken measures to give their enemies reason to believe that a first strike would lead to unacceptable results.

The main strategy relies on creating doubt among enemy strategists regarding nuclear capacity, weapons characteristics, facility and infrastructure vulnerability, early warning systems, intelligence penetration, strategic plans, and political will. In terms of military capabilities, the aim is to create the impression of the maximum possible force and survivability, which leads the enemy to make increased estimates of the probability of a disabling counterstrike, and in terms of strategy and politics, the aim is to cause the enemy to believe that such a second strike would be forthcoming in the event of a nuclear attack.

=== Second strike ===
One of the main reasons to deter a first strike is the possibility of the victim of the first-strike launching a retaliatory second strike on the attacker.

=== Increasing SSBN deployment ===
Nuclear-powered ballistic missile submarines (SSBNs) carrying submarine-launched ballistic missiles (SLBMs), commonly known as "boomers" in the US and "bombers" in the UK, are widely considered the most survivable component of the nuclear triad. The depths of the ocean are extremely large, and nuclear submarines are mobile, quiet, have virtually unlimited range, and can generate their own oxygen and potable water. In essence, their undersea endurance is limited only by food supply. It is unlikely that any conceivable opponent of any nuclear power deploying ballistic missile submarines can locate and neutralize every ballistic missile submarine before it launches a retaliatory strike in the event of war. Therefore, to increase the percentage of nuclear forces surviving a first strike, a nation can simply increase SSBN deployment and the deployment of reliable communications links with SSBNs.

=== Hardening or mobilizing land-based nuclear assets ===
In addition, land-based ICBM silos can be hardened. No missile launch facility can really defend against a direct nuclear hit, but a sufficiently hardened silo could defend against a near miss, especially if the detonation is not from a multimegaton thermonuclear weapon. In addition, ICBMs can be placed on road or rail-mobile launchers (RT-23 Molodets, RT-2PM2 Topol-M, DF-31, Agni 5, Agni 6, MGM-134 Midgetman), which can then be moved around. As an enemy has nothing fixed at which to aim, that increases its survivability.

=== Increasing alert state and readiness ===
The effectiveness of a first strike is contingent upon the aggressor's ability to deplete its enemy's retaliatory capacity immediately to a level that would make a second strike impossible, mitigable, or strategically undesirable. Intelligence and early warning systems increase the probability that the enemy has the time to launch its own strike before its warmaking capacity has been significantly reduced, which renders a first strike pointless. Alert states such as DEFCON conditions, apart from serving a purpose in the internal management of a country's military, can have the effect of advising a potential aggressor that an escalation towards first strike has been detected and therefore that effective retaliatory strikes could be made in the event of an attack.

=== Maintaining survivable C^{4}ISTAR links ===
Looking Glass, Nightwatch, and TACAMO are US airborne nuclear command posts and represent survivable communication links with US nuclear forces. In the event of significant political-military tensions between the nuclear powers, they would take to the skies and provide survivable communications in the event of enemy attack. They are capable of the full exercise of all available MAOs (Major Attack Options), as well as the full SIOP, in the event of a first strike or the destruction of the NCA. They can directly initiate launch of all American ICBMs via radio and satellite communication, signal SLBMs to launch and send bombers on their strike missions. In addition to those airborne assets, the US government has several command and control bunkers, the most famous of which is that of NORAD, which is tunneled a few thousand feet into the granite of Cheyenne Mountain Complex, outside Colorado Springs, Colorado. It is believed to be able to withstand and to continue to operate after a nuclear direct hit. Other US C^{4}ISTAR bunkers include an installation called Site R, located at Raven Rock, Pennsylvania, which is believed to be the Pentagon's relocation site if Washington, DC, is destroyed, as well as Mount Weather, located in Virginia, which is believed to be the relocation site for top executive branch officials. The Greenbrier, located in West Virginia, was once the site of the Supreme Court of the United States and Congress's relocation bunker, but it is no longer a secret but is now a tourist attraction.

The Russians have a system called SPRN (СПРН), which can detect nuclear launches and providing early warning so that any such strike would not be undetected until it is too late. However, their unique and special capability can be found with their Dead Hand fail-deadly computerized nuclear release system, which is based at Kosvinsky Kamen in the Urals. Apparently, Dead Hand, named for either the dead man's hand in poker or the dead man's switch in dangerous or deadly machinery, can be turned on whenever the Russian leadership fears a nuclear attack. Allegedly, once Dead Hand is activated, if it detects a loss of communications with Moscow as well as nuclear detonations inside Russian territory, it can give final authority for the release of nuclear weapons to military officers in a bunker under Kosvinsky Kamen, who can then, if they so determine, launch Russia's arsenal.

=== Decreasing tensions by mutual adoption of minimum credible deterrent posture ===
Instead of relying on sophisticated communications links and launch-on-warning postures, the French, the British, and the Chinese have chosen to assume different nuclear postures more suited to minimum credible deterrence or the capability to inflict unacceptable losses to prevent the use of nuclear weapons against them, rather than pursuing types of nuclear weapons suitable to first-strike use.

China is believed to pursue a minimum credible deterrent/second strike strategy with regards to the US. That may or may not be true with regards to China's stance with regard to Russia, as few Chinese nuclear platforms are intercontinental, and most of the platforms are deployed on the Russian-Chinese border. Unlike relations of the US and China, Russia and China have had military conflicts in the past. In recent years, China has improved its early warning systems and has renovated certain of its platforms for intercontinental strike, which may or may not be due to the US missile defense system. In general, it appears that China's leaders do not greatly fear a first strike, because of their posture of inflicting unacceptable losses upon an adversary, as opposed to the American and Russian policy of trying to "win" a nuclear war. The Chinese arsenal is considered to suffice in ensuring that such a first strike would not go unavenged.

The United Kingdom and France have sophisticated nuclear weapons platforms, and their nuclear strategies are minimum credible deterrent-based. Both have ballistic missile submarines, armed with intercontinental submarine-launched ballistic missiles, to ensure a second-strike retaliation anywhere in the world. France also has a number of nuclear capable fighter aircraft. Both have nuclear policies that are believed to be effective deterrence towards a would-be nuclear strike against themselves, NATO, European Union members, and other allies.

== Destabilizing role of land-based MIRVed ICBMs ==
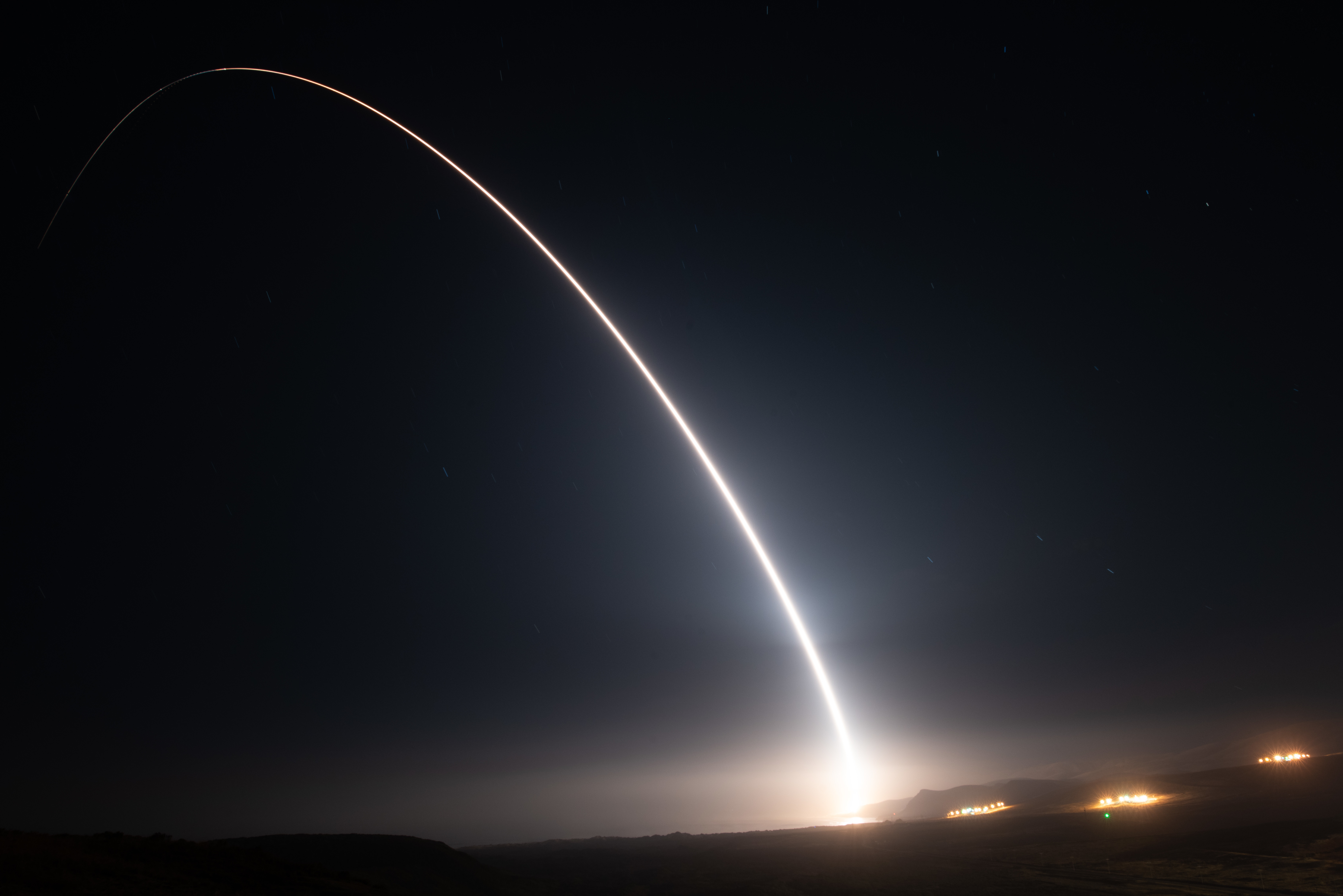
A Minuteman III ICBM test launch from Vandenberg Space Force Base, United States

MIRVed land-based ICBMs are generally considered suitable for a first strike or a counterforce strike, due to:

1. Their high accuracy (small circular error probable), compared to submarine-launched ballistic missiles which used to be less accurate, and more prone to defects;
2. Their fast response time, compared to bombers which are considered too slow;
3. Their ability to carry multiple MIRV warheads at once, useful for destroying a whole missile field with one missile.

Unlike a decapitation strike or a countervalue strike, a counterforce strike might result in a potentially more constrained retaliation. Though the Minuteman III of the mid-1960s was MIRVed with 3 warheads, heavily MIRVed vehicles threatened to upset the balance; these included the SS-18 Satan which was deployed in 1976, and was considered to threaten Minuteman III silos, which led some neoconservatives ("Team B") to conclude a Soviet first strike was being prepared for. This led to the development of the aforementioned Pershing II, the Trident I and Trident II, as well as the MX missile, and the B-1 Lancer.

MIRVed land-based ICBMs are considered destabilizing because they tend to put a premium on striking first. When a missile is MIRVed, it is able to carry multiple warheads (up to 8 in existing U.S. missiles, limited by New START, though Trident II is capable of carrying up to 12) and deliver them to separate targets. If it is assumed that each side has 100 missiles, with 5 warheads each, and further that each side has a 95 percent chance of neutralizing the opponent's missiles in their silos by firing 2 warheads at each silo, then the attacking side can reduce the enemy ICBM force from 100 missiles to about 5 by firing 40 missiles with 200 warheads, and keeping the rest of 60 missiles in reserve. As such, this type of weapon was intended to be banned under the START II agreement, however the START II agreement was never activated, and neither Russia nor the US has adhered to the agreement.

== Destabilizing role of missile defense ==
Any defense system against nuclear missiles such as SDI will be more effective against limited numbers of missiles launched. At small numbers of targets, each defensive asset will be able to take multiple shots at each warhead, and a high kill ratio could be achieved easily. As the number of targets increases, the defensive network becomes "saturated" as each asset must target and destroy more and more warheads in the same window of time. Eventually the system will reach a maximum number of targets destroyed and after this point all additional warheads will penetrate the defenses. This leads to several destabilizing effects.

First, a state that is not building similar defenses may be encouraged to attack before the system is in place, essentially starting the war while there is no clear advantage instead of waiting until they will be at a distinct disadvantage after the defenses are completed. Second, one of the easiest ways to counter any proposed defenses is to simply build more warheads and missiles, reaching that saturation point sooner and hitting targets through a strategy of attrition. Third, and most importantly, since defenses are more effective against small numbers of warheads, a nation with a defense system is actually encouraged to engage in a counterforce first strike. The smaller retaliatory strike is then more easily destroyed by the defense system than a full attack would be. This undermines the doctrine of MAD by discrediting a nation's ability to punish any aggressor with a lethal retaliatory second strike.

== See also ==
- Dead Hand, a Soviet nuclear retaliation system
- Decapitation strike
- Second strike
- Cuban Missile Crisis
- Preemptive war
- Mutual assured destruction
- No first use
- Nuclear terrorism
