= Counterforce =

High amount of military value in nuclear strategy concerning targeting

In nuclear strategy, a counterforce target is one that has military value, such as a launch silo for intercontinental ballistic missiles, an airbase at which nuclear-armed bombers are stationed, a homeport for ballistic missile submarines, or a command and control installation.

The intent of a counterforce strategy (attacking counterforce targets with nuclear weapons) is to conduct a preemptive nuclear strike which has as its aim to disarm an adversary by destroying its nuclear weapons before they can be launched. That would minimize the impact of a retaliatory second strike. However, counterforce attacks are possible in a second strike as well, especially with more survivable submarine-launched weapons like UGM-133 Trident II. A counterforce target is distinguished from a countervalue target, which includes an adversary's population, knowledge, economic, or political resources. In short, a counterforce strike is directed against an adversary's military capabilities, while a countervalue strike is directed against an adversary's civilian-centered institutions.

A closely related tactic is the decapitation strike, which destroys an enemy's nuclear command and control facilities and similarly has a goal to eliminate or reduce the enemy's ability to launch a second strike.

== Theory ==
In nuclear warfare, enemy targets are divided into two types: counterforce and countervalue. A counterforce target is an element of the military infrastructure, usually either specific weapons or the bases that support them. A counterforce strike is an attack that targets those elements but leaving the civilian infrastructure, the countervalue targets, as undamaged as possible. Countervalue refers to the targeting of an opponent's cities and civilian populations.

Counterforce weapons may be seen to provide more credible deterrence in future conflict by providing options for leaders. One option considered by the Soviet Union in the 1970s was basing missiles in orbit.

== Cold War ==
Counterforce is a type of attack which was originally proposed during the Cold War.

Because of the low accuracy (circular error probable) of early generation intercontinental ballistic missiles (and especially submarine-launched ballistic missiles), counterforce strikes were initially possible only against very large, undefended targets like bomber airfields and naval bases. Later-generation missiles, with much-improved accuracy, made possible counterforce attacks against the opponent's hardened military facilities, like missile silos and command and control centers.

Both sides in the Cold War took steps to protect at least some of their nuclear forces from counterforce attacks. At one point, the US kept B-52 Stratofortress bombers permanently in flight so that they would remain operational after any counterforce strike. Other bombers were kept ready for launch on short notice, allowing them to escape their bases before intercontinental ballistic missiles, launched from land, could destroy them. The deployment of nuclear weapons on ballistic missile submarines changed the equation considerably, as submarines launching from positions off the coast would likely destroy airfields before bombers could launch, which would reduce their ability to survive an attack. Submarines themselves, however, are largely immune from counterforce strikes unless they are moored at their naval bases, and both sides fielded many such weapons during the Cold War.

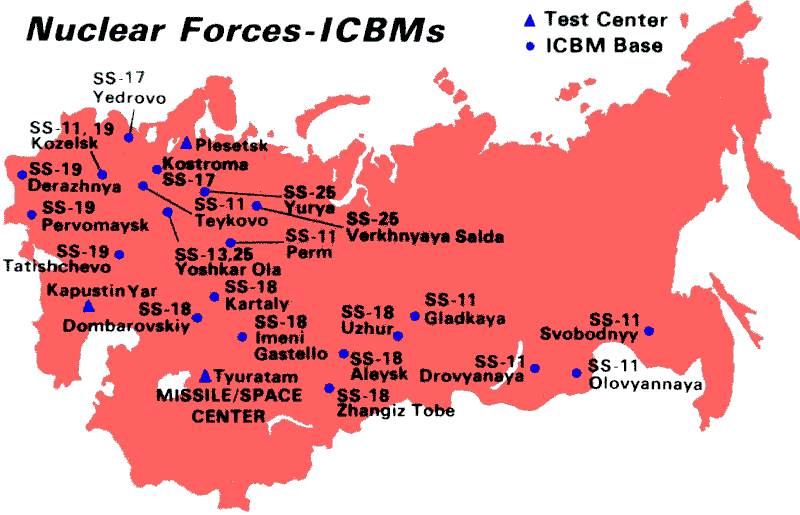
US Department of Defense map of the Soviet Strategic Rocket Forces ICBM silos and bases in the 1980s.

A counterforce exchange was one scenario mooted for a possible limited nuclear war. The concept was that one side might launch a counterforce strike against the other; the victim would recognize the limited nature of the attack and respond in kind. That would leave the military capability of both sides largely destroyed. The war might then come to an end because both sides would recognize that any further action would lead to attacks on the civilian population from the remaining nuclear forces, a countervalue strike.

Critics of that idea claimed that since even a counterforce strike would kill millions of civilians since some strategic military facilities like bomber airbases were often located near large cities. That would make it unlikely that escalation to a full-scale countervalue war could be prevented.

MIRVed land-based ICBMs are considered destabilizing because they tend to put a premium on striking first. For example, suppose that each side has 100 missiles, with five warheads each, and each side has a 95 percent chance of neutralizing the opponent's missiles in their silos by firing two warheads at each silo. In that case, the side that strikes first can reduce the enemy ICBM force from 100 missiles to about five by firing 40 missiles with 200 warheads and keeping the remaining 60 missiles in reserve. For such an attack to be successful, the warheads would have to strike their targets before the enemy launched a counterattack (see second strike and launch on warning). This type of weapon was therefore banned under the START II agreement, which was not ratified and therefore ineffectual.

== Counterforce disarming first-strike weapons ==
- Ababeel. MIRV nuclear capable ballistic missile developed by Pakistan in response to India's development of a Ballistic Missile Defence system.
- R-36M (SS-18 Satan). Deployed in 1976, this counterforce MIRV ICBM had single (20 Mt) or ten MIRV (550-750 kt each) warheads, with a circular error probable (CEP) of 250 m (820 ft). Targeted against Minuteman III silos as well as CONUS command, control, and communications facilities. Has sufficient throw-weight to carry up to 10 RVs and 40 penaids. Still in service.
- RSD-10 (SS-20 Saber). Deployed in 1978, this counterforce MIRV IRBM could hide behind the Urals in Asian Russia, and launch its highly accurate three warhead payload (150 kt each, with a 150 m (490 ft) CEP) against NATO command, control, and communications installations, bunkers, air fields, air defense sites, and nuclear facilities in Europe. Extremely short flight time ensured NATO would be unable to respond prior to weapon impact. Triggered development and deployment of the Pershing II by NATO in 1983.
- Peacekeeper (MX Missile). Deployed in 1986, this missile boasted ten MIRV warheads each with a 300 kt yield, CEP 120 m (390 ft). Decommissioned.
- Pershing II. Deployed in 1983, this single warhead MRBM boasted 50 m CEP with terminal active radar homing/DSMAC guidance. Short, seven-minute flight-time (which makes launch on warning much harder), variable yield warhead of 5-50 kt, and range of 1,800 km (1,100 mi), allowed this weapon to strike command, control, and communications installations, bunkers, air fields, air defense sites, and ICBM silos in the European part of the Soviet Union with scarcely any warning. Decommissioned.
- RT-23 Molodets (SS-24 Scalpel). Deployed in 1987, this MIRV ICBM carried ten warheads, each with 300-550 kt yield and a CEP of 150–250 m (490–820 ft).
- UGM-133 Trident II. Deployed in 1990, this intercontinental-range SLBM carries up to eight RVs with CEP of 80–120 m (260–390 ft) and yield of 100/475 kt. Main purpose is second strike countervalue retaliation, but the excellent CEP and much shorter flight-time due to submarine launch (reducing the possibility of launch on warning) makes it an excellent first-strike weapon. However, that any nuclear power would be willing to place its nuclear submarines close to enemy shores during times of strategic tension is highly questionable. Has sufficient throw-weight to deploy up to twelve warheads, but the post-boost vehicle is only capable of deploying eight, and on average about four are deployed in current practice.

== See also ==
- Balance of power (international relations)
- Balance of terror
- Deterrence theory
- Limited first strike
- Peace through strength
