= Chinese biological weapons program =

Military program of the People's Republic of China

The People's Republic of China (PRC) was reported to have operated a biological weapons program during the Cold War. The United States Department of State stated that two facilities in Beijing and Lingbao City, from the 1950s to 1987, weaponized large quantities of ricin, botulinum toxin, anthrax, plague, cholera, and tularemia. Some security analysts believe the program remains covertly active, and involves dual-use technology. The PRC ratified the Biological Weapons Convention (BWC) and Chinese officials have claimed that the country has never engaged in biological activities with offensive military applications. Members of the US intelligence community strongly suspect that the PRC has, as of 2015, at least 42 facilities that may be involved in research, development, production, or testing of biological agents.

Most biological weapons experts believe that currently China can produce a wide range of biological threat agents and sophisticated delivery systems on very short notice. Many life science researchers in Chinese academia and industry serve as People's Liberation Army (PLA) officers, and the latest 2020 revision of The Science of Military Strategy, a cornerstone doctrinal text for PLA officers, states that China anticipates that biotechnology, including biological weapons, will dominate the modern battlefield.

Senior PLA officials have expressed a distinct interest in ethnic bioweapons, agents which can be targeted at a particular genetic makeup. In 2017, former president of PLA National Defense University (PLA NDU), General Zhang Shibo, suggested that “biotechnology is gradually showing strong signs characteristic of an offensive capability, including the possibility that specific ethnic genetic attacks could be employed." In 2020, another professor at PLA NDU spoke of the "huge war effectiveness" of a "targeted attack that destroys a race, or a specific group of people." Some believe this interest is borne partly of concern for the vulnerabilities inherent in the monoethnicity of China's population, which is 91 percent Han Chinese. Others believe the PLA's interest extends to offensive capabilities.

== History ==
=== Cold War ===
In 1952, the People's Republic of China succeeded to the Republic of China's ratification of the Geneva Protocol, which is interpreted as a ban on the use of chemical and biological weapons.

During the Cultural Revolution, citizens wrote letters to the Zhongnanhai residence of government leaders, warning of attacks on facilities that stored pathogenic bacteria, poisonous plant samples, toxicants, and other dangerous substances.

==== Biological Weapons Convention ratification ====
On 15 November 1984, twelve years after the treaty opened for signature, the People's Republic of China ratified the Biological Weapons Convention (BWC). In an addendum, it noted the BWC's lack of explicit prohibition on use, or effective inspections and sanctions, and pushed for an equivalent chemical weapons convention. A 1996 review conference affirmed that the BWC is interpreted to have a prohibition on use.

==== Accidents ====
Ken Alibek, former director of Biopreparat, the Soviet Union's largest biological warfare program, said that China suffered a serious accident at one of its biological weapons plants in the late 1980s. Alibek claimed that Soviet reconnaissance satellites had identified a biological weapons laboratory and plant near a site for testing nuclear warheads in western China. The Soviets suspected that two separate epidemics of hemorrhagic fever that swept the region in the late 1980s were caused by an accident in a lab where Chinese scientists were weaponizing viral diseases.

=== Post-Cold War ===
Proliferation scholars point to the 1993 Yinhe incident as a formative event for counterproliferation of weapons of mass destruction in the context of China–United States relations.

In the 1990s, U.S. officials, such as Secretary of State Madeleine Albright, expressed concerns over possible Chinese biological weapon transfers to Iran and other nations. Albright stated that she had received reports regarding transfers of dual-use items from Chinese entities to the Iranian government which concerned her and that the United States had to encourage China to adopt comprehensive export controls to prevent assistance to Iran's alleged biological weapons program. The United States acted upon the allegations on January 16, 2002, when it imposed sanctions on three Chinese firms accused of supplying Iran with materials used in the manufacture of chemical and biological weapons. In response to this, China issued export control protocols on dual use biological technology in late 2002.

A large-scale Chinese state-run biological weapons program was reported to exist as recently as 2015, based on analysis from former IDF military intelligence officer Dany Shoham, integrating the findings of several different countries' defense agencies. The program reportedly includes at least 42 facilities that are involved in research, development, production, or testing of biological weapons (30 associated with the People's Liberation Army and 12 associated with the Chinese defense ministry). US intelligence agencies assumed as early as 1993 that the PRC has maintained an operational, secretive, and sizable bioweapons arsenal that is "extremely hidden" but continuously upgraded.

The official position of the United States Department of State, as published in a 2021 report, is that China likely operated an offensive bioweapons program before the 1984 signing of the BWC treaty, and continued to operate the program afterwards. The report also expresses concern that China may have transferred controlled biological weapons-related items to nations of international concern (e.g. Iran, similar to the Yinhe incident).

In 2017, a textbook published by the People's Liberation Army National Defence University called the Science of Military Strategy debuted the potential for biological warfare to include "specific ethnic genetic attacks." The same year, former People's Liberation Army general Zhang Shibo authored a book that concluded that "modern biotechnology development is gradually showing strong signs characteristic of an offensive capability," including "specific ethnic genetic attacks" (特定种族基因攻击). In 2020, a professor at the same PLA university spoke of the "huge war effectiveness" of a "targeted attack that destroys a race, or a specific group of people." A 2021 study by the James Martin Center for Nonproliferation Studies stated that the Chinese government's interest in biological weapons is driven by a recognition of its own vulnerability to genetic targeting due to a broadly homogenous population with more than 90 percent being ethnic Han Chinese.

According to the 2023 China Military Power Report issued by the US Department of Defense: "the PRC continues to engage in biological activities with dual-use applications, which raise concerns regarding its compliance with the Biological Weapons Convention (BWC). This includes studies at PRC military medical institutions on potent toxins with dual-use applications. The PRC likely possesses capabilities relevant to chemical and biological warfare that pose a threat to U.S., Allied, and partner forces, military operations, and civilian populations."

In April 2024, a United States Department of State report stated that the PLA has conducted research into dual-use marine toxins that call into question China's BWC compliance. In April 2025, an update report stated that China has incorporated artificial intelligence into its bio-weapons programs.

In 2025, the Federal Bureau of Investigation (FBI) arrested a Chinese scientist, Yunqing Jian, for smuggling Fusarium graminearum from the PRC into the U.S. Jian pled guilty to smuggling biological materials and served five months in prison.

== See also ==
- China and weapons of mass destruction
- Ethnic bioweapon
