= National Command Authority (United States) =

American ultimate source of military orders

The National Command Authority (NCA) is a term that was formerly used by the Department of Defense of the United States to refer to the ultimate source of lawful military orders.

The NCA was first alluded to in a 1960 Department of Defense document. It included at least the president of the United States as commander-in-chief and the secretary of defense. The term has no statutory or constitutional basis and was replaced in 2002 in favor of explicitly referring to the president and/or the secretary of defense.

The term also refers to communications with the commanding officers of the unified combatant commands to put U.S. forces into action.

== Authorization of a nuclear or strategic attack ==
Only the president can direct the use of nuclear weapons by U.S. Armed Forces, through plans such as OPLAN 8010–12. The president has unilateral authority as commander-in-chief to order that nuclear weapons be used for any reason at any time.

== See also ==
- Designated survivor
- Goldwater–Nichols Act
- Pre-delegation authority
- United States Strategic Command
