= JL-1 (air-launched ballistic missile) =

Chinese nuclear-capable air-launched ballistic missile

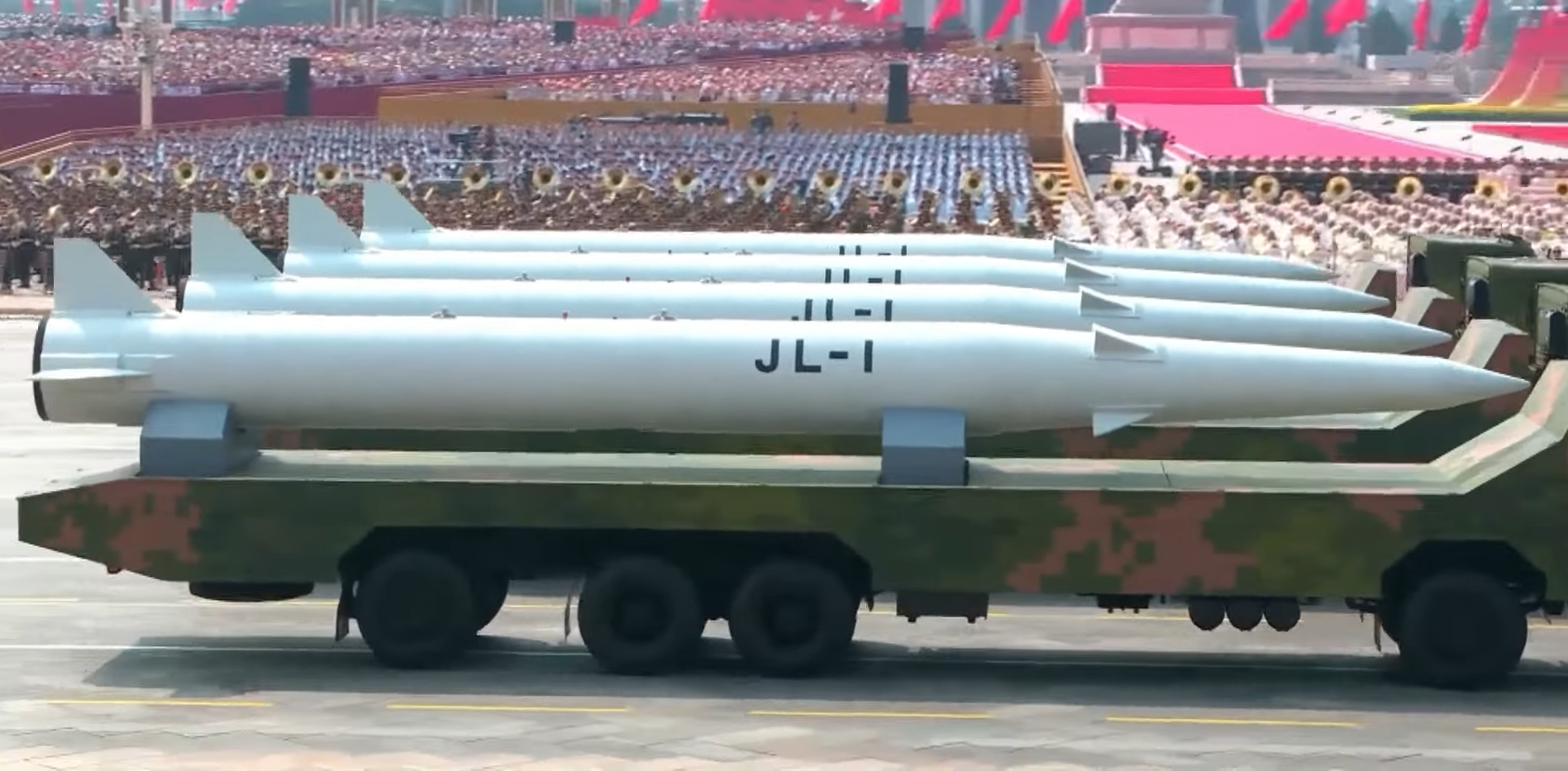
JL-1 air-launched ballistic missile

The JL-1 (Chinese: 惊雷-1; pinyin: Jīng Léi-Yī; lit. 'thunderclap-1') is a Chinese nuclear-capable air-launched ballistic missile (ALBM).

== History ==
The JL-1 was in development by 2018, and the United States projected it would be ready for deployment by 2025. The missile was first unveiled at the 2025 China Victory Day Parade.

== Design ==
Analysts believed the JL-1 is an air-launched missile variant of the DF-21 medium-range ballistic missile, previously known as the KF-21 or by its NATO designation: CH-AS-X-13.

The KF-21 was reportedly to serve a nuclear strike or anti-ship role, and is a two-stage missile with a range of 3,000 km (1,900 mi).

The JL-1 is designed to be carried by the People's Liberation Army Air Force's Xi'an H-6N strategic bombers and launched as a standoff weapon, forming part of China's nuclear triad.. During its official reveal, the missile was reported to have a range of 8,000 km (5,000 mi), which is significantly longer than both DF-21 and DF-26, making it an intercontinental ballistic missile.

The missile's longer range may have benefited from the speed of its launch aircraft, thus having a much greater range than its ground-launched counterparts.

Weight reduction may have been achieved by using composite materials. The War Zone reported two possible warhead configurations; a DF-21D-style "double-cone" tip, and a hypersonic glide vehicle (HGV) similar to the DF-ZF on the DF-17 missile.

== See also ==
- YJ-21
