= Singapore and weapons of mass destruction =

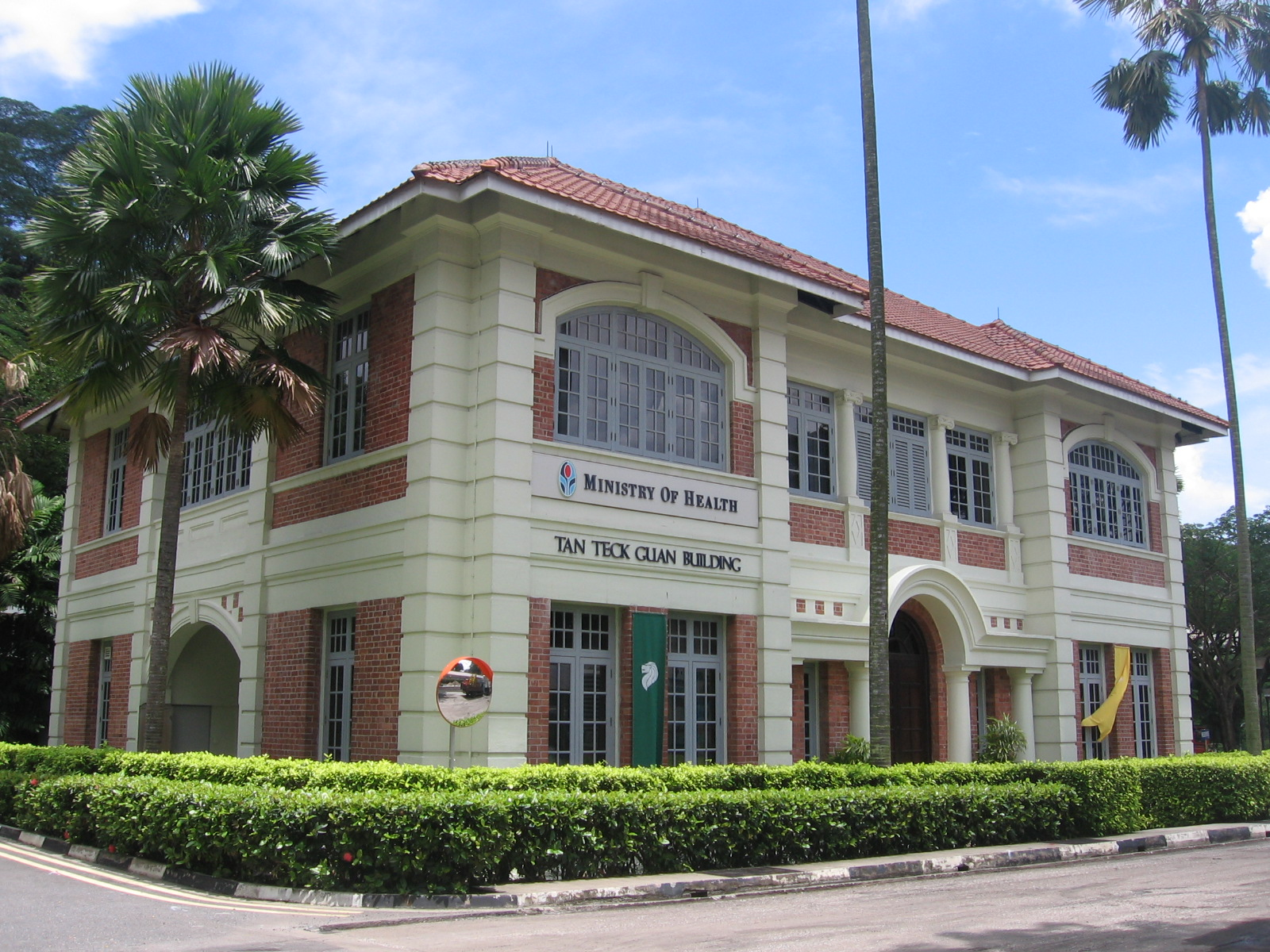
The Tan Teck Guan Building, formerly a plague laboratory for biological weapons research of the Imperial Japanese Army.

From 1962 until 1971, British nuclear weapons were stored in Singapore, for delivery by aircraft at RAF Tengah, and via the frequent transiting of aircraft carriers carrying nuclear weapons and delivery aircraft. This period included the British Colony of Singapore until 1963, Malaysian Singapore, and the post-1965 Proclamation of Singapore as an independent state.

The UK was a member of the anti-communist Southeast Asia Treaty Organization, which aimed to contain the communist government of China, as part of the broader Cold War in Asia. The weapons supported power projection under the UK's East of Suez policy, as a theoretical deterrent against a China-SEATO war, and as a counterbalance to United States influence in Southeast Asia.

During World War II, Singapore was a headquarters of Imperial Japanese Army experimentation with biological weapons, under the Unit 9420 division of Unit 731.

Singapore is a signatory to the Chemical Weapons Convention, Biological Weapons Convention, Treaty on the Non-Proliferation of Nuclear Weapons, and since 1995 the Southeast Asian Nuclear-Weapon-Free Zone Treaty.

== Nuclear weapons ==
From 1962 until at the latest 1970, British nuclear weapons were stored in Singapore, for delivery by aircraft at RAF Tengah, and via the frequent transiting of aircraft carriers carrying nuclear weapons and delivery aircraft. The Proclamation of Singapore as an independent state was made in 1965, after Singapore was expelled from Malaysia.

=== Political background ===
Policy-makers saw Britain’s nuclear force as an important contribution not only to NATO, but also to the South East Asia Treaty Organization (SEATO), created in 1954, as an analogue to contain and make military plans for a large-scale conflict with the communist People's Republic of China. In 1956 a report to the Chiefs of Staff Committee concluded that nuclear weapons would have to be used if war broke out between SEATO and China. The aerial nuclear bombing campaigns would have been concentrated on airbases and other targets throughout North Vietnam and the south of China.

While the weapons had a military justification in the prospect of a limited nuclear war between SEATO and China, they also served a political purpose. Prime Minister Harold Macmillan hoped by contributing to SEATO's nuclear forces, the UK could influence over US nuclear policy in Southeast Asia. The two countries had historically been at odds over the region, and many post-war British prime ministers, were alarmed by aggressive US posturing in Korea, Taiwan, and Indochina.

=== Aircraft weapons ===
In 1957 non-nuclear armed V-bombers began to make familiarization flights to the Far East. By 1960 the RAF was involved in drawing up nuclear targeting plans for SEATO.

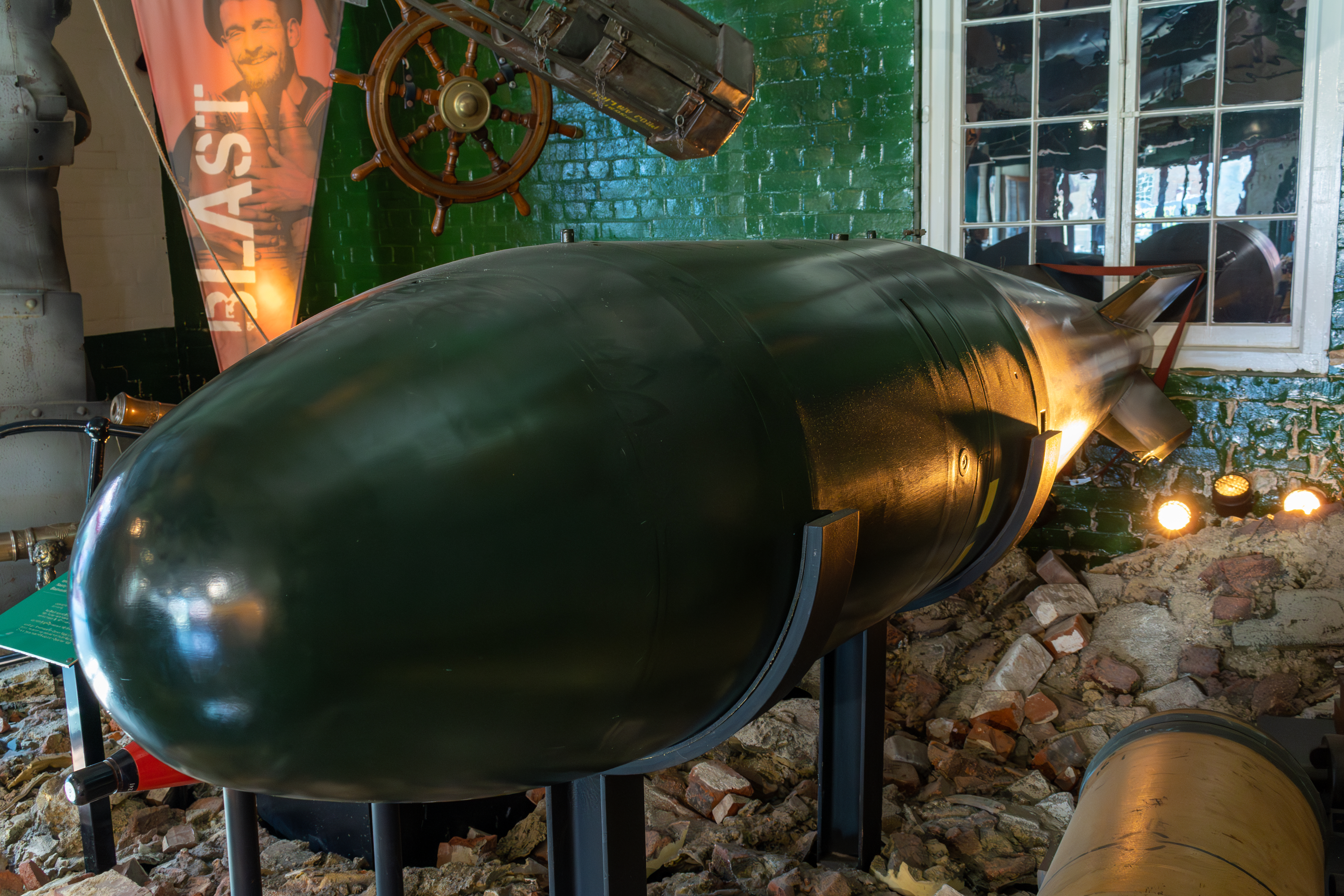
Red Beard training nuclear bomb at Explosion Museum

In 1958 it was decided to construct a permanent storage facility for nuclear weapons at Tengah. In 1962 the UK had plans to move 48 Red Beard tactical nuclear weapons to Tengah. Three squadrons of V-bombers would be based there, capable of dropping Red Beard weapons from high altitude, together with one squadron of smaller English Electric Canberra aircraft, which would use a low-altitude bombing system, or toss bombing tactic.

On 17 August 1962, Macmillan authorized the RAF to deploy both live and dummy weapons to Tengah. Orders were for the live weapons to remain in their special storage area, but in November 1963 permission was granted to train with dummy weapons in the open. The Canberra squadron at Tengah practiced low-altitude nuclear bombing from 1963. Some of the targets assigned to the Canberras, in a SEATO–China war scenario were in the neutral country of Burma, anticipating a land advance by the People's Liberation Army.

V-bombers were dispatched to RAF Tengah, and RAF Butterworth in Malaysia, during the 1963–1966 Indonesia–Malaysia confrontation, tasked with conventional bombing of Indonesian airfields, but this mission was never flown. Throughout the 1960s V-bombers were also sent to the Far East on SEATO nuclear reinforcement exercises, but the plan for their permanent basing was never fulfilled. The Foreign and Commonwealth Office Migrated Archives include a note that the United States cautioned Britain against a tactical nuclear strike in Sumatra.

This squadron remained in the Far East until 1970, but it is not clear how long it remained armed with nuclear weapons. The RAF closed Tengah Air Base in 1971, and it was later handed over to the Singapore Air Defence Command.

=== Naval weapons ===
Additionally, as part of the SEATO commitment, between 1960 and 1970 the British aircraft carriers Victorious and Hermes were deployed to the East of Suez region including Singapore. These ships carried Red Beard nuclear weapons, for delivery by Supermarine Scimitar fighter-bombers, although the fissile pits were stored separately from the implosion weapons. In 1970, the Navy replaced its Red Beards with WE.177 bombs, also useable as depth charges, although it is unclear if these were deployed to Singapore. Plans were also made during the late 1960s to base British Polaris submarines east of Suez, but this never took place.

The Royal Navy withdrew from Singapore in 1971.

=== Post-stationing ===
Singapore signed the Treaty on the Non-Proliferation of Nuclear Weapons in 1970 and ratified it in 1976.

Singapore is a member of the 1995 Southeast Asian Nuclear-Weapon-Free Zone Treaty.

Singapore signed the Comprehensive Nuclear-Test-Ban Treaty in 1999 and ratified it in 2001.

== Chemical weapons ==
Singapore signed the Chemical Weapons Convention in 1993 and ratified it in 1997.

== Biological weapons ==
The headquarters of Unit 9420 was established at King Edward VII College of Medicine, with six laboratories inside. The Tan Teck Guan Building served as a laboratory for glanders. The laboratories in Outram were used to cultivate fleas from rats.

According to the research findings of Unit 731, the optimal climatic conditions for breeding fleas were a temperature of 22 degree Celsius and 76% humidity, which was consistent with the climate in Southeast Asia. In 1943, the Japanese military transported over 30,000 rats from Tokyo to Malaya. In October 1944, another 30,000 rats were transported from Tokyo to Singapore. Additionally, the Japanese military used animal specimens from the Raffles Museum for research, considering hamsters, squirrels, and guinea pigs as supplements to rats.

For every ten thousand rats, ten kilograms of fleas could be produced. Malaya Peninsula thus became the largest flea farm for the Japanese military outside of Japan and China. Researchers fed captured rats, injected them with Yersinia pestis, causing the rats to become sick. The fleas then fed on the dead hosts, and researchers separated them from the host's body, fed them blood, and every three to four months, they sent the fleas in glass bottles to Thailand.

In addition to the plague, laboratories in Outram, Singapore also researched cholera, malaria, smallpox, typhoid fever, dysentery, and anthrax. Singapore historian Lim Shao Bin estimated that Unit 9420 may have also conducted human experiments and is currently under investigation.

Singapore signed the Biological Weapons Convention in 1972 and ratified it in 1975.

== See also ==
- Nuclear sharing
- Nuclear weapons of the United Kingdom
- China and weapons of mass destruction
- Unit 9420
- Unit 731
