= The Concept of Active Defence in China's Military Strategy =

Academic book about military strategy in China

- Author: Amrita Jash
- Language: English
- Subject: Military
- Genre: Nonfiction
- Published: July 2021
- Publisher: Pentagon Press
- Publication place: India
- Media type: Hardcover
- Pages: 320
- ISBN: 978-93-90095-30-8
- OCLC: 1260166729

The Concept of Active Defence in China's Military Strategy is a book authored by Amrita Jash, an assistant professor in the Department of Geopolitics and International Relations at Manipal Academy of Higher Education. The book describes the core national interests of China along with its strategic intentions and military capabilities. It describes 'The Science of Military Strategy' (SMS), one of the main doctrinal military publications of the People's Liberation Army (PLA) of China on the study of war, and the directions of the current Chinese military strategy.

The book was released by N. N. Vohra, the former Governor of Jammu & Kashmir.

== Background ==
The book is authored by Amrita Jash in 2021, after the events of the 2017 China–India border standoff and the 2020–2021 China–India skirmishes.

== Content ==
The book attempts to explain the Chinese military strategy. According to reviewer Manoj Joshi, its strategy of "active defence" when unravelled turns out to be "active offence". Joshi says that in a way, this is a deliberately chosen deceptive strategy to camouflage offensive action.

== Reception ==
Writing for The Wire, Manoj Joshi in his review suggests that the book "seeks to unravel ‘the riddle, wrapped in a mystery inside an enigma” of Chinese military strategy’ and strongly recommends that the book "should be [a] compulsory reading in our [India's] military institutions."

Indian Navy's Captain Gurpreet S. Khurana in his review for the Manohar Parrikar Institute for Defence Studies and Analyses's Journal of Defence Studies, suggests that the book "attempts to answer some key questions of immense relevance today about China as a neighbour, as well as China as a major global power. [...] as the author says, ‘What entails China's rise?.’"

In a review for The Financial Express, Lieutenant General Podali Shankar Rajeshwar writes, "What makes the book interesting is Dr Jash’s explanation of China’s paradoxical but increasing insecurities vis-à-vis India, that give rise to its aggressive behaviour and new claims."

In 2023, Suyash Desai of National Taiwan Normal University reviewed the book for China Report.

== See also ==
- Active defense
