= The Science of Military Strategy =

Publication of China's military

The Science of Military Strategy (SMS; 战略学; Zhanlüe Xue) is one of the main doctrinal publications of the China's People's Liberation Army (PLA) on the study of war. It is compiled and edited by the PLA Academy of Military Science (AMS). Four editions have been published so far – 1987, 2001, 2013 and 2020. The 2013 edition is a joint work of 35 Chinese military scholars led by Major General Shou Xiaosong (寿晓松). The PLA defines the "science of strategy" as "the discipline of studying the overall situation and rules of war, national defense, and army building".

Taylor Fravel explains that while The Science of Military Strategy is not an official policy, strategy or doctrine of China, it is a collective effort by numerous notable military strategists in the PLA Academy of Military Science, therefore it is an important starting point for examining Chinese military strategy. Further, the AMS SMS play a part in the formation of PLA's operational roles. The PLA National Defense University (NDU) also has a publication called The Science of Military Strategy. Editions include – 1999, 2015 and 2017. The NDU editions are notable because they are edited by senior most leadership. Both the academy's and the university's editions are used in graduate courses. Updates of the book lag the publication of new strategic guidelines by many years.

== 2001 ==
The 2001 edition is 40% longer than the 2013 edition. The 2001 edition attempted to cover as many dimensions of warfare as possible. Chapters in the 2001 edition included "strategic decision-making, war preparations, war control, strategic deterrence, principles for strategic actions, strategic offense, strategic defense, strategic maneuver, strategic air raids and counter-air raids, strategic information operations, and strategic support". Newer topics in the 2013 edition such as space and cyber strategy are not covered in the 2001 edition The English version of the 2001 edition was purposely revealed to an overseas audience 2005 onwards.

== 2013 ==
The 2013 edition is an evolution in thinking, and not a revolution, as compared to the 2001 edition. Traditional approaches and concepts such as "active defense" are adapted to current situations. Concepts which were only briefly mentioned or overlooked in the 2001 edition are further elaborated in the 2013 edition such as "forward defense" and "strategic space", concepts linked to expanding the battlespace and attaining greater strategic depth. Further, there is a change in the definition of "military strategy" itself between the first between the 2001 and 2013, with the 2013 definition being broader. The 2013 edition outlines large-scale conflict, conflicts over disputed territories, instability in bordering nations and actions such as sea-lane patrolling. The 2013 edition also challenges traditional thinking, such as the dominance of the ground force.

The 12 chapters cover strategy, China's strategic environment and historic military mission, the development of contemporary wars and the characteristics of war that the PLA may face, international order that China faces, strategic guidance for local wars, military deterrence, non-war military operations, military struggles in the nuclear area, space and cyberspace, building a modern military and specific strategies that PLA could employ in different fields.

China's places itself in an international order that is multipolar, with PLA's historic mission being closely linked to China's worldview, the survival of the CPC over everything else, and the winning of local and limited area wars under conditions of informatization. The purpose of local wars stem from "limited political goals, limited military goals, and limited economic goals". A key requirement is the ability to control these local wars from spiraling out of control; as this will impede upon China's peaceful rise. In this aspect, deterrence is key. Deterrence and showcasing the credibility of deterrence therefore becomes a political-military concept. Attacking from far is a requirement for self-preservation. Utilization of information networks provides long range striking capabilities while an information based attack multiplies the lethalness of an artillery strike. PLA admits that it is conventionally handicapped, therefore it must focus on unconventional means of war including information supremacy in the space and cyberspace domain. A key goal is to identify areas in which it does not fall to far behind the leaders, and give those areas more focus.

In a review of the book, Mingda Qiu says that the "book still has not provided detailed analysis of the efficiency of different methods of deterrence" and that the "theoretical construction is also not well completed to provide in-depth understanding aside from merely description."

== Editions ==
- Military Strategy Research Department, China Academy of Military Science (2013) The science of military strategy. Beijing: Military Science Press
- Peng Guangqian and Yao Youzhi's (eds.) (2005) The Science of Military Strategy 2001. Translated and published by Military Science Publishing House

== See also ==
- Peng Guangqian
- The Concept of Active Defence in China's Military Strategy
