= Pre-delegation authority =

Aspect of nuclear command and control

Pre-delegation authority is the practice by United States presidents to empower military commanders to initiate nuclear attacks in various circumstances. This authority is typically kept classified, so the American public has always been told that the president has the sole and exclusive authority to start nuclear war. It is not publicly known to what extent, if at all, the current U.S. president has pre-delegated their nuclear authority.

The practice began in the 1950s under President Dwight D. Eisenhower and would continue through at least the administration of Jimmy Carter. It was only officially revealed to the public in 1998 when his instructions enacting the practice were declassified. Similar practices exist in other nuclear states, such as the Soviet Union and now Russia's Dead Hand system.

== Rationale ==
In his 2017 book, The Doomsday Machine, Daniel Ellsberg described "the most compelling and legitimate purpose" of pre-delegation authority to be "to assure that the Soviets (or now, Russians) could not paralyze our retaliatory forces by a 'decapitating' attack on Washington, D.C., or by attacking the president wherever he might be."

While the United States has a formal line of succession to the president, given that many of them would also be in Washington D.C., it is possible that many of them would also die in a decapitating attack, leaving it unclear who the new president was. In 1981, Brent Scowcroft pointed out that aside from the Secretaries of Defense and State, the potential successors were "almost completely unacquainted" with nuclear command and control. Having pre-delegated to explicit people would allow for them to be specially protected and given nuclear codes and plans ahead of time.

Academic Peter Feaver testified to Congress in 2017 that pre-delegation authority "may thwart an enemy's first-strike planning, for example, but, it would raise the risk that a weapon might be used in an unauthorized fashion or by someone confused in the fog of battle."

== History ==
In the 1940s under President Truman, the "United States Policy on Atomic Warfare" (NSC 30) concluded that, "The decision as to the employment of atomic weapons in the event of war is to be made by the Chief Executive when he considers such decision to be required." That policy would be overruled in 1956 by a new "Basic National Security Policy" (NSC 5602/1), which introduced the idea of pre-delegation authority. It stated, "Nuclear weapons will be used in general war and in military operations short of general war as authorized by the President. Such authorization as may be given in advance will be determined by the President."

=== Eisenhower's instructions ===
President Eisenhower issued secret pre-delegation instructions in 1957 in a memo titled "Authorization for the Expenditure of Nuclear Weapons", which allowed some commanders to use nuclear weapons in specific circumstances if he could not be reached. For example, this meant Admiral Harry D. Felt, commander in chief of Pacific Command (CINCPAC), had such authority for some part of every day as communications were regularly out between CINCPAC headquarters in Hawaii and Washington, D.C. Felt further delegated this authority to the next level of command (typically a two-star rank) under similar conditions, which included ships and bases in the West Pacific that also regularly had communications outages with Hawaii.

The instructions were drafted by the Defense and State Departments, but based on declassified memos, the National Security Archive described Eisenhower as playing a "central role in the review process" to avoid "reckless or accidental use of nuclear weapons". After taking office, President Kennedy declined to override Eisenhower's instructions, leaving them in place during the Cuban Missile Crisis. In 1964, President Johnson approved redrafted instructions that were "basically the same as those approved by President Eisenhower".

=== Johnson's modifications ===
Starting in 1965, authority was delegated to the North American Air Defense Command (NORAD) "only under severe restrictions and specific conditions of attack". In 1976 Congressional testimony, retired Vice Admiral Gerald E. Miller explained the rationale for this delegation:

Because of the aspects of our early nuclear capabilities and our great concern for the Soviet capabilities, we built warning systems, which have already been mentioned, such as [the Ballistic Missile Early Warning System]. We were concerned about our ability to respond. We did not have as good warning systems then as good as we have now. There was concern about being able to respond rapidly enough, and the authority was delegated.

In October 1968, Johnson approved changes to a plan known as "Furtherance", which had previously authorized automatic full nuclear attacks against both the Soviet Union and China in the event an attack left the president dead or unavailable, regardless of whether the attack used conventional weapons or who it was perpetrated by. The new plan directed commanders to "avoid a nuclear holocaust" in favor of a "limited response against the appropriate country".

=== Roll back by Clinton ===
Nuclear security expert Bruce G. Blair said that around 1993, President Clinton and his defense secretary, William J. Perry, "quietly rolled back pre-delegation ... although they did not retrieve and consolidate the distributed codes in military custody". By 1998, sources quoted at that time by The Washington Post reported "some elements" of pre-delegation still existed, without specifying which elements. By 2016, a U.S. Department of State report made explicit the prohibition on pre-delegation, while noting a potential exception: "The ability to direct the use of nuclear weapons is limited to the highest authorities in the state. Thus, there is no pre-delegation of release authority. ... Arrangements for how to act when senior political leadership cannot be reached might be an exception."

== Transparency and oversight ==
Specific details about pre-delegation authority are largely kept classified, though the public occasionally received hints about pre-delegation. When asked about the topic in 1985 by The New Yorker, Assistant Defense Secretary Donald Latham said, "There are contingency plans. I just really can't discuss them," while Desmond Ball described pre-delegation authority as "one of the most closely kept secrets." Ellsberg however considered it paradoxical that it was kept so secret, explaining that it is more important for deterrence that the enemy knows about pre-delegation so they would believed that a decapitating attack would fail.

Since the end of the Cold War, some of those policies have been made public. Following Freedom of Information Act requests from the National Security Archive, the government partially declassified some memos from the Eisenhower and Johnson administrations in 1998, officially confirming pre-delegation authority publicly for the first time. More documents were released in 2001.

Congress has also conducted public oversight hearings on the topic. In March 1976, the then-House International Relations Committee conducted a hearing titled "First Use of Nuclear Weapons: Preserving Responsible Control" in which Miller testified about pre-delegation to NORAD. Miller also testified that he was "unable to confirm the allegations" that Eisenhower had pre-delegated his authority, stating that he had "serious doubt that such delegations were made".

Forty years later in 2017, the Senate Foreign Relations Committee held a hearing following President Trump's threats to use nuclear weapons.

== China ==
China's nuclear command and control requires the agreement of both the CCP's Politburo and Central Military Commission for alerting and use of weapons. As a contingency if communications are disrupted, arrangements exist for teams dispatched from central command to personally deliver launch orders. Academic Fiona Cunningham writes that because such arrangements are difficult to replicate for sea-based nuclear deterrents, the possibility for pre-delegation of nuclear launch authority "cannot be ruled out" and if such arrangements exist, "they are likely to be one of the most closely held secrets of China's nuclear posture."

== See also ==
- Nuclear command and control
- Civilian control of the military
