= DF-17 =

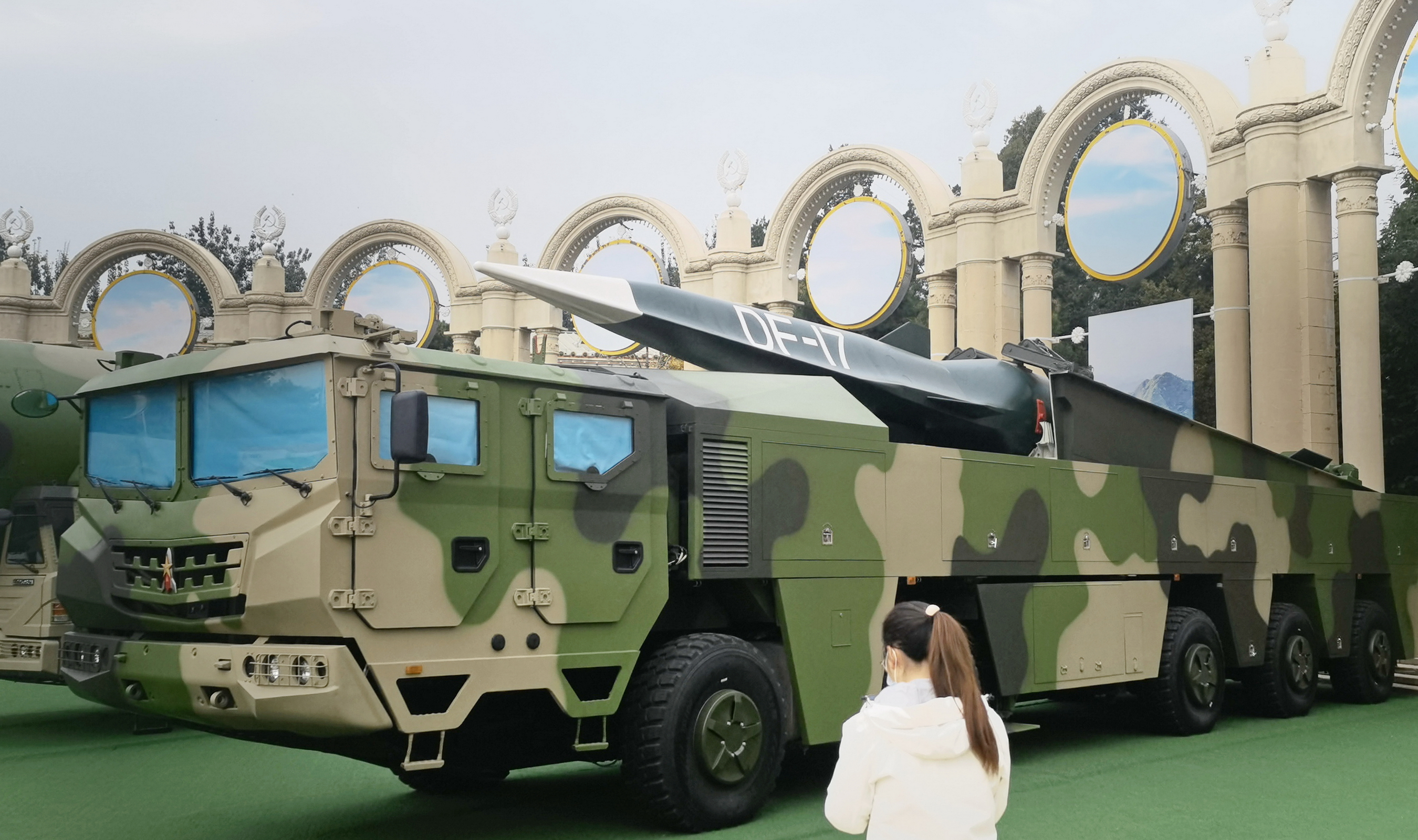
- DF-17 missile on a road-mobile vehicle
- Type: MRBM with HGV
- Place of origin: China

Service history
- In service: 2019–present
- Used by: People's Liberation Army Rocket Force

Production history
- Manufacturer: China Academy of Launch Vehicle Technology (CALT)

Specifications
- Mass: 15,000 kilograms (33,000 lb)
- Length: 11 metres (36 ft)
- Warhead: Thermonuclear (claimed by the United States) or Conventional
- Engine: Single-stage solid-fuel rocket
- Operational range: 1600-2500 km
- Launch platform: Road-mobile Transporter erector launcher

The Dongfeng-17 (simplified Chinese: 东风-17; traditional Chinese: 東風-17; pinyin: dōngfēng-17; lit. 'East Wind-17'; NATO reporting name: CH-SS-22) is a Chinese solid-fuelled road-mobile medium-range ballistic missile designed to carry the DF-ZF hypersonic glide vehicle (HGV).

== Design ==
The DF-17 uses the rocket booster from the DF-16B short-range ballistic missile.

It is more difficult for missile defenses to intercept the manoeuvrable DF-ZF than a ballistic missile, whose trajectories are more predictable. DF-17 strikes to degrade air and missile defenses may precede the use of less survivable weapons.

The missile is equipped with a hypersonic glide vehicle, which allows it to skip along the earth's atmosphere, allowing it to go undetected by radar for longer distances than a ballistic missile covering the same distance. According to a December 2025 article in the Wall Street Journal, military experts believe the missile would be likely deployed against US military targets in Okinawa, in the event that the Chinese military chose to strike them ahead of an invasion of Taiwan.

According to Chinese commentators, the DF-ZF is armed with a conventional warhead. US intelligence considers the DF-ZF to be nuclear capable as well.

== Development ==
The DF-ZF flight test on 15 November 2017 was launched using a DF-17.

The DF-17 and DF-ZF made their first official public appearance during the National Day military parade on 1 October 2019.

A 2020 study by the U.S. Air Force said the missile was believed to be the first HGV-equipped tactical ballistic missile in operational deployment.

== Strategic implications ==
In March 2020, the United States Department of Defense proposed accelerating the development of conventionally armed hypersonic glide vehicles (HGV) to keep pace with the Chinese development. Michael Griffin, former Under Secretary of Defense for Research and Engineering, told the House Armed Services Committee that the United States needs to develop hypersonic weapons "to allow us to match what our adversaries are doing."

=== Further development ===
In 2020, multiple military observers in China reported an air-launched hypersonic missile version based on DF-17 was undergoing testing.

== See also ==
- Avangard – Russia's ground-based hypersonic glide vehicle
- LRAShM – India's shore-based hypersonic anti-ship missile
- Long-Range Hypersonic Weapon – US planned hypersonic glide vehicle

== Sources ==
- Mihal, Christopher J. (July–August 2021). "Understanding the People's Liberation Army Rocket Force". Military Review. 101 (4): 16–30.
- Nouwen, Veerle; Wright, Timothy; Graham, Euan; Herzinger, Blake (January 2024). Long-range Strike Capabilities in the Asia-Pacific: Implications for Regional Stability (Report). The International Institute for Strategic Studies.
- Wood, Peter; Cliff, Roger (2020). A Case Study of the PRC's Hypersonic Systems Development. China Aerospace Studies Institute. ISBN 9798672412085.
