= Nuclear weapons resurgence =

Return of nuclear weapons risk in global security

Nuclear resurgence refers to the re-emergence of nuclear weapons as a central issue in international security debates since the 2020s. Secretary-General of the United Nations António Guterres warned that the risk of nuclear weapon use "has reached heights not seen since the Cold War". After decades of relative nuclear stability following the Cold War, recent geopolitical tensions, weakened arms control mechanisms, and strategic re-calibrations by nuclear powers have brought nuclear issues back to international relations discussions. Reports suggests that nuclear armed states are modernizing and expanding their arsenals. For example, the Stockholm International Peace Research Institute reports a "dangerous new nuclear arms race" amid weakening arms control regimes. Total number of nuclear weapons remain around 12,000 warheads (about 12,321 by the beginning of 2026), with roughly 3,900 deployed on missiles and bombers. About 2,100 warheads are kept on high operational alert, ready to be fired within minutes.

== Factors ==
=== Arsenal modernization ===
All major nuclear powers are upgrading weapons and delivery systems. For example, China's stockpile grew from about 410 to 500 warheads between 2023 and 2024, and India is believed to have expanded its arsenal again in 2024 while developing new missile and submarine-launched systems.

=== Advanced capabilities ===
Multiple independently targetable reentry vehicle (MIRVs) and vertical launching systems are proliferating. India, Pakistan and North Korea are all developing MIRV capable missiles.
