= Launch on warning =

Nuclear strategy

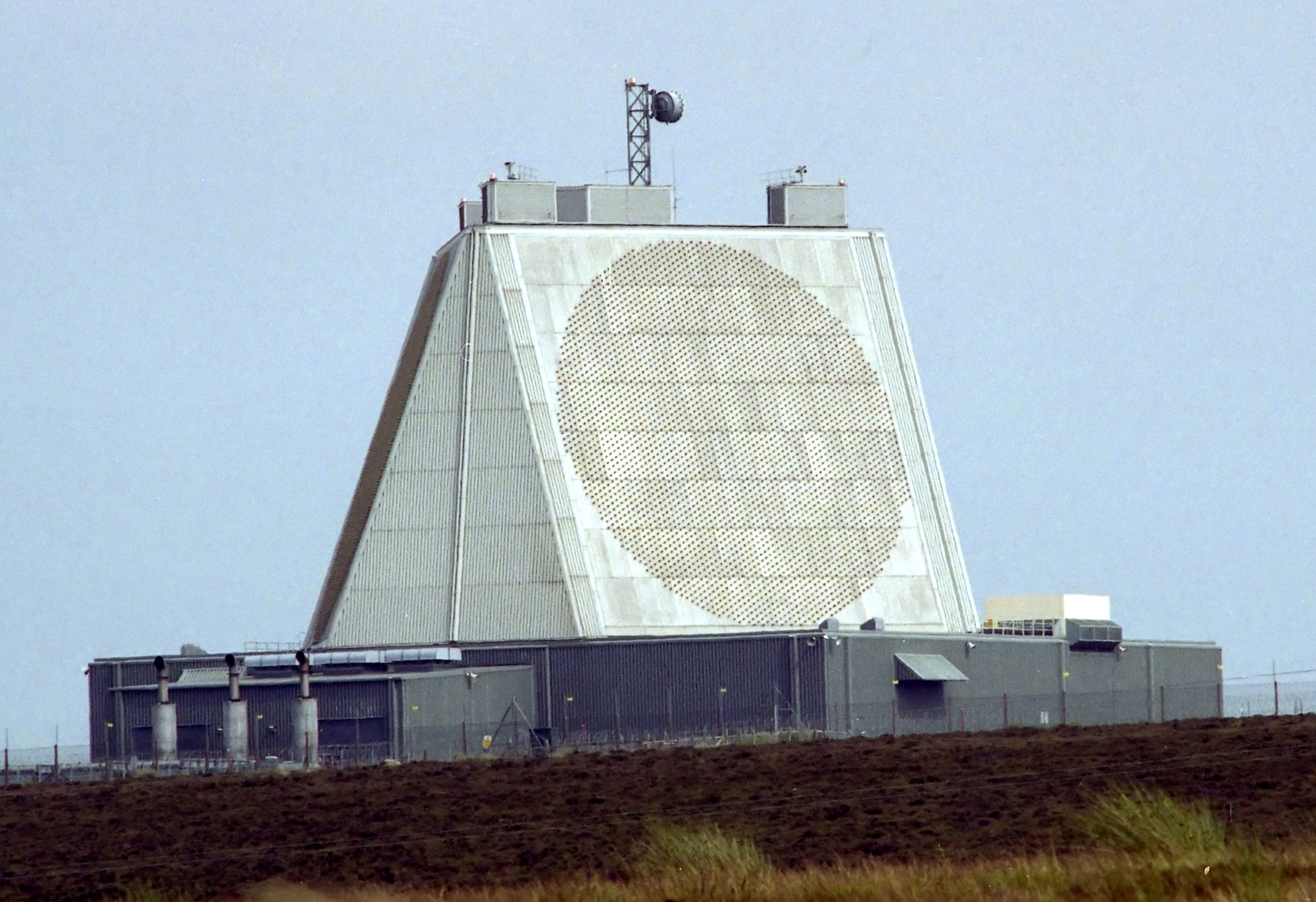
BMEWS solid-state phased-array radar at RAF Fylingdales

Launch on warning (LOW), or fire on warning, is a strategy of nuclear weapon retaliation where a retaliatory strike is launched upon warning of enemy nuclear attack and while its missiles are still in the air, before detonation occurs. It gained recognition during the Cold War between the Soviet Union and the United States. With the invention of intercontinental ballistic missiles (ICBMs), launch on warning became an integral part of mutually-assured destruction (MAD) theory. US land-based missiles can reportedly be launched within 5 minutes of a presidential decision to do so and submarine-based missiles within 15 minutes.

== History ==
Before the introduction of intercontinental ballistic missiles (ICBMs), the US Strategic Air Command (SAC) had multiple bombers on patrol at all times in a program known as Operation Chrome Dome. In the event of a Soviet nuclear strike, SAC would order its already-airborne bombers to fly to the other country and to drop their nuclear payload on predetermined targets. The bombers were typically either B-47 Stratojets or B-52 Stratofortresses, and there were three major flight routes. Keeping bombers in the air assured that a second strike would be feasible even if the first strike impaired ground facilities. At the height of the Cold War, the US had special Boeing EC-135 "Looking Glass" aircraft that were equipped as control centers for the nuclear arsenal. The battle staff included a general or flag officer, who was authorized to order a retaliatory strike if the President could not be contacted.

Launch on warning has its roots in US President Dwight Eisenhower's "Positive Control" strategy but really took shape with the introduction of the Minuteman missile. Since many ICBMs, including the Minuteman, were launched from underground silos, the concern arose that a first strike by one nation could destroy the ground launch facilities of the other nation which thus could not retaliate.

In 1997, a US official stated that the US had the technical capability for launch on warning but did not intend to use a launch on warning posture and that the position had not changed in the 1997 presidential decision directive on nuclear weapon doctrine.

There were two primary options. One option, "retaliation after ride-out," required the second-strike nation to wait until after it had been attacked to launch its missiles. Some portion of the nuclear arsenal would inevitably be destroyed in such an attack, which led to both superpowers investing heavily in survivable-basing modes for their nuclear forces, including hardened underground missile silos for ICBMs, and submarine-launched ballistic missiles. The other choice was "launch on warning," the launch of nuclear missiles before the other side's missiles could destroy them. That became possible primarily because of improvements in missile technology that allowed for faster launches. The capability was further enhanced in the 1970s with the deployment of space-based launch detection technology on both sides: the American geosynchronous Defense Support Program and Soviet Oko satellites. Evidence found in declassified documents suggests that launch on warning was, at least in part, US policy from the late 1950s to at least the 1970s. The U.S. nuclear weapons employment policy was modified slightly in 1981, stipulating that the U.S. was henceforth "not to rely on launching our nuclear forces in an irrevocable manner" upon receipt of information that a Soviet missile attack was underway, but that the U.S. "must be prepared to launch our recallable bomber forces upon warning that a Soviet nuclear attack has been initiated."

Strategies are available that can reduce the effectiveness of a launch-on-warning stance. For example, the first-strike nation can use a technique, called X-ray pin-down, to delay a retaliatory response. It involves a barrage of submarine-based missiles fired from close range in a "depressed trajectory" mode that reaches its targets in minutes. The warheads would be set to explode every minute or so at high altitudes, which would significantly disrupt the attacked nation's ability to launch its own ICBMs.

=== China ===
In the early 2020s, some of China's nuclear forces were reported to have moved toward a launch on warning (LOW) posture. A key PLA doctrinal text, The Science of Military Strategy, implied in 2013, 2015, and 2017, that it viewed launch-on-warning as consistent with no-first-use. In 2024, the United States Department of State described China's no-first-use policy as "ambiguous". The U.S. Department of Defense's 2024 China Military Power Report stated that China was shifting toward a LOW posture for early-warning second strike capabilities. Defense analysts have contended that China's shift away from a strict no-first-use strategy and toward a LOW posture would allow it to retaliate upon the detection of incoming warheads without waiting for them to strike Chinese targets first. In November 2025, the Defense Threat Reduction Agency reported that China had already developed infrastructure and command structures to support a LOW posture. In December 2025, the U.S. Department of Defense's 2025 China Military Power Report reiterated China's move toward a LOW posture.

The move to LOW was seen as a response to progress made in U.S. missile defense systems (such as the Aegis Ballistic Missile Defense System and Terminal High Altitude Area Defense) and long-range precision strike abilities (such as Conventional Prompt Strike), which decreases the survivability of a Chinese second strike, as well as the possibility that American strategy may require nuclear weapons to compensate for the numerical disadvantage of its conventional forces overseas. There is debate among Chinese strategists regarding the merits and drawbacks of a LOW posture similar to that of Russia and the United States, and as of 2023 the bulk of China's strategic forces had not moved to a LOW posture. Some analysts contend that because a LOW posture empowers the PLA to a greater degree due to compressed decision-making timelines, it could potentially degrade the CCP's absolute control of the military.

== See also ==
- Bulletin of the Atomic Scientists
- DEFCON
- Deterrence theory
- Doomsday clock
- Fail-deadly
- Game theory
- Mutually assured destruction
- Nash equilibrium
- Stanislav Petrov
- Dr. Strangelove
