= Nuclear weapons of China =

People's Republic of China
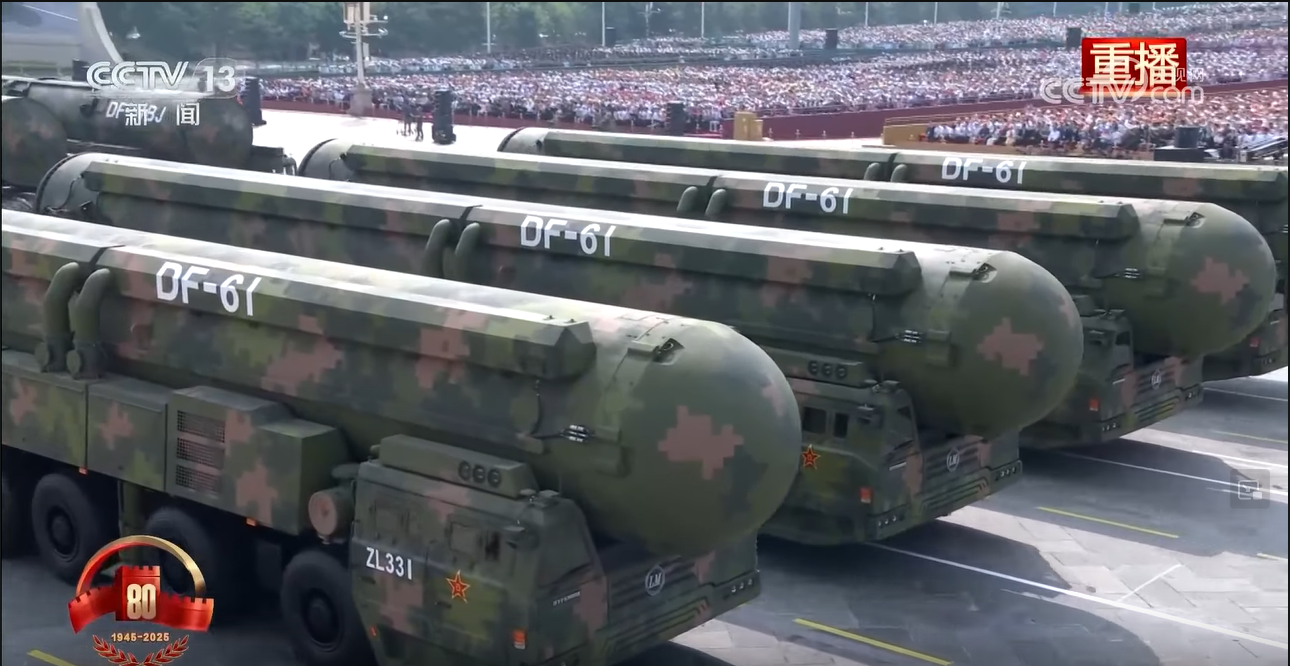
- DF-61 intercontinental ballistic missiles on display during the 2025 China Victory Day Parade

- People's Republic of China Territory claimed but not controlled
- Nuclear program start date: 15 January 1955
- First nuclear weapon test: 16 October 1964
- First thermonuclear weapon test: 28 December 1966
- Last nuclear test: 29 July 1996
- Largest yield test: 4 Mt: Atmospheric – 4 Mt (17 November 1976); Underground – 660~1,000 kt (21 May 1992)
- Total tests: 45 (Note: According to the United Nations, China carried out 45 nuclear tests. See List of nuclear weapons tests of China.)
- Current stockpile: 620 (estimated)
- Deployed warheads: 34 (estimated)
- Maximum missile range: 20,000 km
- Nuclear triad: Yes
- Strategic forces: Rocket Force; Dongfeng land-based ballistic missiles; Navy; Type 094 submarines; JL-3 ballistic missiles; Air Force; Xi'an H-6N bombers; JL-1 ballistic missiles
- NPT party: Yes (1992, one of five recognized nuclear-weapon states)
- Related institutions: China National Nuclear Corporation

China's stockpile of nuclear weapons is the world's third-largest, estimated at 620 nuclear warheads as of 2026. (Note: 2026 estimates by the think tanks Federation of American Scientists and Stockholm International Peace Research Institute.) China was the fifth country to develop nuclear weapons, conducting its first test in 1964 and its first thermonuclear test (Note: China tested a small-scale hundred-kiloton-range two-stage thermonuclear explosive in December 1966, followed by a three-megaton explosive in June 1967, Project 639.) in 1966. One of the five nuclear-weapon states recognized by the Nuclear Non-Proliferation Treaty (NPT), China conducted 45 nuclear tests before signing the Comprehensive Nuclear-Test-Ban Treaty in 1996. China is significantly expanding its arsenal, projected to reach 1,000 warheads by 2030 and up to 1,500 by 2035. Compared to the arsenals of the United States and Russia, China's warheads are believed to have a similar technological level, with a much smaller proportion (Note: About 34 warheads are estimated to be deployed as of 2026.) deployed on delivery systems, and the remainder stored separately. (Note: Includes a large underground central warhead storage facility near Baoji, Shaanxi, and smaller storage sites near People's Liberation Army Rocket Force regional bases.)

Since 2020, the People's Liberation Army has operated a nuclear triad. An estimated 509 warheads are assigned to Dongfeng ballistic missiles, 72 to JL-3 missiles on Type 094 submarines, and 20 to Xi'an H-6 strategic bombers. China is upgrading its triad with the development of the Xi'an H-20 stealth bomber, Type 096 submarine, hypersonic glide vehicles, and larger missile silo fields. Its early warning systems include at least three satellites, and four large phased array radars. China's anti-ballistic missiles include HQ-29, HQ-19, and S-400 systems.

Since 1964, China has declared a no-first-use policy and called for an international no-first-use treaty. It has not fielded tactical nuclear weapons. Prior to the 21st century, China held to a minimal deterrence policy focused on countervalue targets. Officially, China's nuclear command and control requires the Politburo and Central Military Commission to jointly authorize the alerting and use of nuclear weapons. In the 2020s, some of China's nuclear forces are believed to have adopted a launch on warning posture.

China consistently rejects official bilateral (Note: China and the US engaged in semi-official "Track 1.5 diplomacy" on their strategic nuclear dynamics from 2004 to 2019, see § Track 1.5. Chinese officials have also expressed interest in multilateral nuclear talks among the five NPT-recognized nuclear-weapon states, and among the five plus India, Israel, and Pakistan.) arms control talks with the US, on the grounds of its much smaller stockpile. In the early Cold War's Korean War and Taiwan Strait Crises, China confronted US nuclear threats, which were partially deterred by the Soviet nuclear arsenal. The Soviet Union transferred nuclear and missile technology from 1955 until the early Sino-Soviet split in 1960. The Rocket Force has operated most Chinese nuclear delivery systems since its 1966 founding as the Second Artillery Corps. Following the Sino-Soviet border conflict, China viewed the Soviet Armed Forces as its greatest threat, until a détente in 1989. China's nuclear weapons planning refocused on the US in the early 2000s, with relations strained by the Third Taiwan Strait Crisis and US bombing of the Chinese embassy in Belgrade.

China's civilian and military nuclear industries are operated by China National Nuclear Corporation, formerly the Second Ministry of Machine Building. All documented nuclear tests, 23 atmospheric and 22 underground, were conducted at Lop Nur Nuclear Test Base in Xinjiang. China is believed to have halted weapons-grade nuclear material production in 1990. China substantially aided Pakistan's nuclear weapons program, and influenced the programs of India and Taiwan. Like other CTBT adherents, (Note: China signed but did not ratify the treaty and has declared a unilateral nuclear testing moratorium.) China is believed to use supercomputers and inertial confinement fusion in a program analogous to stockpile stewardship. China is also reported to have operated chemical and biological weapons programs during the Cold War and possibly beyond.

== History ==
=== Pre-program ===
Chinese Communist Party (CCP) chairman Mao Zedong referred to nuclear weapons as a paper tiger which, although they would not determine the outcome of a war, could still be used by great powers to scare and coerce. Four days after the atomic bombing of Nagasaki, Mao first argued against overstating the military significance of nuclear weapons, writing "Why didn't Japan surrender when the two atom bombs were dropped on her and why did she surrender as soon as the Soviet Union sent troops?" In 1946 comments to American journalist Anne Louise Strong, he stated, "The atom bomb is a paper tiger which the US reactionaries use to scare people. It looks terrible, but in fact it isn't. Of course, the atom bomb is a weapon of mass slaughter, but the outcome of a war is decided by the people, not one or two new types of weapon."

During the Korean War, the US prepared contingency plans to use nuclear weapons against China, but feared doing so would result in Soviet attacks on US-occupied Japan. Even prior to China's entry into the war, mobilized forces in northeast China that would become the People's Volunteer Army (PVA) were deeply demoralized by potential US nuclear attacks, with political commissar Du Ping reporting psychological debilitation in 10% of troops. The May 1953 US Upshot–Knothole Grable nuclear test of a nuclear artillery system is sometimes considered a contributing factor to the July Korean Armistice Agreement, to which China's People's Volunteer Army was a signatory.

After 1952, the Eisenhower administration pursued the New Look policy through which nuclear weapons would be viewed as a "virtually conventional" force. United States nuclear weapons were deployed to Guam in 1951, Japan in 1954, the Philippines in 1957, and South Korea and Taiwan in 1958. In 1962, British nuclear weapons were deployed to Singapore. Some scholars write that the Eisenhower administration's threats during the First Taiwan Strait Crisis to use nuclear weapons against military targets in Fujian province prompted Mao to begin China's nuclear program. Mao favored China's development of nuclear weapons because "In today's world, if we don't want to be bullied by others, we should have atomic weapons by all means."

Mao's attitude toward nuclear weapons sometimes strained relations with the Soviet Union, which regarded his statements as cavalier, particularly his 1955 assertion that:

The Chinese people are not to be cowed by US atomic blackmail. Our country has a population of 600 million and an area of 9,600,000 square kilometers. The United States cannot annihilate the Chinese nation with its small stack of atom bombs. Even if the US atom bombs were so powerful that, when dropped on China, they would make a hole right through the earth, or even blow it up, that would hardly mean anything to the universe as a whole, though it might be a major event for the solar system.

During this Strait Crisis, Mao and Zhou Enlai informed the Soviets they were willing to risk a US nuclear attack, while Soviet and Chinese archives make clear the Chinese leadership had no expectation of a Soviet nuclear retaliation on their behalf.

However, during the Second Taiwan Strait Crisis, the US Central Intelligence Agency and Departments of Defense and State all concluded that US nuclear attacks on Fujian province, opposite the Republic of China-controlled Kinmen and Matsu Islands, risked Soviet nuclear attacks on US bases, the Navy's Seventh Fleet, and possibly general war with the Soviet Union. Gerard C. Smith, Assistant Secretary of State to John Foster Dulles, warned him that the US would likely have to choose between defeat or large-scale Strategic Air Command attacks on China that risked general war with the Soviet Union.

=== Early program and Soviet assistance ===
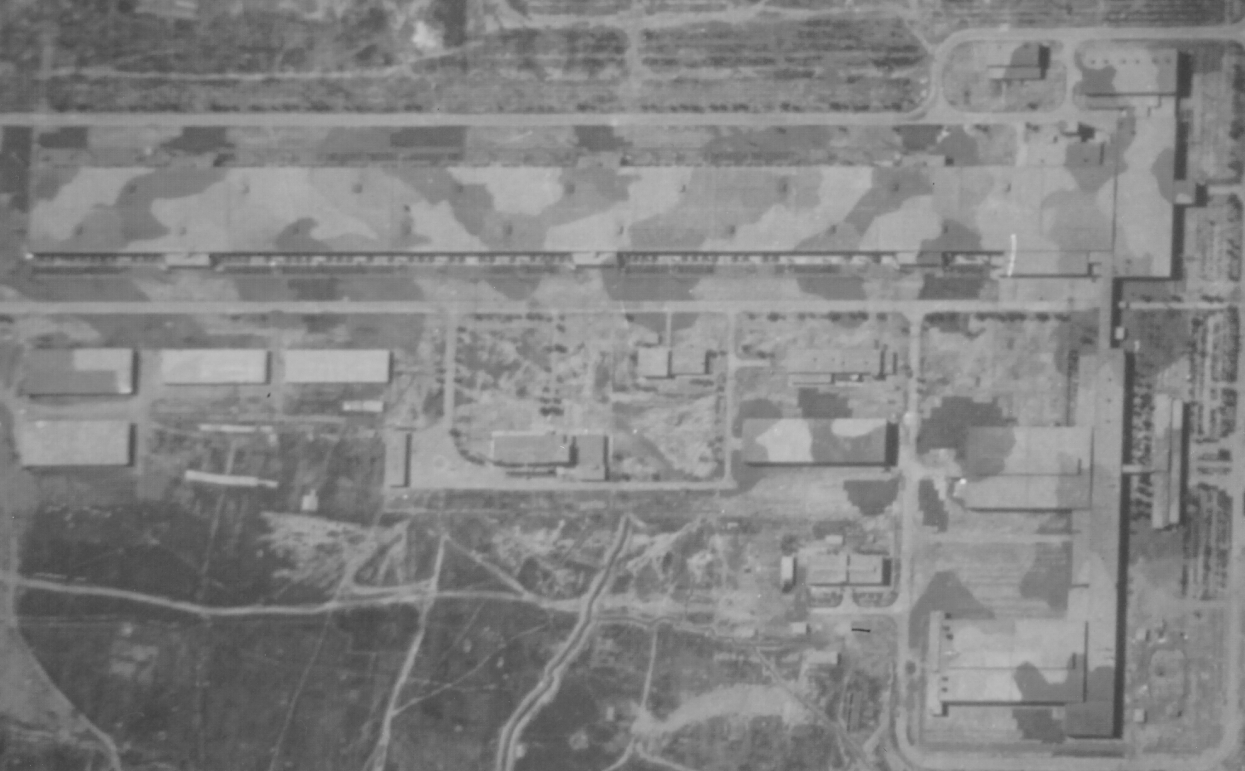
Lanzhou enrichment plant imaged by a US KH-7 Gambit satellite in 1966.

From the inception, China's central government gave the nuclear program the highest priority in materials, finances, and manpower.

In July 1954, one Soviet expert began working with the Chinese on uranium ore exploration. The discovery of uranium in Guangxi in fall 1954 provided further impetus to China's desire to develop nuclear weapons.

On 15 January 1955, China began its nuclear weapons program.

In 1955, the Soviet Union began the granting of student visas for nuclear physics courses to Chinese students. Qian Sanqiang, Jiang Nanxiang, and Yu Wen selected 350 students to study in the USSR and other Warsaw Pact countries, in benefit of Chinese nuclear research. From 1955, the two countries began signing nuclear-related treaties.

In November 1956, China established the Third Ministry of Machine Building (which was in February 1958 renamed the Second Ministry of Machine Building) to oversee its nuclear program.

As a result of the Anti-Party Group incident in the Soviet Union, Soviet leader Nikita Khrushchev's position within the Eastern Bloc became insecure for a time, thus necessitating the support of the CCP and Mao. The CCP subsequently traded its support for Khrushchev for Soviet technology of nuclear weapons. In October 1957, concluded the "New Defense Technical Accord", which allowed for nuclear-weapons technology transfer. This involved two R-2 theatre ballistic missiles, and the unrealized transfer of a model nuclear weapon along the lines of the RDS-27.

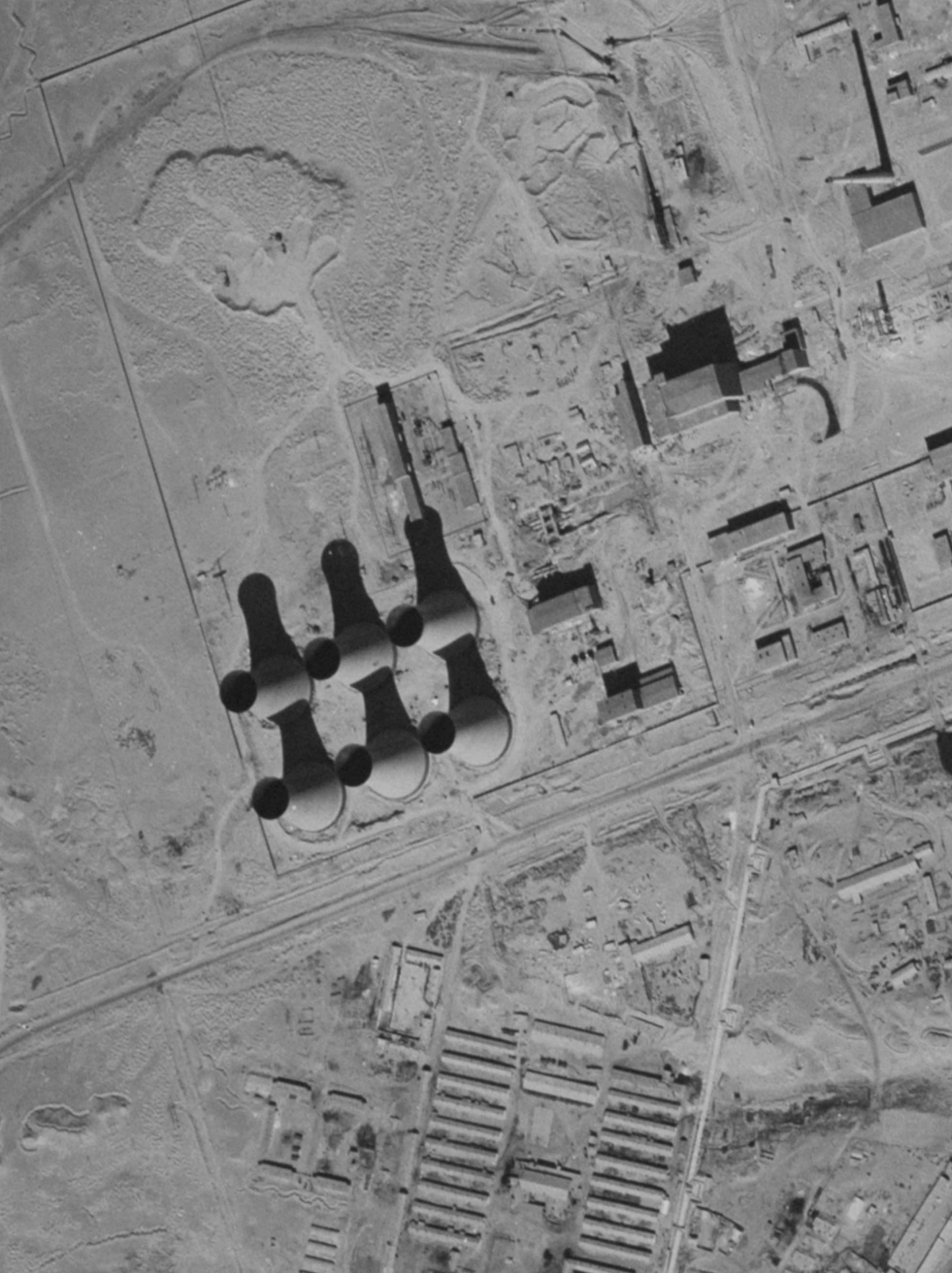
The reactor site near Jiuquan for plutonium production, imaged by a US KH-7 Gambit satellite in 1966.

In January 1958, China established the Ninth Bureau to be responsible for nuclear weapons research and design. It began developing its research and design base (Base 221, renamed Plant 221 in 1965) in Haiyan, Qinghai province. In July 1958, the Second Ministry of Machine Building approved plans for a transitional research institute in Beijing while Base 221 was being built. That research institute (first named the Huayuan Road Project and later renamed the Beijing Ninth Institute) was where most of the development work on China's first atomic bomb occurred and was where researchers received and studied initial data provided by the Soviet Union.

Construction of a uranium refinement plant in Baotou and enrichment plant in Lanzhou began in 1958, and a plutonium production facility in Jiuquan and the Lop Nur nuclear test site by 1960. The Soviet Union provided assistance in the early Chinese program by sending advisers to help in the facilities devoted to fissile material production. In return, China exported raw uranium ore to the USSR.

Scholar Jeffrey Lewis noted in China's 1958 nuclear program guidelines its explicit rejection of tactical nuclear weapons and view of nuclear weapons as primarily political tools influencing the decision towards a small strategic arsenal.

In 1958, the National Defense Science and Technology Commission (NDSTC) was established with Nie Rongzhen as its director to oversee the Second Ministry of Machine Building, the Lop Nur Nuclear Weapon Test Base, and the Fifth Academy of the Defense Ministry (which focused on missile programs). In July 1958, along with Nie, Chen Yun and Bo Yibo were assigned to a "three persons" group to oversee nuclear development.

In July 1958, three Soviet experts visited Beijing to share limited technical details on an atomic weapon. Intended as an introductory lecture, the Soviet experts did not share any information more recent than 1951. It was the only meeting of its kind before the Soviet Union reneged on the New Defense Technical Accord.

In 1958, Khrushchev told Mao that he planned to discuss arms control with the United States and Britain. China was already opposed to Khrushchev's post-Stalin policy of peaceful coexistence. Although Soviet officials assured China that it was under the Soviet nuclear umbrella, the disagreements widened the emerging Sino-Soviet split. The Soviet Union failed to comply with the New Technical Accord and in June 1959 sent a letter formally stating that it would not provide a nuclear bomb prototype. That same month, the two nations formally ended their agreement on military and technology cooperation, and in July 1960, all Soviet assistance with the Chinese nuclear program was abruptly terminated and all Soviet technicians were withdrawn from the program. As the Soviets backed out, Chinese officials realized that they had to develop hydrogen bomb technology without any Soviet assistance and would need to begin the work immediately, without waiting for successful results from a fission bomb.

=== Independent program ===
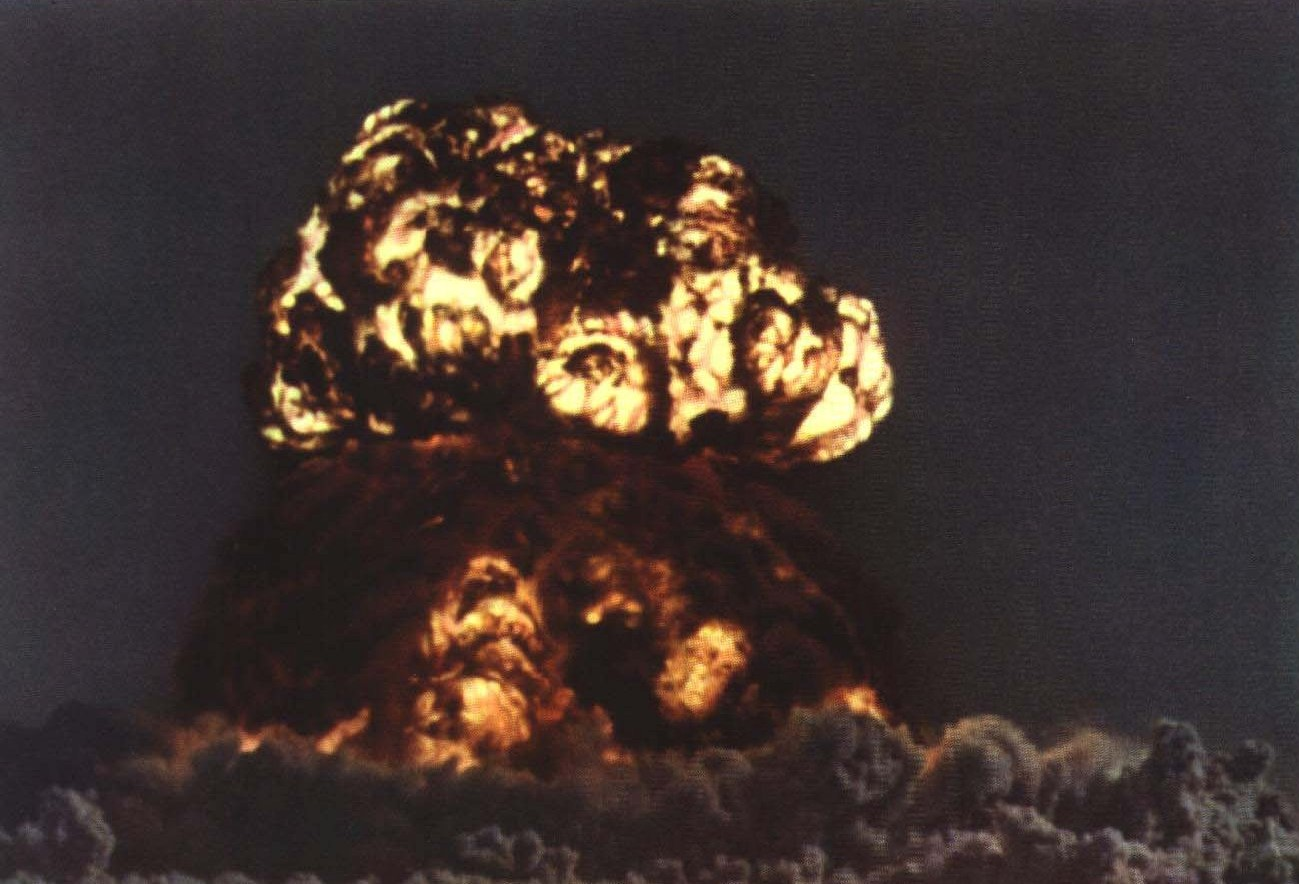
The mushroom cloud from Project 596, China's first nuclear test, Lop Nur, 1964.

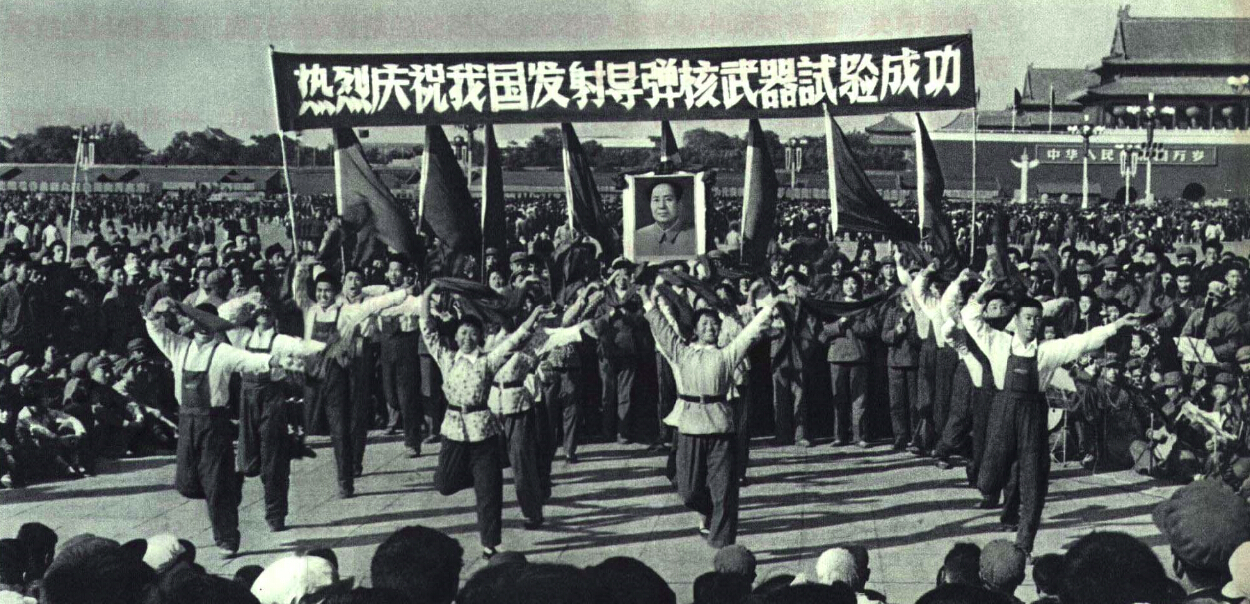
Celebration of the fourth Chinese nuclear test, launched on a Dongfeng-2 missile, Tiananmen Square, October 1966.

Chinese researchers viewed June 1959 as the rebirth of the nuclear program, with the Second Ministry and the Ninth Bureau commemorating the date of Soviet withdrawal of support in the codename for China's first atomic bomb, "596" (i.e., the sixth month of 1959).

In spring 1960, the Ninth Institute reverse engineered the 1951 model presented by Soviet experts in 1958. The Chinese model used a core of uranium-235 instead of the plutonium in the Soviet model.

In July 1960, all Soviet advisers were withdrawn from the Lanzhou enrichment plant, at the time China's only active project for a fissile material production.

In mid-1961, a heightened factional debate threatened the termination of the nuclear program. The debate was influenced by the Great Leap Forward's Great Chinese Famine, the withdrawal of Soviet advisers, Sino-Indian border tensions, and increased American forces in the Vietnam War. Against the nuclear weapons establishment, a group representing the defense establishment, led by He Long and Luo Ruiqing, pushed for its termination, to redirect its large expenses towards conventional weapons. A key issue was the Maoist military doctrine of people's war. The Central Military Commission reaffirmed Mao's statements that "weapons are important elements of war, but they are not decisive", and that "the physical atomic bomb is important, but the spiritual atomic bomb is more important."

At a series of senior leadership meetings, the nuclear weapons establishment emerged on top, with a resolution to accelerate its work ahead of schedule. Nie Rongzhen presented existing achievements of the nuclear program, and Minister of Foreign Affairs Chen Yi added "at present I still do not have adequate backup. If you succeed in producing the atomic bomb and guided missiles, then I can straighten my back."

In 1961, Premier Zhou Enlai articulated China's rationale for its conventional and nuclear military strategies, stating, "Once we have missiles and nuclear weapons, we can then prevent the use of missiles and nuclear weapons; if we don't have missiles, the imperialists can use missiles. But to face combat, we still need conventional weapons."

In 1962, President Liu Shaoqi announced the creation of the Central Special Committee (also referred to as The Fifteen-Member Special Commission) to coordinate the departments with the overlapping authority related to nuclear weapons. Zhou Enlai was appointed director of the group, which became the most body with overall oversight of China's nuclear weapon's program, including nuclear weapons development.

According to Arms Control and Disarmament Agency director William Foster, the American government, under the Kennedy and Johnson administrations, was concerned about China's nuclear program and studied ways to sabotage or attack it, perhaps with the aid of Taiwan or the Soviet Union, but Khrushchev was not interested. In 1964 as China prepared for its first nuclear weapon test, Chinese leadership received intelligence which increased its concerns that the United States would commit a surgical strike on its nuclear program. These concerns prompted consideration of whether China should delay its first test, on the theory that a test would alert the United States and the Soviet Union to the progress of China's nuclear capabilities, but China would not yet be able to deploy nuclear devices to deter or counter an attack. In September 1964, Mao decided that the planned test should proceed, stating, "[T]he atomic bomb is to frighten others. It [does] not necessarily [need to be] utilized. Since it is for frightening, it is better to expose it early." The test preparations proceeded with additional air defenses and security against sabotage.

=== First tests ===
China conducted its first nuclear test, code-named 596, on 16 October 1964. It was an implosion design, with a spherical core of highly enriched uranium, produced at the Lanzhou plant.

On 20 March 1965, Zhou Enlai explained China's testing philosophy as: "We oppose nuclear blackmail and nuclear threats, and we do not advocate hundreds of nuclear tests. Therefore, our nuclear tests must take place based on the needs of the military, science, and technology. All tests must be conducted as 'one test to achieve multiple results.'"

On 1 July 1966, Chinese leadership established the headquarters in Beijing of a new branch of the People's Liberation Army, the Second Artillery Corps, to operate nuclear missiles. In late 1965, Chinese physicists developed a Teller-Ulam design equivalent for thermonuclear weapons. On 9 May 1966, China carried out the 596L nuclear test, of a layer cake design, a type of boosted fission weapon. China's first multi-stage thermonuclear weapon test, "629", occurred with a tower shot on 28 December 1966, at a demonstration yield of 120 kt. This was the shortest time that any of the five nuclear powers of the period had progressed from fission bomb to hydrogen bomb. Mao had urged the importance of a quick progression from fission bomb to hydrogen bomb, instructing Liu Jie, "If we have hydrogen bombs and missiles, wars may not be fought, and peace will be more secure. We make the atomic bombs but will not make too many. It will be used to scare the enemies and embolden ourselves."

A more powerful hydrogen bomb was air-drop tested at 3.3 Mt in the Project 639 test on 17 June 1967. This was the test announced by the People's Daily and interpreted internationally as China's first hydrogen bomb test. The test was planned for 1 October 1967, but was moved after project leader Peng Huanwu speculated France may test a hydrogen bomb before then. The mentality of outpacing France's program influenced the assembly of the 639 device amid the fervor of the Cultural Revolution.

China tested its first air-dropped bomb in 1965. Afterwards, it stopped developing bombs that could be delivered by bombers (Chinese planes at the time had short ranges and were deemed too vulnerable to anti-aircraft defenses) and began focusing on land-based missiles and warheads. China therefore maintained a limited number of aerial bombs, primarily with symbolic rather than strategic meaning in mind.

China shifted from highly enriched uranium to plutonium weapons beginning with its eighth nuclear test, codenamed "524", also at 3 Mt, on 27 December 1968. It subsequently focused on weapon miniaturization, for missile warheads, and for delivery by fighter instead of bomber.

The Sino-Soviet split prompted China to view the Soviet Union, instead of the United States, as its biggest threat and accordingly to focus on developing its nuclear capabilities to counter the Soviet Union. In 1969, following the border conflict Battle of Zhenbao Island in March, the USSR considered a massive nuclear attack on China, targeting cities and nuclear facilities. It made military activity in the Russian Far East, and informed its allies and the United States of this potential attack. The Chinese government and archives were evacuated from Beijing while the People's Liberation Army scattered from its bases. The crisis abated when US Secretary of State Henry Kissinger informed the Soviet Union that an attack on China would be met by a US nuclear attack on 130 Soviet cities. This threat of attack lead to the development of the Kuangbiao-1 tactical nuclear bomb, which could be delivered against invading Soviet tank columns by Nanchang Q-5 ground-attack fighters instead of Xi'an H-6 bombers.

=== Refining strategic missile warheads ===
Despite the 1963 Partial Nuclear Test Ban Treaty concluded by the US, UK, and USSR, China, alongside France, continued atmospheric nuclear testing in the 1960s and 1970s. Before the treaty was signed, Premier Zhou Enlai requested a report from the Second Ministry of Machine Building and relevant experts to address the implications. The experts asserted that the three countries participating in the ban had already conducted enough atmospheric tests such that the ban would have little impact on their nuclear programs. The participating countries could also continue underground testing and expand their arsenals. Accordingly, the group concluded that the purpose of the treaty was not to reduce the threat of nuclear conflict, but for the participating countries to retain their nuclear monopoly. The report provided the background for the PRC's statement upon the signing of the treaty that it was "a big fraud to fool the people of the world" and a ploy to impede China's development of nuclear weapons. Although not a signatory, China's government nonetheless felt international pressure to pursue underground testing. China conducted its first underground nuclear test in 1969.

The Cultural Revolution resulted in interruption to nuclear weapons research (among other research programs), with significant changes to nuclear weapons research leadership including in 1969 when Nie Rongzhen was pressured to resign his role at the NDSTC.

China tested its first boosted fission thermonuclear primary in its twelfth test in November 1971, using plutonium with a small amount of highly enriched uranium. This and the four following tests developed the three-megaton warhead for the DF-3 intermediate-range ballistic missile.

China's first submarine-launched ballistic missile, the JL-1, during its first successful sea test, 1982.

In July 1970, a JL-1 submarine-launched ballistic missile mockup underwent water-drop tests from a crane on the Nanjing Yangtze River Bridge. On 7 October 1982, the JL-1 was first tested at sea, launched from a Golf-class submarine, and experienced an attitude control failure, self-destructing. On 12 October 1982, the JL-1 was successfully test-launched from a submarine. The Chinese submarine Changzheng 6, designed as the country's first ballistic missile submarine and deployed to Jianggezhuang Naval Base, is not believed to have conducted any patrols with nuclear weapons on board, but conducted its first successful test-launch of a JL-1 on 27 September 1988. From 1983 to 1988, the Changzheng 6 conducted a "five-year storage test" of JL-1 warheads and missiles, after which the weapon was approved and the first warhead batch ordered.

On 16 October 1980, China conducted Operation 21-716, a finalization test of the 515 nuclear warhead used in the DF-21 IRBM and JL-1 SLBM. The device was dropped from a H-6A bomber, with a yield of approximately 700 kilotons. This 1980 test was the most recent known atmospheric nuclear test in the world.

=== Move to underground testing ===
China began its neutron bomb development in September 1977. Tests between 1982 and 1988 developed a neutron bomb, which was ultimately not deployed. It was publicly announced by Zhao Qizheng in 1999. In 1992, a two-point implosion aspherical primary was first tested. China was accused using espionage, most notably in the Cox Report, throughout the 1980s and early 1990s to acquire the US W88 nuclear warhead design as well as guided ballistic missile technology. Details of US intelligence on Chinese nuclear weapons were released in the press surrounding the Cox Report and abortive trial of Wen Ho Lee.

In 1982, Deng Xiaoping initiated transfer of nuclear weapons technology to Pakistan, including the design of the simple "548" codenamed highly enriched uranium implosion bomb. This design was first tested by China in its fourth nuclear test in 1966, mated to a Dongfeng 2 missile. A Pakistani derivative of the device was tested in China in 1990. China is also believed to have conducted "hydronuclear" possibly subcritical testing for France in the 1990s. China's level of warhead technology is believed to be similar to that of the US and Russia, despite conducting far fewer nuclear tests.

On 8 June 1996, China announced that it would conduct one more test to ensure the safety of its nuclear weapons and then cease testing. China's last nuclear test was on 29 July 1996. According to Chinese nuclear scientists, the date was chosen the memorialize the tenth anniversary of Deng Jiaxian's death. In September 1996, China signed but did not ratify the Comprehensive Nuclear-Test-Ban Treaty (CTBT), which has yet to enter into force.

During the Cold War, China relied on concealment of its nuclear forces as the primary mechanism for their survivability. Beginning in 1996, China has increasingly relied on the mobility of its land-based nuclear forces as a means of survivability.

=== 2000s ===
The 2002 China Military Power Report stated that the DF-5B was capable of carrying China added multiple independently targetable reentry vehicles.

=== 2010s ===
On 1 January 2016, the Second Artillery Corps was renamed to the People's Liberation Army Rocket Force. Despite claims by some, there appears to be no evidence to suggest that the new generation of People's Liberation Army Navy ballistic-missile submarines came under PLARF control.

=== 2020s ===
==== Stockpile expansion ====
In December 2024, the US Department of Defense assessed that China had 600 nuclear warheads and would have 1,000 by 2030.

In December 2025, the U.S. Department of Defense's China Military Power Report stated that China's nuclear stockpile "remained in the low 600s through 2024, reflecting a slower rate of production when compared to previous years." The report also said China had loaded more than 100 DF-31 ICBMs with solid propellant in silos near its border with Mongolia.

In April 2026, CNN reported, citing satellite imagery and analysis, that China has been conducting a massive overhaul of its nuclear weapons infrastructure at sites in the Zitong County region, Sichuan Province (e.g., Sites 906 and 931), as part of a broader modernization effort. In September 2026, The Daily Telegraph, using open-source satellite imagery, reported on expansion at seven sites: Pingtong, Zitong, Lop Nur, Jiuquan, Mianyang, Jinta and Guangyuan.

==== Delivery system development ====
Between 2020 and 2021, China began construction of three large intercontinental ballistic missile silo fields near Yumen City in Gansu, Hami in Xinjiang, and Ordos City in Inner Mongolia. Until 2024, Chinese state media claimed the construction was for windmills. By 2025, these were assessed to total 320 silos for solid-propellant missiles and 30 silos for liquid-fuel DF-5 missiles. They are China's first silos for solid-propellant missiles, which are considered faster than liquid-fueled missiles for response. According to Hans M. Kristensen, the extensive network of silos has been hardened to deter a first strike.

In November 2024, China conducted its first joint patrol with its nuclear-capable Xi'an H-6N bomber and a Russian Tupolev Tu-95MS over the Sea of Japan. China had previously conducted eight joint flights of its Xi'an H-6K non-nuclear-capable strategic bombers with Russian Tu-95s. In March 2025, the Federation of American Scientists assessed that China no longer maintained a small stockpile nuclear gravity bombs for contingency use by H-6 bombers.

The 2025 China Victory Day Parade marked the first public display of China's nuclear triad, and many new nuclear weapons delivery systems. These included the road-mobile solid-fuel DF-61 ICBM, potentially a modification of the DF-41 ICBM, the silo-based liquid-fuel DF-5C ICBM variant, believed by the US Department of Defense to be assigned a multi-megaton warhead, the JL-3 submarine-launched ballistic missile, and the JL-1 air-launched ballistic missile.

==== Missile testing ====
On 25 September 2024, China's People's Liberation Army Rocket Force test launched a DF-31 intercontinental ballistic missile. The missile was launched from Hainan island over 11,700 km to just west of French Polynesia, reaching an estimated apogee of 1,200 km. It was the first test of an ICBM into the Pacific for China in over 40 years, typically testing ICBMs at very high apogees within its own borders. China alerted the US, UK, France, Australia and New Zealand ahead of the test, and was criticized by Australia, New Zealand, Japan, Fiji, and Kiribati.

On 6 July 2026, China test-launched a submarine-launched ballistic missile, likely a JL-2 or JL-3, from a nuclear-powered submarine, into international waters in the South Pacific. This was China's second ballistic missile launch into international waters since 1980, following a DF-31 test in 2024. China gave limited advance notice of the launch. The Japan Coast Guard was informed a day in advance that China had designated a hazard area, including part of Japan’s EEZ south of Wakayama Prefecture, for "falling space debris." However China's Ministry of National Defense clarified the involvement of a ballistic missile only about 90 minutes before launch. The Center for Strategic and International Studies, a US think tank, characterized China's launch notification protocols as weaker than the International Code of Conduct against Ballistic Missile Proliferation, to which China is not a party. On 11 August, 2026, the US and 40 other countries called for at least 24 hours' notice and more information before such launches, without naming China explicitly but citing concerns about miscalculation and regional security. Australian scholar Michael MacArthur Bosack argued China may reject more expansive notification as it would allow other countries to "gather data on the flight parameters and capabilities of Chinese missile systems".

==== US allegations of covert resumed testing ====
In 2020, the United States Department of State alleged that excavation and "explosive containment chambers" at Lop Nur could allow China to return to low-yield nuclear testing, violating the zero-yield standard of the CTBT. China denied the accusations. The same year, nuclear proliferation expert Jeffrey Lewis stated that satellite and seismic signatures of such low-yield tests are "indistinguishable" from CTBT-compliant subcritical testing.

In September 2023, Planet Labs published satellite imagery showing construction at test sites in Lop Nur, Novaya Zemlya in Russia, and Nevada Test Site in the US. Lewis argued these showed "really a lot of hints" that all three countries may resume testing. In December 2023, satellite open-source intelligence showed evidence of drilling shafts in Lop Nur where nuclear weapons testing could resume. Satellite imagery provided evidence of these preparations, revealing the presence of a drilling rig that had created a deep vertical shaft. This shaft was believed to be designed to contain the destructive power of radiation resulting from large nuclear explosions. Some analysts believe that China has been conducting "supercritical tests that create a self-sustained chain reaction in an underground containment vessel but stop well short of a full yield." In January 2025, analysts detected newly excavated soil in the northern rim of the Lop Nur complex, believed to be from horizontal tunnels used for lower-yield nuclear weapons tests.

Prior to his meeting with CCP General Secretary Xi Jinping on 30 October 2025, President Trump, in a social media post, "instructed the Department of War [sic]" to resume testing nuclear weapons "on an equal basis." On 31 October, in an interview with 60 Minutes, Trump claimed Russia, China, Pakistan, and North Korea were carrying out covert nuclear tests. On November 3, Secretary of Energy Chris Wright stated that nuclear testing would not resume, and subcritical testing would continue.

On 6 February 2026, the Under Secretary of State for Arms Control and International Security, Thomas G. DiNanno, expanded US allegations that China had conducted covert underground tests, stating that one such test occurred on 22 June 2020. DiNanno stated that China had prepared for tests with nuclear yields of "hundreds of tons" using a "decoupling" technique, carrying out nuclear explosions in existing underground cavities to reduce their seismic signature. The same day, Robert Floyd, the Executive Secretary of the Preparatory Commission for the Comprehensive Nuclear-Test-Ban Treaty Organization, issued a statement that its International Monitoring System, which is capable of detecting tests above approximately 500 tonnes yield, did not detect any signs of a nuclear explosion on 22 June 2020. On 17 February 2026, the Assistant Secretary of State for International Security and Nonproliferation, Christopher Yeaw, stated that the June 2020 event was a "singular explosion" that took place at Lop Nur and was inconsistent with an earthquake or mining blast. US intelligence sources reportedly believe the resumed testing is for the development of low-yield tactical nuclear weapons. In March 2026, Brandon Williams, head of the National Nuclear Security Administration, stated that China had covertly resumed "testing in the hundreds of tons of yield." According to Diya Ashtakala, writing in the Bulletin of the Atomic Scientists, China has restricted the flow of data from monitoring stations on its territory to the Preparatory Commission for the Comprehensive Nuclear-Test-Ban Treaty Organization.

== Size ==
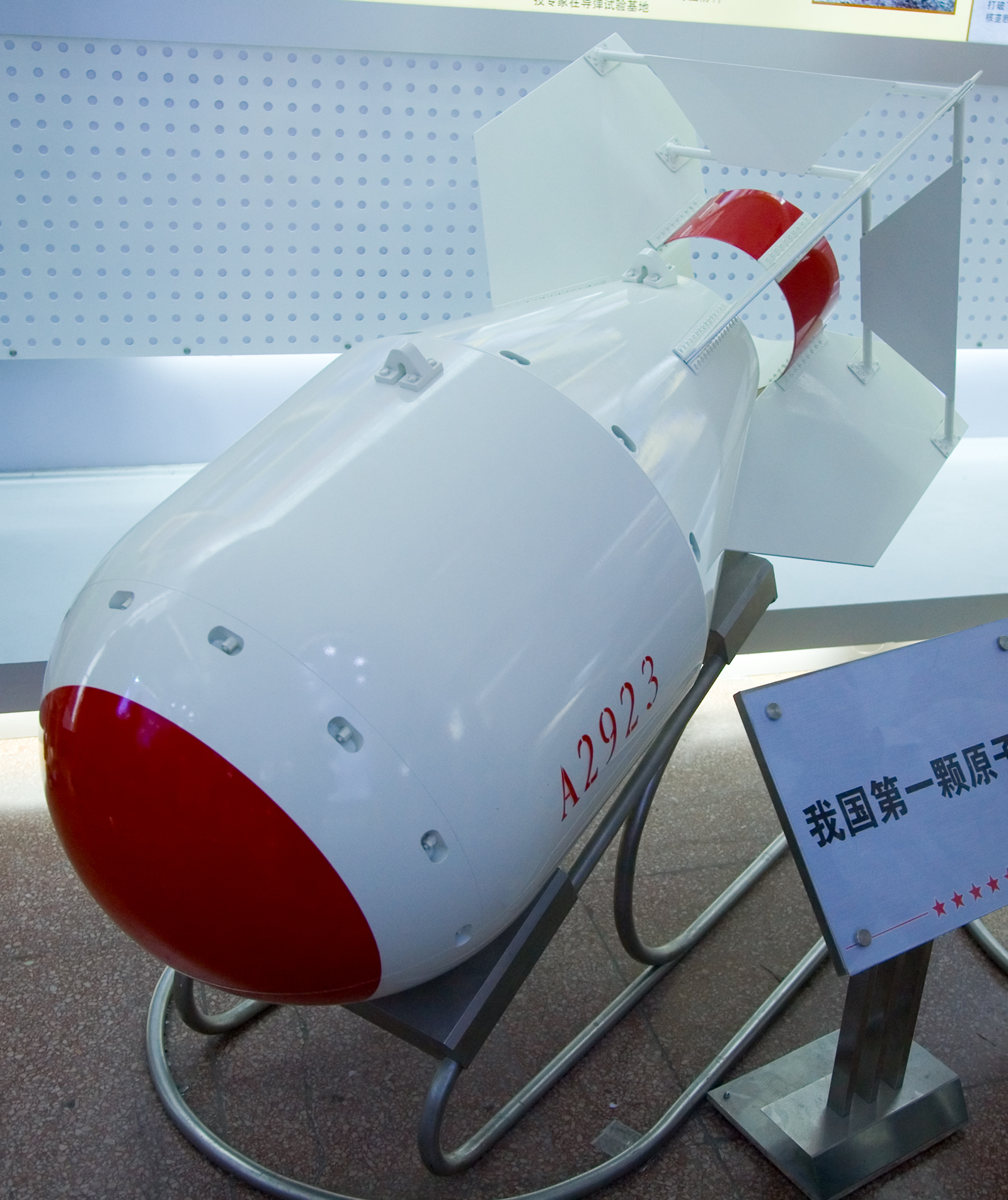
A mock-up of China's first nuclear bomb.

In 2022, United States Strategic Command indicated that China has equipped more nuclear warheads on its ICBMs than the United States (550 according to the New START treaty). In October 2024, the Defense Intelligence Agency reported that China has approximately 300 missile silos and is estimated to reach at least 1000 operational warheads by 2030. In December 2024, the United States Department of Defense estimated China possesses more than 600 operational nuclear warheads.

In 2026, the Federation of American Scientists (FAS) and the Stockholm International Peace Research Institute (SIPRI) estimated that China had at least 620 nuclear warheads. The same year, the FAS estimated that China operates 867 launchers, of which 775 are land-banded.

=== Fissile material production ===
China produced fissile material for its nuclear weapons starting in 1964 and is widely believed to have stopped producing highly enriched uranium in 1987 and plutonium in 1990. As of 2018, its total stockpile (including usage in warheads) was estimated at 14 tons of highly enriched uranium and 2.9 tons of weapons-grade plutonium, the smallest fissile material stockpile among the five NPT-recognized nuclear-weapon states. Scholar Hui Zhang estimated this stockpile could support 730 thermonuclear warheads, assuming that approximately 4 kg of plutonium are used in the primary and 20 kg of highly enriched uranium in the secondary of each thermonuclear weapon. The Federation of American Scientists estimated that the same stockpile could support up to 1,000 thermonuclear warheads, but not the U.S. Department of Defense's projection of 1,500 warheads.

==== Allegations of resuming production ====
In 2022, multiple villages in Sichuan had their land confiscated and residents displaced on the official grounds of a "state secret" to make way for a massive construction expansion at sites long associated with China's nuclear weapons program. The U.S. Department of Defense concluded in 2024 that it was likely that China intended to produce additional fissile material for its military in the near term. An October 2025 Institute for Science and International Security report suggested China may resume plutonium production via either its 821 reactor in Guangyuan (part of the Third Front campaign), or its new CFR-600 fast reactor. In December 2025, an analysis of satellite imagery by the Open Nuclear Network and the Verification Research, Training and Information Centre found that, since 2021, major upgrades have taken place at the Pingtong nuclear site and another in Zitong County in Sichuan producing plutonium pits and explosives used to trigger a nuclear reaction. In February 2026, the US State Department alleged Russia is "helping China develop the weapons-grade fissile material necessary for its expansion".

== Policy ==
=== Command and control ===
China's nuclear command and control requires the agreement of both the CCP's Politburo and Central Military Commission for alerting and use of weapons. As a contingency if communications are disrupted, arrangements exist for teams dispatched from central command to personally deliver launch orders. Academic Fiona Cunningham writes that because such arrangements are difficult to replicate for sea-based nuclear deterrents, the possibility for pre-delegation of nuclear launch authority "cannot be ruled out" and if such arrangements exist, "they are likely to be one of the most closely held secrets of China's nuclear posture."

China's nuclear weapons have historically been kept at a low readiness, with its warheads in a central storage location, physically separated from their launch vehicles. This has assuaged leadership fears of an unauthorized or accidental use. Nonetheless, sometime between 1995 and 2019, China is believed to have equipped its nuclear warheads with a technical control mechanism, similar to the US permissive action link. In 2020, the United States assessed that some DF-31A units have warheads physically available to them, representing a higher readiness level than central storage.

China has historically stored the vast majority of nuclear warheads separately from their launching systems. It had different brigades for nuclear and conventional forces; however, this has changed since the introduction of the DF-26 dual-capable missile in the 21st century, for which brigades are trained in the use of "hot swappable" nuclear and conventional warheads.

In November 2024, Joe Biden and Xi Jinping affirmed the need to maintain human control over the use of nuclear weapons as opposed to artificial intelligence.

=== No first use ===
China's stated policy has been one of no first use while maintaining a secure second-strike capability. Its policy was historically also one of minimal deterrence in which its nuclear arsenal was focused on civilian and industrial countervalue and non-nuclear military targets (as opposed to nuclear-capable counterforce targets). In 1957, Zhou Enlai stated, "We are developing nuclear weapons mainly to resolve the issues of deterrence. The scale does not need to be large. We are forced to build missiles and nuclear weapons, not for a race with the nuclear powers, but for breaking their nuclear monopoly and preventing their use of nuclear weapons." Following its first test in 1964, China stated that:

The Chinese Government has consistently advocated the complete and thorough destruction of nuclear weapons. Had this been realized, China would not have needed to develop the nuclear weapons. The Chinese Government hereby solemnly declares that China will never at any time and under any circumstances be the first to use nuclear weapons.

Mao Zedong and Zhou Enlai generally considered nuclear weapons as strategic and political tools rather than tactical weapons. Mao also signaled that China's interest in nuclear weapons was to achieve minimal deterrence. As director of the NDSTC, which oversaw coordination of departments with authority in nuclear weapons issues, Nie Rongzhen made China's minimal deterrence doctrine explicit, stating, "To free ourselves of the frequent bullying and oppression of the imperialists for over one century, we must develop advanced weapons, missiles and atomic bombs, so that we have the minimum means of reprisal when we are attacked by the imperialists' nuclear weapons." China also implemented centralized command and control arrangements for nuclear weapons so that they could not be used without orders from top leadership. The 1975 General Combat Regulations for a Combined Army stated, "at any time, under any circumstances, we will absolutely not use nuclear weapons first, only when the enemy uses them first, will we, according to the order of the supreme command, then use this kind of weapon to resolutely counterattack." China renewed its no-first-use policy in its official 2019 and 2023 national defense policy white papers.

In its 1964 statement, China called for international treaties prohibiting first use and nuclear use and threats against non-nuclear countries. In 1994, China submitted a "Draft Treaty on No-First Use of Nuclear Weapons" to the other four NPT nuclear-weapon states. In 2024, China submitted to the NPT review conference a "No-first-use of Nuclear Weapons Initiative", repeating calls for an NFU treaty between the P5 states and a separate treaty which prohibits nuclear use and threats against non-nuclear-weapon states and nuclear-weapon-free zones. Other nuclear weapon states have never taken China's NFU treaty proposal seriously and some analysts have stated that China periodically advances its proposal to distract from major developments and build-up of its own nuclear arsenal.

From 1986 to 1993, debates among the political leadership in China addressed the role of China's nuclear forces in potential local wars. Chinese leadership doubted that a first-use posture was credible. Leadership debates continued until 2005 on whether first use was feasible under certain circumstances. After these debates, China decided to remain in a no first use posture. Jiang Zemin reaffirmed the country's retaliatory nuclear posture, saying "We develop strategic nuclear weapons, not in order to attack, but in order to defend. If people don't attack us, we won't attack them, but if people attack us, we must attack them." In 1996, during the Third Taiwan Strait Crisis, PLA general Xiong Guangkai made what some in United States Indo-Pacific Command considered an implied nuclear threat against Los Angeles.

From 2000 to 2006, in the wake of the 1999 United States bombing of the Chinese embassy in Belgrade, PLA strategists and civilian strategists debated whether China should add conditions to its no first use policy, but rejected the idea. China has not publicly clarified whether U.S. allies covered by U.S. nuclear guarantees are exempt from Chinese nuclear use. Some Chinese proponents of conditioning the no-first use policy pointed to the Bush administration's Nuclear Posture Review, which discussed US nuclear weapons in the context of a "Taiwan contingency". Proponents of adding conditions contended that doing so would make China's nuclear deterrence more effective if a "Taiwan contingency" occurred. In 2005, Zhu Chenghu, a PLA major general and dean of the PLA's National Defense University, suggested China could initiate a nuclear first strike on American cities in the continental United States if it intervened in a conflict over Taiwan with conventional forces.

Observers have often doubted the credibility of China's no first use policy. Some have postulated that China may not honor the policy in certain situations such as the sinking of one of its ballistic missile submarines or in a conventional conflict over Taiwan. The 2023 U.S. Congressional Strategic Posture Commission assessed that China would likely use nuclear weapons if non-nuclear attacks threaten its nuclear forces or command system. Such a risk would be heightened in a conflict because China's conventional and nuclear delivery systems are often intermingled, according to academic Caitlin Talmadge. In 2024, the United States Department of State described China's no-first-use policy as "already ambiguous" prior to its recent nuclear arsenal build-up.

Academic Hui Zhang wrote in 2025 that so far there was little evidence to suggest China had changed its nuclear strategy and doctrine, but it has deviated from a minimal deterrence policy. Other observers have also stated that China no longer applies a policy of minimal deterrence.

=== Tactical nuclear weapons ===
China has not fielded tactical nuclear weapons. However, during the Cold War China did begin development of both warheads and delivery systems for tactical nuclear weapons. This included the Kuangbiao-1 air-dropped tactical nuclear weapon, and the accompanying Nanchang Q-5A attack aircraft. At Central Special Committee meetings in 1978 and 1979, Nie proposed to cancel the nuclear capability of the Q-5A, deeming it as inconsistent with China's policy focus on self-defense and its principle of no-first use. The proposal was accepted.

During the Cold War, China developed a neutron bomb, considered to be a tactical nuclear weapon, but refrained from deploying it. It also has not fielded nuclear weapons on delivery systems such as gravity bombs or nuclear artillery.

=== Second strike ===
China's nuclear second strike doctrine is believed to be intentionally disproportionate, focusing on civilian countervalue targets and not military counterforce targets. This is supported by various doctrinal texts of the Second Artillery and later PLARF. One text argues the nuclear counterattack would target political and economic centers, to psychologically shock the enemy and degrade their morale to fight a nuclear war; military targets to limit the adversary's danger toward China; and industrial and transportation targets, impeding the adversary's maneuvering and logistics to weaken its war effort. In 1999, the Federation of American Scientists assessed that this doctrine was due to very high circular error probables, on the order of 0.25–1 mile (0.40–1.6 km) on China's ICBMs, and their high megaton-level yields.

=== Launch on warning ===
In the early 2020s, some of China's nuclear forces were reported to have moved toward a launch on warning (LOW) posture. A key PLA doctrinal text, The Science of Military Strategy, implied in 2013, 2015, and 2017, that it viewed launch-on-warning as consistent with no-first-use. The U.S. Department of Defense's 2024 China Military Power Report stated that China was shifting toward a LOW posture for early-warning second strike capabilities. Defense analysts have contended that China's shift away from a strict no-first-use strategy and toward a LOW posture would allow it to retaliate upon the detection of incoming warheads without waiting for them to strike Chinese targets first. In November 2025, the Defense Threat Reduction Agency reported that China had already developed infrastructure and command structures to support a LOW posture. In December 2025, the U.S. Department of Defense's 2025 China Military Power Report reiterated China's move toward a LOW posture.

The move to LOW was seen as a response to progress made in U.S. missile defense systems (such as the Aegis Ballistic Missile Defense System and Terminal High Altitude Area Defense) and long-range precision strike abilities (such as Conventional Prompt Strike), which decreases the survivability of a Chinese second strike, as well as the possibility that American strategy may require nuclear weapons to compensate for the numerical disadvantage of its conventional forces overseas. There is debate among Chinese strategists regarding the merits and drawbacks of a LOW posture similar to that of Russia and the United States, and as of 2023 the bulk of China's strategic forces had not moved to a LOW posture. Some analysts contend that because a LOW posture empowers the PLA to a greater degree due to compressed decision-making timelines, it could potentially degrade the CCP's absolute control of the military.

=== Adversaries ===
==== United States ====
China's nuclear weapons program was originally initiated in 1955 to counter nuclear weapons threats from the United States. Accordingly, by 1965 its first series of missiles was intended to target US assets: the DF-2A for US bases in South Korea and Taiwan, the DF-3 for US bases in Japan and the Philippines, the DF-4 for the B-52 Stratofortress bomber base on Guam, and the DF-5 for the entire contiguous United States. However, in 1969, due to the Sino-Soviet border conflict, China began aligning with the United States, resulting in the 1972 visit by Richard Nixon to China.

China first gained the ability to strike the contiguous US with the 1995 upgrade to the DF-5A. Following the dissolution of the Soviet Union, strategic relations between China and the United States were strained by events including the 1995–1996 Third Taiwan Strait Crisis, 1999 US bombing of the Chinese embassy in Belgrade and Cox Report, and 2001 Hainan Island incident military aircraft collision. China especially began to perceive a nuclear threat from US missile defense following the 2001 US decision to withdraw from its Anti-Ballistic Missile Treaty with Russia. China's feared the weakness of its only nuclear leverage against the US, as US policy permitted first use, and its DF-5s were vulnerable to a first strike being large, based in silos, requiring slow liquid fuelling before launch, and carrying a single-warhead missiles. China first responded by adding multiple independently targetable reentry vehicle to the DF-5B missiles in 2001. According to scholar Hui Zhang, China lacked a credible second strike capability against the US as recently as 2010, as its twenty silo-based DF-5As were unlikely to survive, and its approximately thirteen remaining deployed road-mobile DF-31 missiles would struggle to penetrate the Ground-Based Midcourse Defense.

==== Soviet Union ====
As the Sino-Soviet split intensified, the Soviet Union began to represent a larger nuclear threat to China. By the mid-1960s, Chinese planners targeted both US and Soviet assets, and by the Sino-Soviet border conflict it had become China's primary adversary. Early Chinese missiles were also intended to target the USSR's cities and industrial centers: the DF-2A for the Soviet Far East, the DF-3 for the eastern and central Soviet regions, and the DF-4 for Moscow and the Soviet west, and the DF-5 also for the Soviet west. To scramble against the Soviet threat, the warheads for DF-3 missiles were mass-produced from 1969 before their first proof test in 1973. By 1972, the "506" warhead for the DF-5 was designed specifically to penetrate the ABM-1 Galosh anti-ballistic missile system surrounding Moscow, by hardening the warhead primary against the system's neutron radiation. The DF-5 missile was thus completed with a 9,000 km range, only enough to cover the USSR but not reach the contiguous US.

China's development of a neutron bomb was influenced by perceptions of a Soviet threat on China's border. A neutron bomb was conceived as a mechanism for blocking or stopping Soviet tank routes over the Sino-Soviet and Sino-Mongolian borders in the event of invasion. In 1980, during a US delegation visit to Shanghai, General Zhang Aiping told Los Alamos National Laboratory Physics Division head George A. Keyworth II that "For you the neutron bomb has no use. But for us ... We need to bowl neutron bombs over the Soviet border." By the late 1980s, China considered the Soviet threat to be significantly reduced.

==== India ====
China has four nuclear-armed neighboring countries, Russia, India, Pakistan, and North Korea. Academic Roderick Lee speculated that the PLAAF's JL-1 air-launched ballistic missile nuclear capability is more likely to be directed at these neighbors rather than the US, especially India, with whom it disputes a border.

== Proliferation and non-proliferation ==
=== Proliferation to Pakistan ===
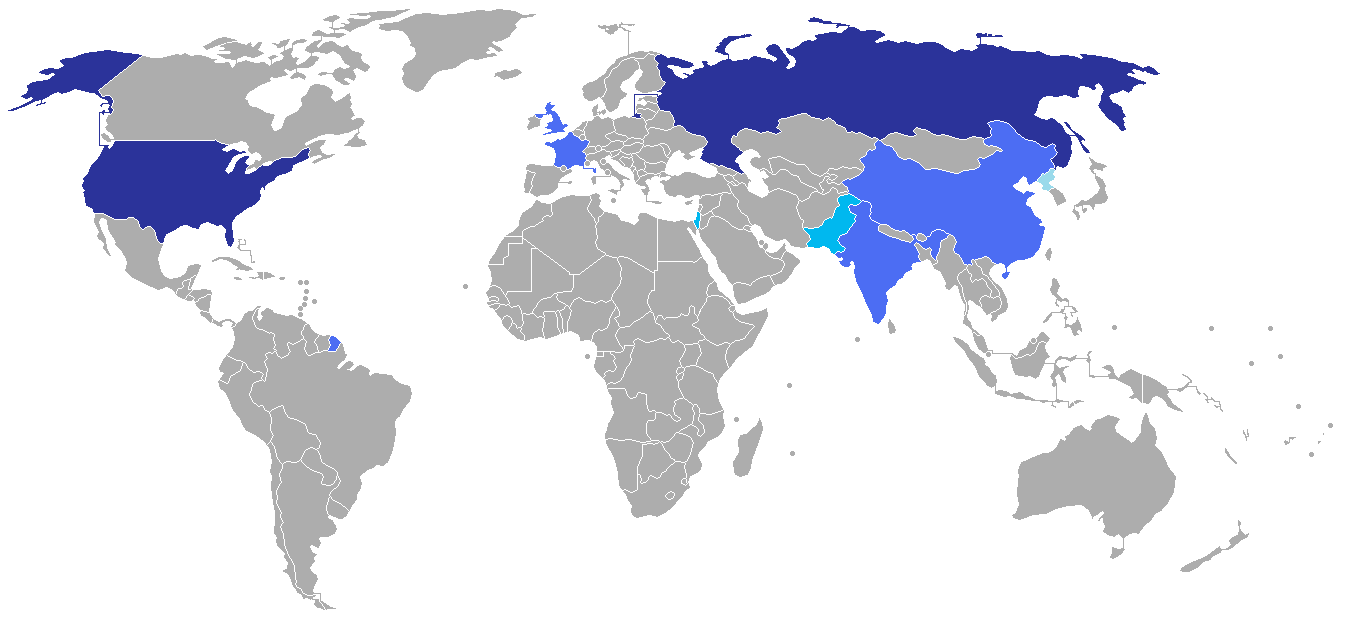
Large stockpile with global range (dark blue), smaller stockpile with global range (medium blue), smaller stockpile with limited range (light blue).

Historically, China has been implicated in the development of the Pakistani nuclear program before China acceded to the NPT in 1992. In the early 1980s, China is believed to have given Pakistan a "package" including uranium enrichment technology, high-enriched uranium, and the design for a compact nuclear weapon. China also received stolen technology that Abdul Qadeer Khan brought back to Pakistan and Pakistan set up a centrifuge plant in China as revealed in his letters which state "(1)You know we had cooperation with China for 15 years. We put up a centrifuge plant at Hanzhong (250km south-west of Xi'an). We sent 135 C-130 plane loads of machines, inverters, valves, flow meters, pressure gauges. Our teams stayed there for weeks to help and their teams stayed here for weeks at a time. Late minister Liu We, V. M. [vice minister] Li Chew, Vice Minister Jiang Shengjie used to visit us. (2)The Chinese gave us drawings of the nuclear weapon, gave us 50 kg enriched uranium, gave us 10 tons of UF6 (natural) and 5 tons of UF6 (3%). Chinese helped PAEC [Pakistan Atomic Energy Commission, the rival organization to the Khan Research Laboratories] in setting up UF6 plant, production reactor for plutonium and reprocessing plant."

=== Non-proliferation ===
Before the 1980s, China viewed arms control and nuclear non-proliferation regimes as mechanisms for Western powers (particularly the US) to restrain China. The Chinese government believed that the NPT "[served] the interests of some States" and only favored the countries that already had nuclear weapons. China considered the NPT an attempt to constrain China, which had only just tested them successfully, rather than countries like the United States or the Soviet Union, which at the time had at least 100 times more nuclear weapons.

Beginning in the 1980s, China's policy and attitude toward nuclear weapons and the NPT had changed under the administration of Deng Xiaoping. Though China continued developing more advanced nuclear technology and weapons, by the 1980s, the country had indicated that it intended on accepting the terms of the NPT; China acceded to the treaty in 1992.

China joined the Nuclear Suppliers Group in 2004, but continued to build nuclear reactors for Pakistan. The NSG Guidelines prohibit new nuclear exports to countries like Pakistan that do not have full-scope IAEA safeguards, but China claimed its exports to Pakistan were "grandfathered" under prior supply arrangements.

China was active in the six-party talks in an effort to end North Korea's nuclear program in the early 2000s. The six-party talks ultimately failed, and in 2006, China voted in favor of sanctioning North Korea for its nuclear program.

The field of nuclear security has become a well-established area of successful US-China cooperation. In 2009, CCP general secretary Hu Jintao called for a bolstered arms control agenda at the United Nations General Assembly, joining United States President Barack Obama's earlier calls for a nuclear-free world. Precipitated by a 2010 Nuclear Security Summit convened by the Obama administration, China and the United States launched a number of initiatives to secure potentially dangerous, Chinese-supplied, nuclear material in countries such as Ghana or Nigeria. In 2017, they converted the GHARR-1 research reactor in Accra, Ghana, a China-supplied Miniature Neutron Source Reactor (MNSR), from highly enriched uranium to using low-enriched uranium, thus no longer directly weapons-usable. China-supplied MNSRs with highly enriched uranium cores remain in Nigeria, Iran, Pakistan, and Syria.

=== Arms control and disarmament ===
China, along with all other nuclear weapon states and all members of NATO, decided not to sign the UN treaty on the Prohibition of Nuclear Weapons, a binding agreement for negotiations for the total elimination of nuclear weapons.

==== Pre-Track 1.5 ====
The U.S.-China Lab-to-Lab Technical Exchange Program ran from 1994 to 1998, holding exchanges in 1996 to 1998.

==== Track 1.5 ====
From 2004 to 2019, China and the United States engaged in a series of "Track 1.5 diplomacy" discussions on the China-US strategic nuclear relationship. This involved one or two annual conferences, involving think tank experts, academics, former officials, and current officials in a private capacity, organized by Chinese and US think tanks, taking place in both Beijing and Hawaii, and sponsored by the US Defense Threat Reduction Agency.

Chinese concerns included the expansion of US national missile defense, the conventional Prompt Global Strike program, the US use of nuclear umbrellas such as those provided to South Korea and Japan. In the early stages, both sides attempted to define basic terms; the Chinese side elaborated that they refuse to name their policy deterrence, referring to it as a "counter-deterrence" that seeks to negate US nuclear coercion. The Chinese side repeatedly pressed the US side to accept or reject the concept of mutual vulnerability to nuclear attack, while the US side sought to maintain strategic ambiguity on the idea.

The US side repeatedly pressed for greater transparency in details of China's nuclear weapons, while the Chinese side maintained non-transparency was a necessary complement to its smaller nuclear forces. US officials also repeatedly pressed for formal Track 1 nuclear discussions with China. Some Chinese experts supported the idea, and others argued for P5 dialogue (the UN permanent five and recognized nuclear-weapons-states: China, France, Russia, the UK, and the US). Chinese leadership was unreceptive to bilateral Track 1 dialogue, based on the much larger US and Russian arsenals. In 2011, Chinese experts and officials argued for a "P5+3" arms control forum, where the P5 would be joined by the nuclear-armed India, Pakistan, and Israel.

US officials obtained greater insight into internal Chinese policy, such as the 2008 debate on whether to keep, abandon, or modify the no-first-use policy, or a consensus by Chinese leaders that a large expansion of China's warhead count would contradict the idea of China's peaceful rise, and therefore problems in the nuclear balance would need to be fixed by qualitatively improving Chinese nuclear forces.

The Chinese side did not hold Beijing meetings from 2017, citing deteriorating US relations. In 2019, the DTRA cancelled the meetings.

==== Post-Track 1.5 ====
China refused to join talks in 2020 between the United States and Russia on extending their bilateral New START nuclear arms reduction treaty, as the Trump administration requested. China's position is that as its nuclear warhead arsenal is a small fraction of the US and Russian arsenals, their inclusion in an arms reduction treaty is unnecessary, and that it will join such talks when both US and Russia has reduced their arsenal to near China's level.

The United States has a classified strategy called Nuclear Employment Guidance, updated by president Joe Biden in March 2024, reported to refocus US nuclear deterrence strategy more toward China.

In April 2025, the China Institute of Atomic Energy announced a deep learning algorithm for differentiating genuine nuclear weapons from decoys, without revealing design details such as geometry, for arms control inspection purposes. The system analyses weapon neutron flux obscured by a wall, and compares it against a generated data set of nuclear components including highly enriched uranium, low enriched uranium, and lead.

On 27 August 2025, China declined US President Donald Trump's proposal to join nuclear disarmament talks with the United States and Russia, calling the idea "neither reasonable nor realistic." While Beijing said it is in favor of disarmament in principle, it has regularly rejected invitations from Washington to join talks with Moscow regarding reducing these countries' nuclear arsenals, arguing that the two nations with the largest stockpiles should take primary responsibility for reductions.

=== Regional reactions ===
Indian sources cite China's development of nuclear weapons as a factor in the decision to initiate India's nuclear weapons program.

President Chiang Kai-shek of the Republic of China (Taiwan) believed, prior to China's first nuclear test in 1964, that such a capability would only be possible from 1967. The shock prompted Taiwan to accelerate development of its nuclear weapons infrastructure.

== Espionage ==
=== By China ===
Information is collected through espionage, reviews of US technical and academic publications and interaction with US scientists. China tasks a large number of individuals to collect small pieces of information (which are collated and analyzed), and individual agents can more easily escape suspicion. US government personnel suspect that China's intelligence-gathering efforts directed towards the development of modern nuclear weapons are focused on the Los Alamos National Laboratory (LANL), where nuclear weapons were first developed in the 1940s, Lawrence Livermore, Sandia and Oak Ridge National Laboratories. China is known to have stolen classified information on the W-56 Minuteman II ICBM, the W-62 Minuteman III ICBM, the W-70 Lance short-range ballistic missile (SRBM), the W-76 Trident C-4 submarine-launched ballistic missile (SLBM), the W-78 Minuteman III Mark 12A ICBM, the W-87 Peacekeeper ICBM and the W-88 Trident D-5 SLBM and weapon-design concepts and features.

In 2016, the US Justice Department charged China General Nuclear Power Group (CGN) with stealing nuclear secrets from the United States. The Guardian reported: "According to the US Department of Justice, the FBI has discovered evidence that China General Nuclear Power (CGN) has been engaged in a conspiracy to steal US nuclear secrets stretching back almost two decades. Both CGN and one of the corporation's senior advisers, Szuhsiung Ho, have been charged with conspiring to help the Chinese government develop nuclear material in a manner that is in clear breach of US law."

A 2022 report by Strider Technologies, a strategic intelligence firm, found that over the past two decades, China has recruited at least 154 Chinese scientists from LANL to support China's development of military technologies that pose threats to US national security.

=== Against China ===
==== India and the United States ====
India–United States espionage on Nanda Devi was a series of attempts by the United States Central Intelligence Agency (CIA) and the Indian Intelligence Bureau (IB) to spy on ballistic missile testing being conducted at Lop Nur in Xinjiang, China. The agencies cooperated in October 1965 in a failed attempt to install a SNAP-19C plutonium-238 radioisotope thermoelectric generator-powered (RTG-powered) remote sensing station on the peak of Nanda Devi in the Garhwal Himalayas to gather signals intelligence via telemetry from missiles during their tests.

The mission was aborted during a strong blizzard, and the generator was lost. Three recovery attempts failed, leading to fears of radioactive contamination of the Ganges or repurposing for a dirty bomb. Another CIA RTG-powered mountaintop device installed from spring 1967 to 1968 melted down into the ice, blocking its signal-gathering. A third device was successful from 1973 but quickly made obsolete by reconnaissance satellites.

==== Taiwan and the United States ====
After China conducted its third nuclear test, Project 596L, in May 1966, the United States was eager to obtain information on the Chinese nuclear program. A CIA program, code named Tabasco, developed a sensor pod that could be dropped into the Taklamakan Desert, near Lop Nur nuclear test site. The pod would deploy an antenna after landing and radio back data to US SIGINT at Shu Lin Kou Air Station in Taiwan. After a year of testing, the pod was ready. Two pilots of the Black Cat Squadron were trained in the dropping of the pod. On 7 May 1967, a ROCAF U-2 took off from Takhli Royal Thai Air Force Base with a sensor pod under each wing. The aircraft released the pods at the target, near Lop Nur, but no data were received. China conducted its first full-scale thermonuclear test Project 639 on 17 June 1967. Black Cat Squadron flew a second U-2 mission near Lop Nur on 31 August 1967, carrying a recorder and an interrogator to contact the pods, but was unsuccessful.

This was followed by operation Heavy Tea of the Republic of China Air Force's Black Bat Squadron. The CIA again planned to deploy two sensor pallets to monitor Lop Nur. A crew was trained in the US to fly the C-130 Hercules. The crew of 12 took off from Takhli Royal Thai Air Force Base in an unmarked USAF C-130E on 17 May 1969. Flying for 13 hours at low altitude in the dark, the sensor pallets were dropped by parachute near Anxi in Gansu province, and the aircraft returned to Takhli. The sensors uploaded data to a US intelligence satellite for six months, before their batteries died. China conducted two nuclear tests, on 22 September 1969 and 29 September 1969 in this period. Another mission to the area was planned as operation Golden Whip, but was called off in 1970.

In total, five U-2s of the Black Cat Squadron were shot down between 1959 and 1974, and at least three Lockheed P-2 Neptunes of the Black Bat Squadron were shot down in the early 1960s.

== Research ==
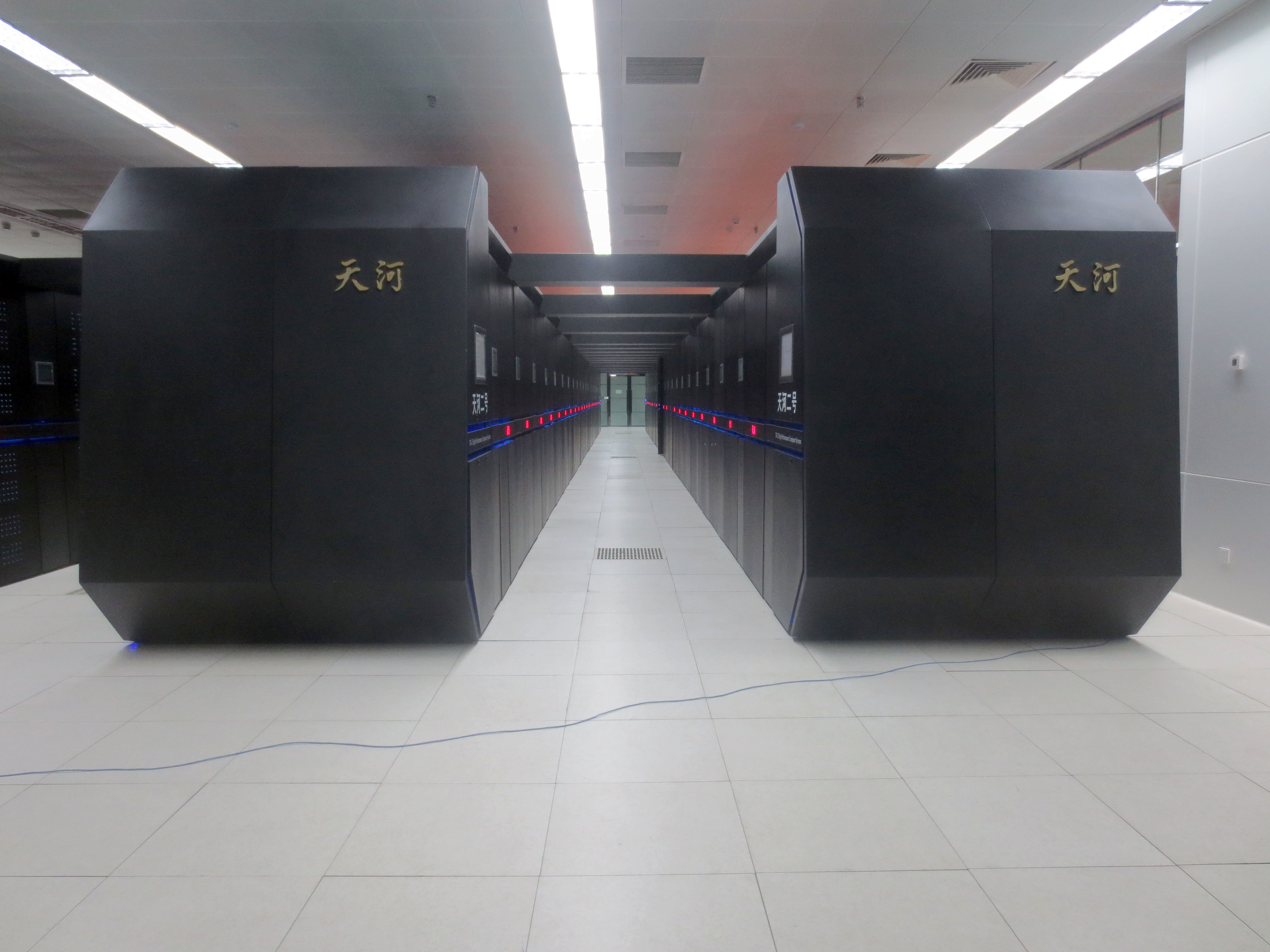
The US government placed the National Supercomputer Center in Guangzhou on its Entity List in 2015 after it suspected the Tianhe-2 was being used for "nuclear activities".

China's nuclear weapons development proceeded rapidly despite the country's weak technological base at the inception of its program. It reached a level of weapon design comparable to the United States and the Soviet Union in substantially fewer nuclear tests. Development milestones in China's nuclear weapons development include: its first atomic bomb (1964), its first hydrogen bomb (1966), its neutron bomb (late 1970s-1980s), the gas-boosted primary for second-generation warheads (1980s), aspheric gas-boosted primary for more advanced second-generation warheads (1990s), and the new secondary for the second-generation warheads (1980s-1990s).

Chinese scientists describe the describe the successful test of an aerial nuclear bomb (1965), missile warhead development (1966), and the hydrogen bomb (1967) as the "triple jump" that followed its first testing of a nuclear device.

The China Academy of Engineering Physics (CAEP) is China's nuclear weapons laboratory. It is headquartered in Mianyang with offices and institutes elsewhere including Beijing, Shanghai, and Chengdu.

In 2007, the US Central Intelligence Agency blocked the publication of a 506-page book titled "Inside China's Nuclear Weapons Program", by former Los Alamos National Laboratory intelligence specialist Danny B. Stillman. While the Department of Energy had approved publication of the entire book, the US Intelligence Community declared twenty-three passages, comprising fifteen percent of the book, as classified information. The book "engaged in extensive discussions with Chinese scientists, government officials, and nuclear weapons designers". Former Los Alamos director Harold Agnew suggested the US government may have been "just embarrassed".

=== Computation ===
Deng Jiaxian led the theoretical group which conducted the Nine Calculations, a milestone of China's nuclear weapons program which confirmed a key weapons design parameter (the central pressure needed to reach supercriticality in an implosion-type atomic bomb). Chinese narratives highlight the significance of the Nine Calculations, an achievement which followed the Soviet Union's withdrawal of technical expertise.

In the lead up to the Project 639 thermonuclear test, during late 1965 Chinese nuclear physicists led by Yu Min relied on a combination of computer numerical simulation and calculations by hand, to develop a Teller-Ulam design analogue. 119 and J501 computers were used.

Like other adherents to the Comprehensive Nuclear-Test-Ban Treaty, China uses supercomputers to verify nuclear weapons designs via simulating nuclear explosions. In 1997, the United States placed CAEP on the Entity List, banning computer chip exports to the organization. The National Supercomputer Center in Guangzhou was added to the Entity List in 2015 after suspicion that the Intel chip-based Tianhe-2 was used for nuclear simulation. During the controversy surrounding the Cox Report which alleged Chinese espionage of US weapon designs, some sources argued that instead the Chinese acquisition of supercomputers was the reason for China's technical catchup to the US. Conversely, former Los Alamos National Laboratory director Harold Agnew argued American scientists reached their technical level without supercomputers and Chinese scientists could have done the same.

=== Inertial confinement fusion ===
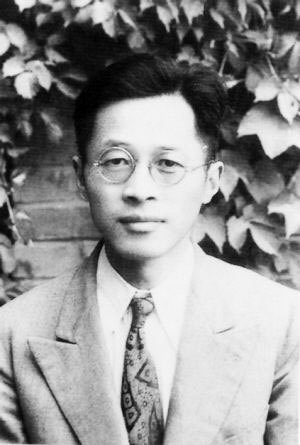
Wang Ganchang, scientific leader of China's ICF development

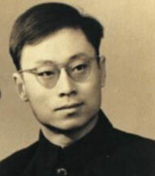
Yu Min, designer of China's hydrogen bomb and contributor to ICF development

Like other nuclear-armed countries, China has an inertial confinement fusion (ICF) program. Some Western analysts and Chinese journalists believe this is in part to study the detonation of thermonuclear weapons. China's primary series of ICF experiments are the Shengguang (神光, Shén Guāng, 'Divine Light') facilities. With involvement from China's "father of the hydrogen bomb" Yu Min and "father of optical engineering" Wang Daheng, Wang Ganchang led the development of China's ICF program, proposing concepts since 1964. Small-scale experiments at the Shanghai Institute of Optics and Fine Mechanics in 1971 achieved the first detection of neutrons from deuterium-deuterium thermonuclear fusion in laser implosions.

Wang Ganchang proposed the Shengguang-I laser concept since 1980, under the name "Laser-12", and PLA General Zhang Aiping allegedly gave it the name "Shengguang". The facility was built in Shanghai from 1983, and from 1989 carried out pellet implosions yielding 5 million neutrons in direct drive and 10,000 in indirect drive i.e. with a hohlraum. It was shut down in 1994.

In 1993, China established the 863 Program for ICF, and began constructing Shengguang-II in Shanghai in 1994, which operated from 2000.

CAEP operates the Laser Fusion Research Center in Mianyang. Projects there include the Xingguang-III, Shengguang-III, and Shengguang-IV lasers. The Shengguang-IV laser has been under construction in Mianyang since 2021 or earlier, and is stated to provide 1.5 megajoules to targets. A 2025 satellite imagery analysis identified a laser facility in Mianyang, about 50% larger than the US National Ignition Facility.

== Current and upcoming delivery systems ==
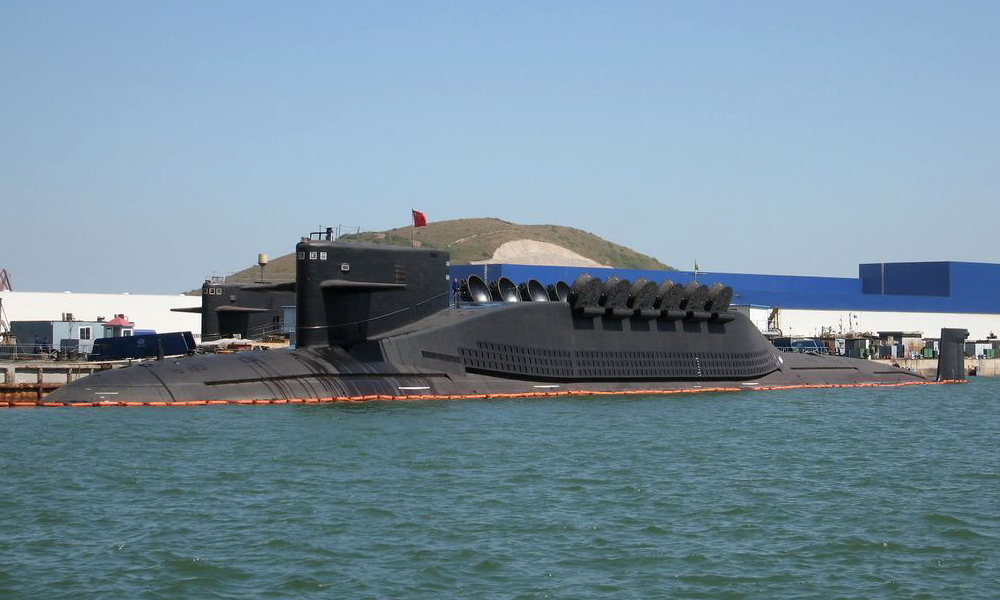
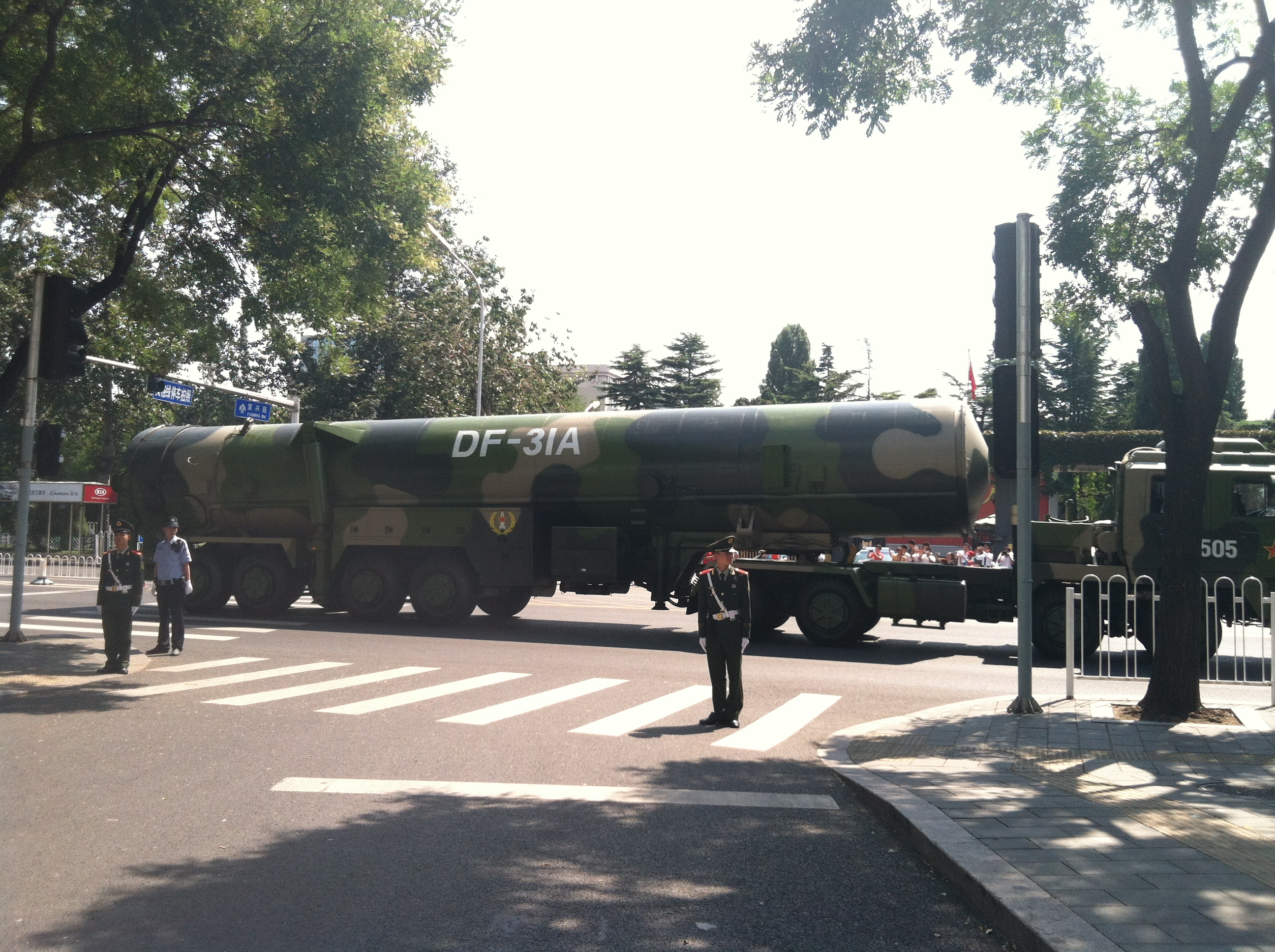
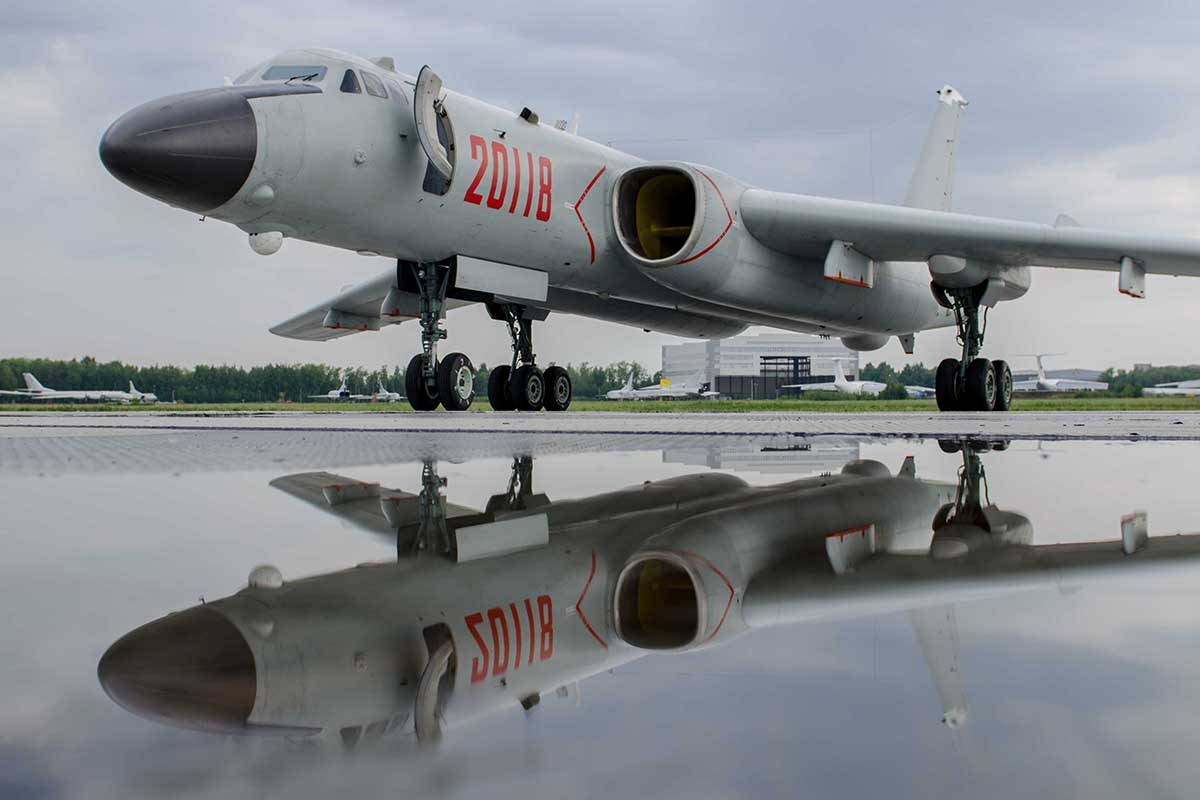
China's nuclear triad – a Type 094-class SSBN, a DF-31 ICBM and a Xi'an H-6 strategic bomber

Since 2020, China has operated a nuclear triad. Of its 620 warheads, it is estimated 509 are assigned to Dongfeng ballistic missiles, 409 of which are intercontinental-range, while 100 are DF-26 intermediate-ranged missiles. Another 72 warheads are to Julang-3 submarine-launched ballistic missiles on Type 094 submarines, and 20 to Jinglei-1 air-launched ballistic missiles on Xi'an H-6N bombers. A remaining 19 warheads await assignment.

It is believed China deploys two types of warhead with yields of 425 and 95 kilotons.

=== Land-based ===
The PRC makes use of the country's large geographic area as a strategy to protect its nuclear forces against a theoretical first strike against the country. Nuclear missile units are dispersed and missile brigades are not located in the same places as the bases that command them. The nuclear forces are commanded by six missile bases located in Liaoning, Anhui, Yunnan, Hunan, Henan, and Gansu. Most of the nuclear forces are commanded by the three missile bases in the interior of the country (in Hunan, Henan, and Gansu).

China stores many of its missiles in huge tunnel complexes; US Representative Michael Turner referring to 2009 Chinese media reports said "This network of tunnels could be in excess of 5,000 kilometers (3,110 miles), and is used to transport nuclear weapons and forces." A People's Liberation Army newspaper calls this tunnel system an underground Great Wall of China. The PRC has traditionally focused more on its land-based nuclear weapons than other delivery systems as they are more readily controllable by the country's political leadership.

==== DF-5 ====
The Dongfeng 5 (simplified Chinese: 东风-5; traditional Chinese: 東風-5; pinyin: Dōng Fēng Wǔ; lit. 'East Wind 5') or DF-5 is a Chinese second-generation two stage, silo-launched, liquid-propelled intercontinental ballistic missile. The most recent variant of the missile, the DF-5C, was first displayed at the 2025 China Victory Day Parade and is estimated to have a range of approximately 20,000 kilometres (12,000 mi) with the ability to carry up to 10 multiple independently targetable reentry vehicles (MIRVs).

The DF-5 had its first flight in 1971 and was in operational service 10 years later. One of the limitations of the missile is that it takes between 30 and 60 minutes to load with liquid fuel (UDMH) and NTO oxidizer. The missile was also used as the basis for the Long March 2 family of launch vehicles.

As of 2026, DF-5s in service are estimated at six DF-5A missiles assigned six warheads, and twelve DF-5B missiles assigned 60 warheads in MIRV configuration. It is unknown if the DF-5C is deployed. The DF-5B warhead, at 4.5 megatons, is one of the largest nuclear weapons still in service worldwide.

==== DF-26 ====
The Dongfeng-26 or DF-26 (simplified Chinese: 东风-26; traditional Chinese: 東風-26; lit. 'East Wind-26'; NATO reporting name: CH-SS-18) is an intermediate-range ballistic missile of the Dongfeng series deployed by the People's Liberation Army Rocket Force and produced by the China Aerospace Science and Technology Corporation (CASC).

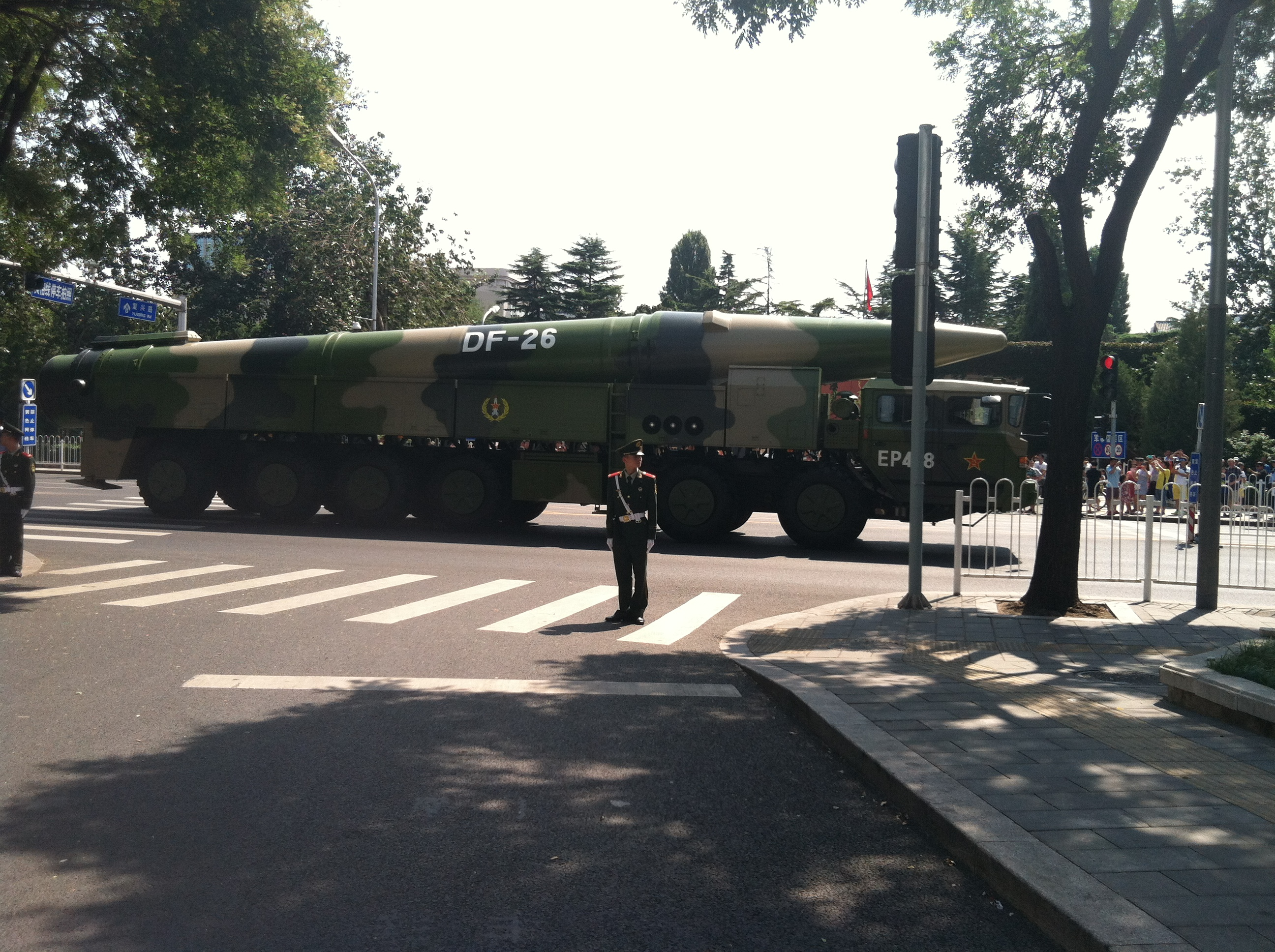
DF-26 intermediate-range ballistic missile on display. Unlike most Chinese nuclear weapons, it is dual-capable; brigades are trained to employ both conventional and nuclear warheads on the missile.

==== DF-27/CSS-10 ====
The DF-27 (CH-SS-X-24) is an intermediate-range ballistic missile (IRBM), equipped with a hypersonic glide vehicle (HGV) warhead. The ballistic missile was in development as of 2021, with a range of 5,000 km to 8,000 km.

==== DF-31/CSS-10 ====
The Dong Feng 31 (or CSS-10) is a medium-range, three stage, solid propellant intercontinental ballistic missile developed by the People's Republic of China. It is a land-based variant of the submarine-launched JL-2.

==== DF-41/CSS-X-10 ====
The DF-41 (or CSS-X-10) is an intercontinental ballistic missile believed to be operational. It is designed to carry multiple independently targetable reentry vehicles (MIRV), delivering multiple nuclear warheads.

==== DF-61 ====
The Dongfeng-61 (simplified Chinese: 东风-61; traditional Chinese: 東風-61; lit. 'East Wind-61', DF-61) is an intercontinental ballistic missile developed by the People’s Republic of China. It is likely nuclear-armed and may be a variant or successor to the DF-41.

=== Sea-based ===
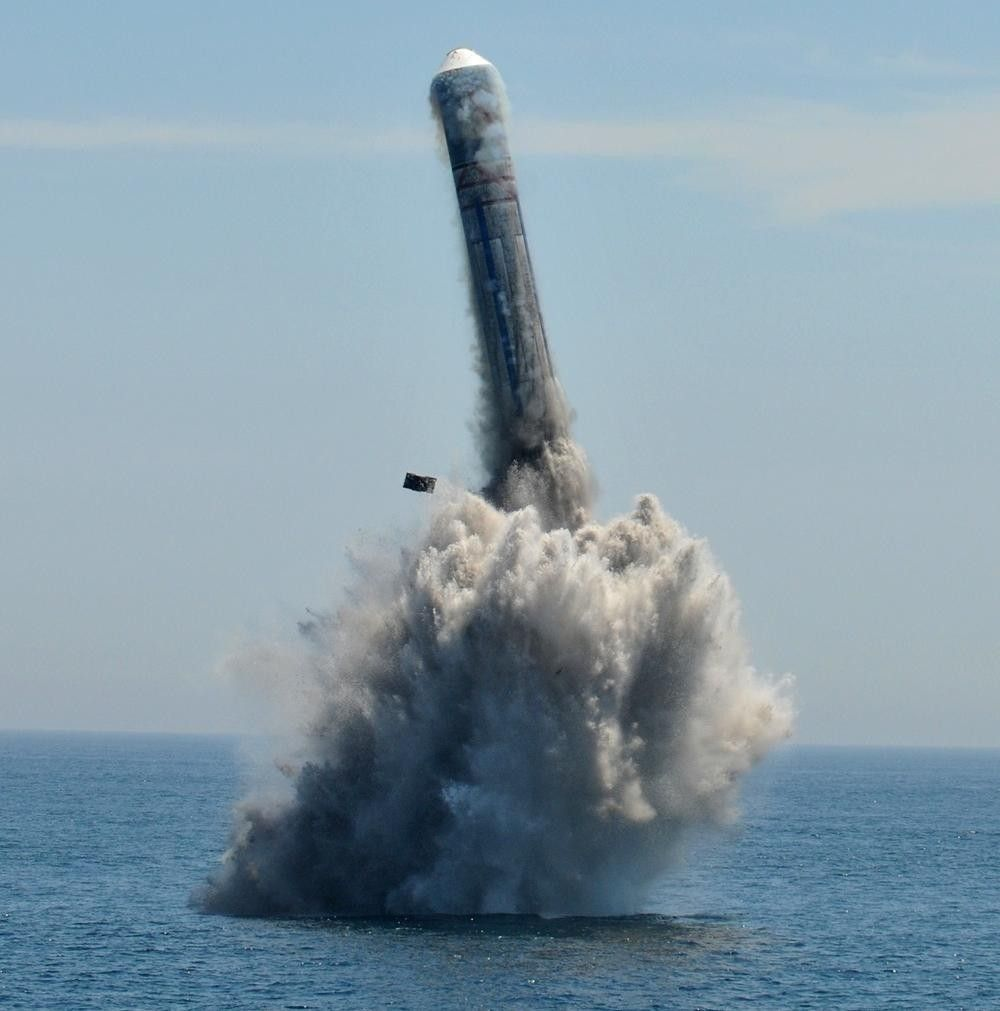
A Julang-2 submarine-launched ballistic missile test.

As of 2025, the People's Liberation Army Navy operates six Type 094 ballistic missile submarine. It is capable of carrying 12 JL-3 ballistic missiles, with a range of over 9,000 km. These are based at Longpo Naval Base in Hainan. The Federation of American Scientists estimates that due to range limitations, to target the northwestern United States the submarines would need to sail much further north, probably to the Bohai Sea. China is also developing the larger Type 096 submarine, claimed to be able to carry up to 24 JL-3 ballistic missiles each. It is believed to provide China with its first survivable undersea second strike capability.

=== Air-based ===
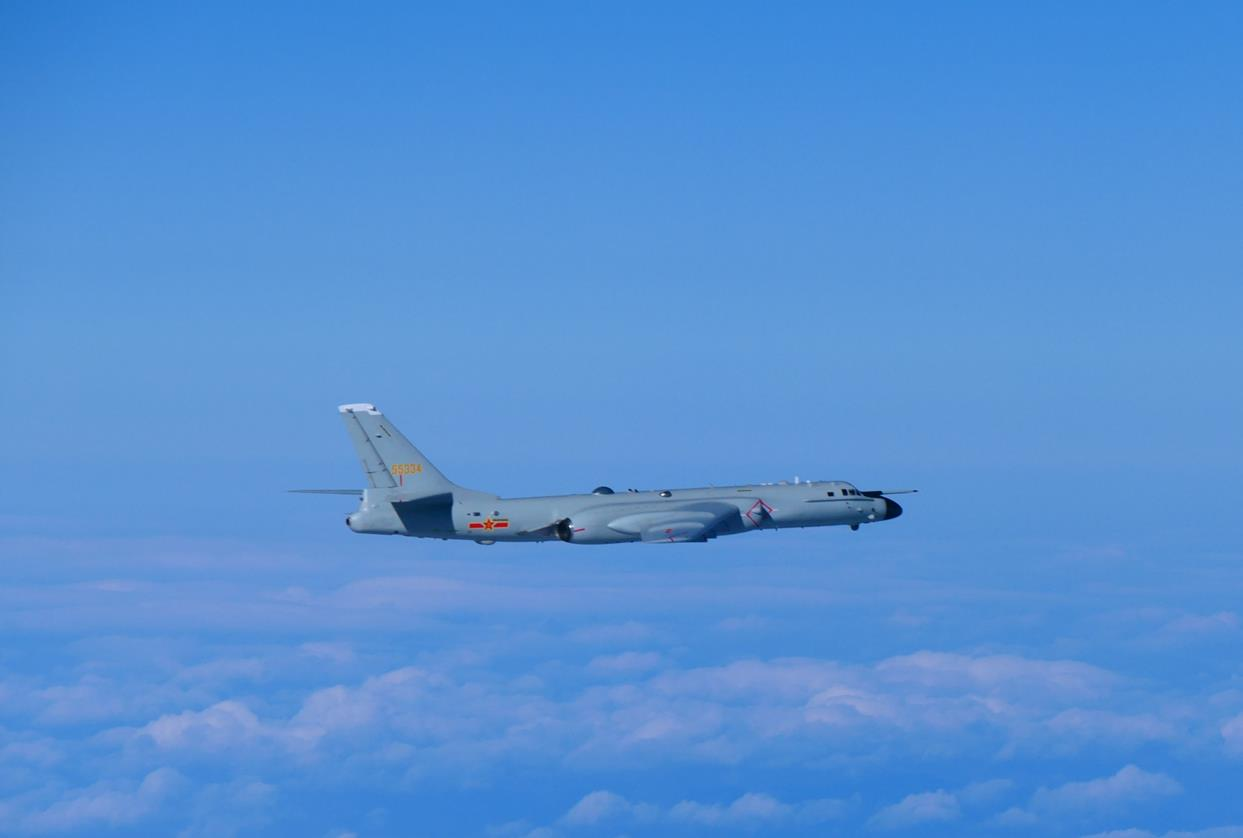
China maintains a nuclear-capable variant of its Xi'an H-6 bomber, the H-6N, assigned to carry the Jinglei-1 air-launched ballistic missile.

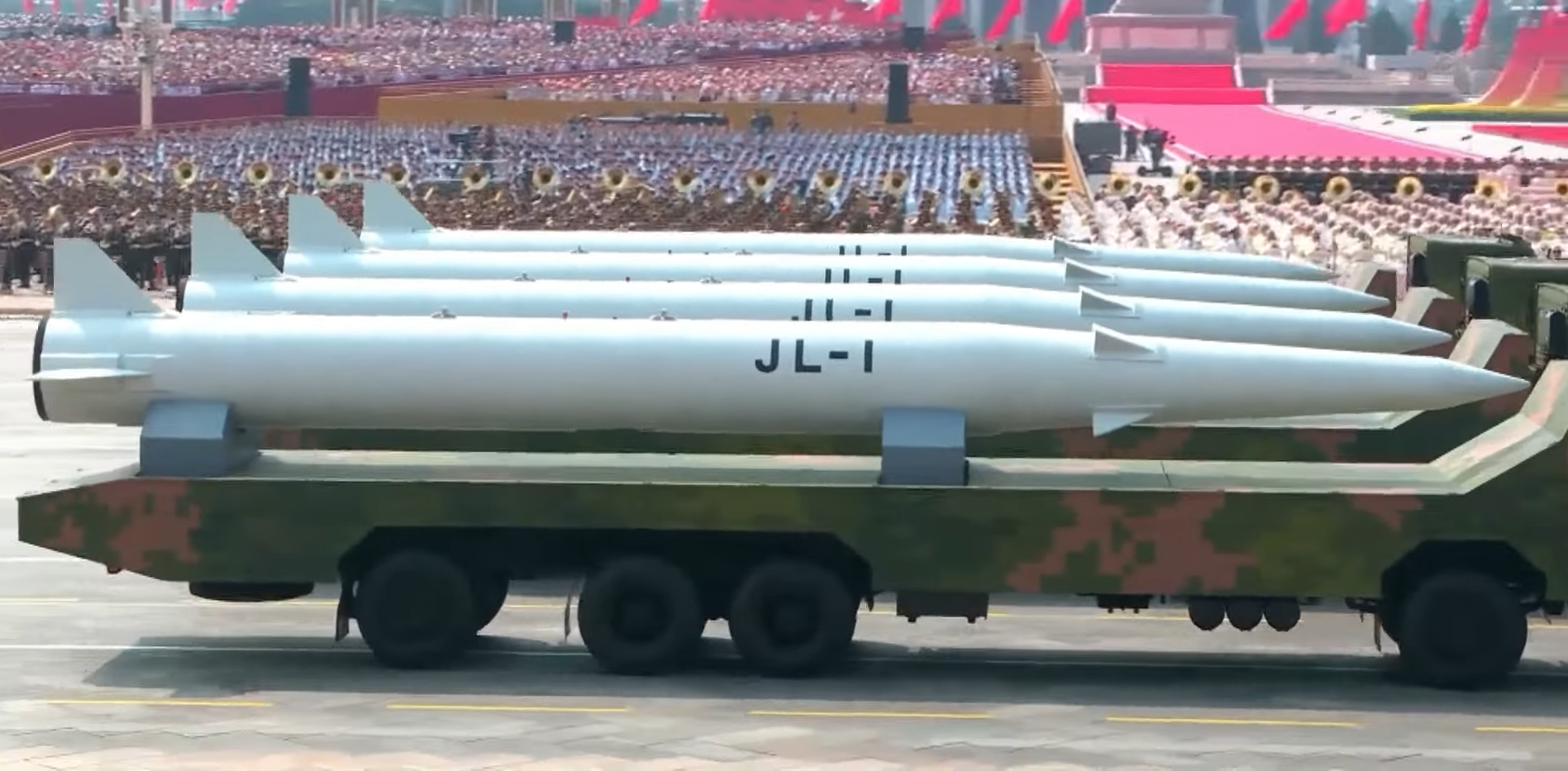
The Jinglei-1, China's only nuclear-armed air-launched ballistic missile, at the 2025 China Victory Day Parade.

China currently assigns approximately 20 Xi'an H-6N bomber aircraft to carrying the Jinglei-1 air-launched ballistic missile, NATO designation CH-AS-X-13.

China is alleged to be testing the Xian H-20 as a stealth technology bomber, succeeding the H-6N and as an analogue to the American Northrop B-2 Spirit and Northrop Grumman B-21 Raider. It may carry a new nuclear-armed air-launched cruise missile.

=== Fractional orbital bombardment system ===
In 2021, following tests by the China Academy of Launch Vehicle Technology, United States Secretary of the Air Force Frank Kendall III stated that China was developing and testing a fractional orbital bombardment system (FOBS). In May 2025, the US Defense Intelligence Agency released a report stating that China will have nuclear-capable missiles operating as part of a FOBS by 2035.

== Former delivery systems ==
=== Land-based ===
==== Long-range ballistic missiles ====
The Chinese categorize long-range ballistic missiles as ones with a range between 3000 and 8000 km.

China "keeps most of its warheads at a central storage facility in the Qinling mountain range, though some are kept at smaller regional storage facilities."

===== DF-4/CSS-3 =====
The Dong Feng 4 or DF-4 (also known as the CSS-3) is a long-range two-stage Chinese intermediate-range ballistic missile with liquid fuel (nitric acid/UDMH). It was thought to be deployed in limited numbers in underground silos beginning in 1980. The DF-4 has a takeoff thrust of 1,224.00 kN, a takeoff weight of 82,000 kg, a diameter of 2.25 m, a length of 28.05 m, and a fin span of 2.74 m. It is equipped with a 2,190 kg nuclear warhead with 3,300 kt explosive yield, and its range is 5,500 km.

==== Medium-range ballistic missiles ====
Approximately 55% of China's missiles are in the medium-range category, targeted at regional theater targets.

===== DF-3A =====
The DF-3A (NATO: CSS-2) is a Chinese liquid-fueled, single-stage, nuclear-capable intermediate-range ballistic missile. It entered service with the People's Liberation Army Rocket Force in 1971, and its units were fully converted to the DF-21 by 2014. The missile was used as the basis for China's first launch vehicle, the Long March 1.

===== DF-21 =====
The Dongfeng 21 (DF-21; NATO reporting name CSS-5 - Dong-Feng (simplified Chinese: 东风; traditional Chinese: 東風; lit. 'East Wind') is a two-stage, solid-fuel, single-warhead medium-range ballistic missile (MRBM) developed by China's Changfeng Mechanics and Electronics Technology Academy. A part of the Dongfeng missile family, the DF-21's development started in the late 1960s, and it was completed around 1985–86, but not deployed until 1991. It was developed from the JL-1 submarine-launched missile, and is China's first solid-fuel land-based missile. The U.S. Department of Defense in 2008 estimated that China had 60-80 missiles and 60 launchers; approximately 10-11 missiles can be built annually.

The DF-21A, China's first road-mobile medium range ballistics missile, was first deployed in 1991.

==== Strategic cruise missiles ====
===== DH-10 =====
The DongHai 10 (DH-10) is a cruise missile developed in the People's Republic of China. According to Jane's Defence Weekly, the DH-10 is a second-generation land-attack cruise missile (LACM), with over 4,000 km range, integrated inertial navigation system, GPS, terrain contour mapping system, and digital scene-matching terminal-homing system. The missile is estimated to have a circular error probable (CEP) of 10 meters.

===== CJ-10 =====
The ChangJian-10 (Long Sword 10) is a cruise missile developed by China, based on the Hongniao missile family. It has a range of 2,200 km. Although not confirmed, it is suspected that the CJ-10 could carry nuclear warheads. An air-launched variant (named CJ-20) has also been developed.

===== HongNiao missile family =====
There are three missiles in this family: the HN-1, HN-2, and HN-3. Reportedly based on the Kh-SD/65 missiles, the Hongniao (or Red Bird) missiles are some of the first nuclear-capable cruise missiles in China. The HN-1 has a range of 600 km, the HN-2 has a range of 1,800 km, and the HN-3 has a range of 3,000 km.

===== ChangFeng missile family =====
There are two missiles in the Chang Feng (or Long Wind) family: CF-1 and CF-2. These are the first domestically developed long-range cruise missiles for China. The CF-1 has a range of 400 km while the CF-2 has a range of 800 km. Both variants can carry a 10 kt nuclear warhead.

==== Tactical cruise missiles ====
===== CJ-10 =====
The CJ-10 (simplified Chinese: 长剑-10; traditional Chinese: 長劍-10; pinyin: Cháng Jiàn 10; lit. 'long sword 10') is a second-generation Chinese land-attack cruise missile. It is derived from the Kh-55 missile. It is reportedly manufactured by the China Aerospace Science and Industry Corporation Third Academy and the China Haiying Electro-Mechanical Technology Academy.

===== YJ-62 =====
The YJ-62 (Chinese: 鹰击-62; pinyin: yingji-62; lit. 'eagle strike 62') is a Chinese subsonic land-attack and anti-ship cruise missile. It is manufactured by the China Aerospace Science and Industry Corporation Third Academy.

=== Sea-based ===
The Type 092 (Chinese designation: 09-II; NATO reporting name: Xia class) submarine is the first nuclear-powered ballistic missile submarine (SSBN) deployed by the People's Liberation Army Navy Submarine Force (PLANSF). Boat 406 was the only member of the class.

=== Air-based ===
China's bomber force consists mostly of Chinese-made versions of Soviet aircraft. The People's Liberation Army Air Force has 120 H-6s (a variant of the Tupolev Tu-16). These bombers were outfitted to carry nuclear as well as conventional weapons. While the H-6 fleet is aging, it is not as old as the American B-52 Stratofortress. The Chinese have also produced the Xian JH-7 Flying Leopard fighter-bomber with a range and payload exceeding the F-111 (currently about 80 are in service) which were capable of delivering a nuclear strike. China has also bought the advanced Sukhoi Su-30 from Russia; currently, about 100 Su-30s (MKK and MK2 variants) have been purchased by China. In 2006, the Federation of American Scientists considered the Su-30MKK "a logical choice" for a regional tactical nuclear strike capability but it was not credited with one by any sources.

== Early warning ==
China's early warning system is believed to be focused on launches from the United States. It provides relatively short warning times, due to needing to differentiate from a US attack targeted at Russia, and limited facilities.

According to the 2024 China Military Power Report, China has had at least three early warning satellites in orbit since 2022. In 2025, the International Institute for Strategic Studies (IISS) stated that these three satellites were named Huoyan-1. Encyclopedia Astronautica reported prior to 2020 that seven satellites of the Shijian-11 series were believed to have infrared sensors, with a potential missile tracking/early warning usage, while in 2025 IISS reported that the Shijian-11 series had a signals intelligence role and not an early warning one.

The satellites are complimented by four large ground-based phased array early warning radars in Xinjiang, Shandong, Heilongjiang, and Zhejiang. Early warning has been developed since the 2010s, believed to be connected to China's shift towards a launch on warning capability. A 2024 US Air University report stated China has constructed at least seven Large Phased Array Radars (LPARs), previously operated by the Second Artillery and PLAAF, but now mostly consolidated under the People's Liberation Army Aerospace Force. This included the four above locations, as well as the first LPAR site, in Xuanhua, and sites in Gansu and Jiangsu. The report argued the radars have a dual use in space domain awareness i.e. satellite tracking, and that the Jiangsu LPAR, operational since 2022, may be tasked to observe aerial activities of the Republic of Korea Air Force and United States Forces Korea.

== Air and missile defense ==
According to the 2024 China Military Power Report, China has a multi-layered missile defense system:

For the outer layer, China is developing kinetic kill vehicle technology for an anti-ballistic missile mid-course interceptor similar to the US Ground-Based Midcourse Defense.

For the second layer of "ultra-long-range air defense", China is interested in developing surface-to-air missiles with ranges similar to the 1,600 km (990 mi) of the DF-17, which can be guided via reconnaissance satellites.

For the final layer of "strategic long-range air defense", China operates battalions of the indigenous HQ-19 and Russian S-400 anti-air missiles, capable of terminal phase intercept, as well as older HQ-9 and S-300 systems.

== Significance of Taiwan ==
Military analysts have pointed out that unification with Taiwan would have geostrategic significance for China, allowing it to break out of the first island chain. The first island chain is considered a strategic military barrier to accessing the wider Pacific Ocean and the relative shallowness of waters to the west of the first island chain has important implications for submarine detection. In particular, control over Taiwan and its deeper eastern waters would provide the People's Liberation Army Navy's ballistic missile submarines with less detectable access to the wider Pacific where they could serve as an important component of a credible second-strike capability.

== Other weapons of mass destruction ==
China also developed chemical and biological weapons during the Cold War. The Federation of American Scientists noted a 1997 passage from People's Liberation Army officers Captain Wang Qiang and Colonel Yang Qingzhen which referenced Pandora's box, writing that "chemical weapons could be the fuse to ignite a nuclear war" as they are both "mass casualty weapons".

== In popular culture ==
In Nuclear Holocausts: Atomic War in Fiction, author Paul Brians argues that China is portrayed with a "near-suicidal recklessness" in English-language nuclear war fiction.

International relations scholar Chenchen Zhang notes Chinese social media analyses make a comparison of the dark forest hypothesis to China's nuclear deterrence. The hypothesis originates from Liu Cixin's The Dark Forest, in the Remembrance of Earth's Past novel series. Character Luo Ji attempts to defend Earth from the planet Trisolaris, by threatening mutual assured destruction via revealing the locations of both planets to other potentially hostile alien civilizations. Users compare this to the nuclear strategy of Mao Zedong toward the United States.

In the Fallout video game series, a war between the United States and China results in a global nuclear exchange in 2077, creating a post-apocalyptic setting. Co-creator Tim Cain suggested an idea during development was a Chinese nuclear first strike in response to an American biological weapons program.

== See also ==
- List of nuclear weapons tests of China
- Chinese space program
