= DF-61 =

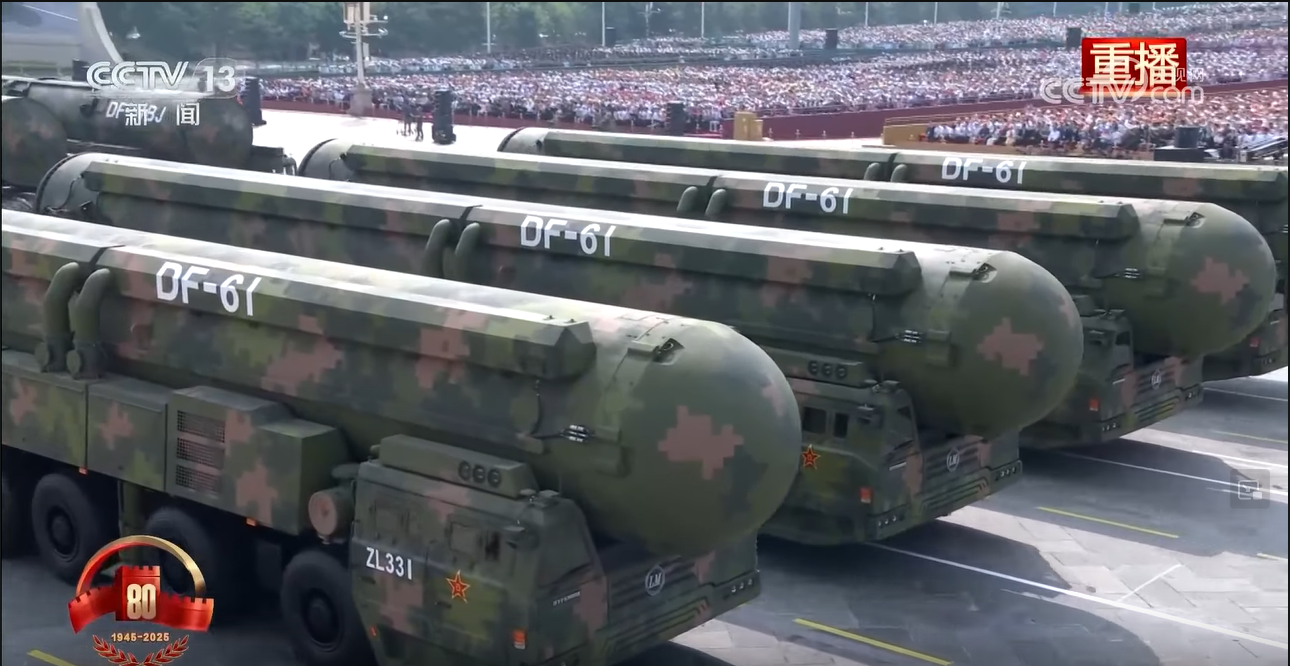
- DF-61 missile at the 2025 China Victory Day Parade
- Type: Intercontinental ballistic missile
- Place of origin: China

Service history
- In service: 2025–present
- Used by: People's Liberation Army Rocket Force

Specifications
- Warhead: MIRV
- Engine: Solid-fuel rocket
- Operational range: ~12,100–18,000 kilometres (7,500–11,200 mi)
- Launch platform: Transporter erector launcher

The Dongfeng-61 (simplified Chinese: 东风-61; traditional Chinese: 東風-61; lit. 'East Wind-61', DF-61) is an intercontinental ballistic missile developed by the People’s Republic of China. It is likely nuclear-armed and may be a variant or successor to the DF-41.

== Description ==
The DF-61 is a road-mobile missile and is likely nuclear-armed. The transporter erector launcher is seemingly identical to the one used by the DF-41; the DF-61 may be a variant or successor to the DF-41. Reported ranges include 7,500 miles (12,100 km) - similar to the DF-41- and 18,000 kilometres (11,000 mi)

== History ==
The missile made its first official public appearance during the 2025 China Victory Day Parade as part of the nuclear missile section. A Federation of American Scientists article described the appearance of the DF-61 as a "surprise" since it seemed similar to the DF-41, a missile already deployed at the time.

== Earlier "DF-61" program ==
The "DF-61" designation was used by a tactical nuclear missile development program from 1976-1977. It was a response to North Korea's interest to acquire 600 km range missiles from China, although no agreement was made. Development began as a counter to the Soviet Union. The decision not to emphasize tactical weapons in the nuclear weapons program probably ended development.

== Sources ==
- Zhang, Hui (2025). The Untold Story of China's Nuclear Weapon Development and Testing: A Technical History. Belfer Center Studies in International Security. Cambridge, Massachusetts: The MIT Press. ISBN 978-0-262-05182-8.

== See also ==
- China and weapons of mass destruction
