= China Military Power Report =

Congressionally-mandated report

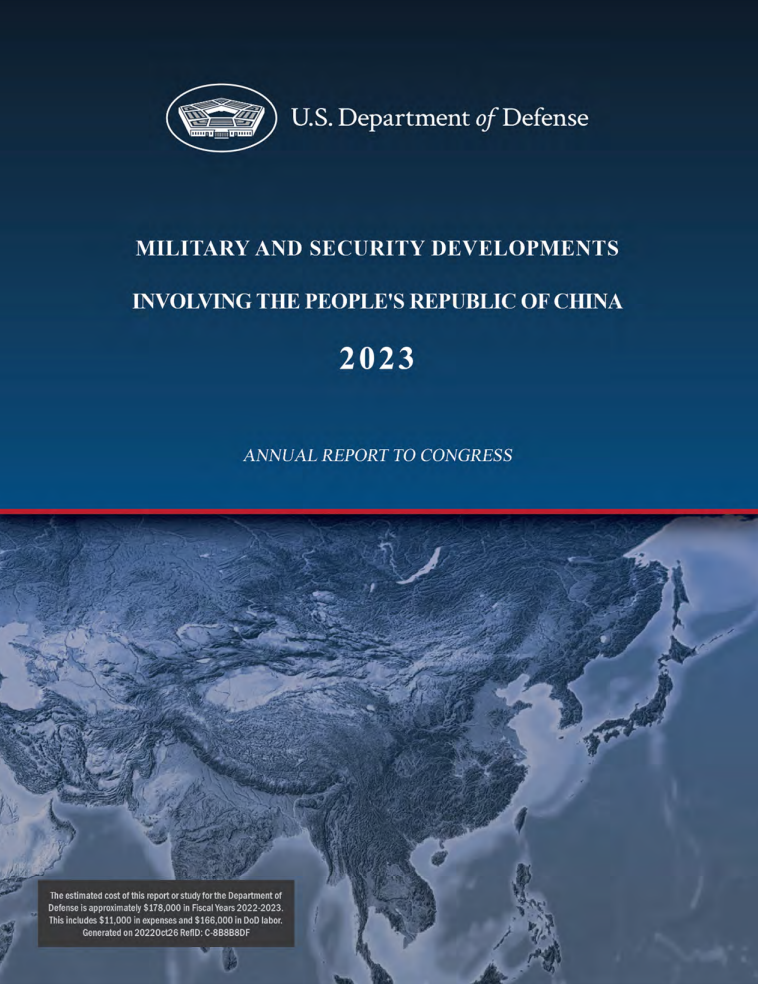
The cover of the 2023 China Military Power Report

The China Military Power Report (abbr. CMPR), officially the Military and Security Developments Involving the People's Republic of China, is an annual report produced by the United States Department of Defense (DoD) for the United States Congress that provides estimates, forecasts, and analysis of the People's Republic of China (PRC) military and security developments for the previous year. An unclassified form of the congressionally mandated report is published publicly. In 2022, the DoD's Assistant Secretary of Defense for Indo-Pacific Security Affairs described it as "the most authoritative, unclassified articulation of PRC capability and strategy" available in the US.

The CMPR, submitted by the Secretary of Defense on behalf of the Department of Defense, is separate from and not be confused with the similarly-named publication by the Defense Intelligence Agency (DIA) 2019 China Military Power, which, along with its sister threat reports on the militaries of North Korea, Iran, and Russia, was intended to continue the legacy of DIA's annual Soviet Military Power publication which ended after the fall of the Soviet Union in 1991.

== Legal mandate ==
=== Origins ===
The National Defense Authorization Act (NDAA) for Fiscal Year (FY) 2000, which authorizes the military and defense activities of the Department of Defense, and segments of the Department of Energy, was passed by the 106th Congress (Senate Resolution 1059) and signed into law by then-President Bill Clinton on 5 October 1999, becoming Public Law Number 106–65.

The first division of each NDAA (Division A - Department of Defense Authorizations) includes Title XII (Matters Relating to Other Nations) in which Congress exercises its legislative authorities to set conditions on the activities of the Defense Department with regard to foreign nations. In the FY2000 NDAA, Title XII included four subtitles (lettered A–D) concerning matters related to the People's Republic of China, Balkans, NATO and other allies, and "other matters", respectively, the last of which included single sections on Haiti, Korea, the United Nations, and Libya.

Subtitle A (Matters Related to the People's Republic of China) comprised two sections. The first, Section 1201, prohibited the Secretary of Defense from authorizing any military-to-military exchanges with the armed forces of the PRC or their representatives. The latter, Section 1202 (Annual Report on Military Power of the People's Republic of China), established the congressional mandate for the annual production of the China Military Power Report. The first of three paragraphs (Annual Report) describes the report to be submitted:

Not later than March 1 each year, the Secretary of Defense shall submit to the specified congressional committees a report, in both classified and unclassified form, on the current and future military strategy of the People’s Republic of China. The report shall address the current and probable future course of military-technological development on the People’s Liberation Army and the tenets and probable development of Chinese grand strategy, security strategy, and military strategy, and of military organizations and operational concepts, through the next 20 years.

The second paragraph ("Matters to be Included") lists specific topics for which the report "shall include analyses and forecasts of:"

1. The goals of Chinese grand strategy, security strategy, and military strategy
2. Trends in Chinese strategy that would be designed to establish the People's Republic of China as the leading political power in the Asia-Pacific region and as a political and military presence in other regions of the world
3. The security situation in the Taiwan Strait
4. Chinese strategy regarding Taiwan
5. The size, location, and capabilities of Chinese strategic, land, sea, and air forces, including a detailed analysis of those forces facing Taiwan
6. Developments in Chinese military doctrine, focusing on (but not limited to) efforts to exploit a transformation in military affairs or to conduct preemptive strikes
7. Efforts, including technology transfers and espionage, by the People's Republic of China to develop, acquire, or gain access to information, communication, space and other advanced technologies that would enhance military capabilities
8. An assessment of any challenges during the preceding year to the deterrent forces of the Republic of China on Taiwan, consistent with the commitments made by the United States in the Taiwan Relations Act.

Where the first paragraph, which establishes the annual report, states that the report shall be submitted "to the specified congressional committees", the third and final paragraph (Specified Congressional Committees) of Section 1202 lists these committees to whom the Secretary of Defense is mandated to provide a copy of the report:

- Senate Armed Services Committee (SASC)
- Senate Foreign Relations Committee (SFRC)
- House Armed Services Committee (HASC)
- House Foreign Affairs Committee (HFAC), then known as the House International Relations Committee.

=== Amendment ===
On 28 October 2009, the Fiscal Year 2010 National Defense Authorization Act (FY2010 NDAA) was signed into law as Public Law Number 111-84, where Section 1246 amended the establishing provisions of FY2000 NDAA with the following changes.

- Shifted the focus of the report from current and future military strategy of the PRC to military and security developments involving the PRC
- Added military training as a specific matter to be included
- Removing the specific focus on a PRC transformation in military affairs or efforts to conduct preemptive strikes
- Added that the report should address US-China engagement and cooperation on security matters, military-to-military contact

== Layout ==
Though chapter names and order have been adjusted over time, each China Military Power Report follows a similar structure. In order, these sections are:

- Preface
- Executive Summary
- Understanding the PRC's Strategy
- People's Liberation Army (PLA) Forces, Capabilities, and Power Projection (formerly Force Modernization Goals and Trends)
- Operational Structure and Activities on China's Periphery (formerly Force Modernization for a Taiwan Contingency)
- The PLA's Growing Presence (begun in 2020)
- Resources and Technology for Force Modernization
- US-PRC Defense Contacts and Exchanges in the Previous Year
- Special Topics (varying)
- Appendices
- Acronyms & Abbreviations

=== Introductory elements ===
Prior to 2020, CMPRs have led with an executive summary encapsulating the key findings of the entire report in just a few pages. Prior to 2019, executive summaries were followed by an 'Annual Update' chapter which would provide a brief synopsis of significant developments in Chinese military and security advances during the previous year. In 2019, the annual update chapter was discontinued, and in 2020, a preface was added before the executive summary in an effort to frame the context of the report amid the evolution of the Chinese military and national security strategy. Also in 2020, the executive summary was restructured to mirror each section and subsection of the report's main body and present key takeaways and conclusions from each.

=== Main body ===
The first chapter of each CMPR's body is "Understanding the PRC's Strategy" ("China's Strategy" prior to 2023). The chapter details PRC national strategy, foreign policy, economic policy, belt-and-road initiative, military-civil fusion (MCF) development strategy, and defense policy and military strategy.

The chapter "PLA Forces, Capabilities, and Power Projection", known as "Missions and Tasks of China's Armed Forces in a New Era" in 2021 and "Force Modernization Goals and Trends" in each year prior, provide extensive estimates of PLA forces' size, composition, disposition, technologies including for paramilitary and militia forces, special operations forces, joint training, space and counterspace training, nuclear forces, CBRN forces.

The chapter "Operational Structure and Activities on China's Periphery", titled specifically as the "Force Modernization for a Taiwan Contingency" prior to 2019, details the regionally-aligned commands of the PLA and their training and operations in support of force projection into neighboring nations, the South China Sea, and Taiwan — towards which CMPRs present a detailed assessment of Chinese readiness for an anticipated invasion and capabilities of the Taiwanese military to resist.

The chapter "The PLA's Growing Global Presence", not present in CMPRs prior to 2020, details growing relationships with other nations and integration of the PLA with China's foreign policy goals, with sections on the PRC's global military activities, overseas military presence, foreign military cooperation, overseas basing and access, influence operations, influence actors, cognitive domain operations, energy strategy, and specifically PLA's arctic presence.

The chapter "Resources and Technology for Force Modernization" (the word "Technology" was added in 2020) discusses military expenditure trends, personnel costs, defense industry, missile and space industry, naval and shipbuilding industry, armaments industry, aviation industry, foreign arms acquisition, industrial defense espionage, arms exports, and the PRC's desires to dominate emerging technology industries including artificial intelligence.

The final chapter of each CMPR's main body is a detailed accounting and analysis of US-PRC defense contacts and exchanges in the previous year, both for their contribution to understanding PRC strategy and to fulfill the Defense Department's obligation to provide congress with an annual report on such exchanges, according to Section 1201 of the FY 2000 NDAA. This section provides a specific listing of high-level contacts and exchanges, recurring exchanges, confidence-building measures and academic exchanges, and military-to-military contacts, including whether the contact or exchange actually occurred, was refused, cancelled, or ignored.

=== Special topics ===
Following the main body of each CMPR report are one to five special topics, which vary year-to-year and last two to three pages. In the 2024 CMPR, three special topics were presented:

- Impacts of Corruption on the PLA
- Political Training in the PLA
- PRC Views of Comprehensive National Power

=== Closing elements ===
Each CMPR closes with a varying number of appendices called for by earlier sections. In recent years' reports, these have included "PRC and Taiwan Forces Data", "Selected Bilateral and Multilateral Exercises in 2022", and "China's Top Crude Oil Suppliers in 2020". The last of these appendices is often a listing of acronyms and abbreviations.
