= Comparison of ICBMs =

This is a comparison list of intercontinental ballistic missiles developed by various countries.

== ICBMs by country ==
Legend for launch system status in below table: Operational Under development Inactive Unknown status

S No.	Name	Operator	Manufacturer	Max range	Missile mass	Payload	Status	First flight	MIRV	Mobility	Accuracy (CEP)
1	RS-28 Sarmat	Russia	State Rocket Center Makeyev	18,000 km	208,100 kg	10,000 kg, 10x 1 Mt	Active	2018	Yes	Silo	N/A
2	BZhRK Barguzin	Russia	Votkinsk	12,600 km	45,000–50,000 kg	N/A	Inactive	N/A	Yes	Railroad	N/A
3	R-36M2 Voevoda (Note: This is world's heaviest ICBM with a throw-weight of 8,800 kg.)	USSR	Yuzhny Machine-Building Plant	11,000 km (or 16,000 km with a single warhead)	211,400 kg	10x 800 kt / 8730 kg	Unknown	1986	Yes	Silo	220 m
4	UR-100N UTTKh	USSR	Khrunichev Machine-Building Plant	10,000 km	105,600 kg	6x 550 kt / 4350 kg	Active (Note: Only in mod 4 version with 1 warhead.)	1977	Yes (Note: Active only in mod 4 version with 1 warhead.)	Silo	350–500m
5	RT-2PM Topol	USSR	Votkinsk Machine Building Plant	10,500 km	45,100 kg	800 kt	Active	1985	No	Road-mobile TEL	200–900 m
6	RT-2PM2 Topol-M	Russia	Votkinsk Machine Building Plant	11,000 km	47,200 kg	800 kt	Active	1994	No	Silo, road-mobile TEL	200 m
7	RS-24	Russia	Votkinsk Machine Building Plant	12,000 km	49,000 kg	3–4 300 kt	Active	2007	Yes	Silo, road-mobile TEL	150 m
8	R-29R	Russia	State Rocket Center Makeyev	6,500 km	35,300 kg	3x 500kt	Active	1978	Yes	Delta III submarine	900 m
9	R-29RK	Russia	State Rocket Center Makayev	6,500 km	34,388 kg	7x 100kt	Inactive	N/A	Yes	Delta III submarine	900m
10	R-29RL	Russia	State Rocket Center Makeyev	9,000 km	35,300 kg	1x 450kt	Inactive	N/A	No	Delta III submarine	900m
11	R-29RM	Russia	Krasnoyarsk Machine-Building Plant	8,300 km	40,300 kg	4x 200kt	Inactive	1982	Yes	Delta IV submarine	550m
12	R-29RMU Sineva	Russia	Krasnoyarsk Machine-Building Plant	11,547 km	40 300 kg	4x 500kt	Active	2004	Yes (4)	Delta IV submarine	250–500m
13	R-29RMU2 Layner	Russia	Krasnoyarsk Machine-Building Plant	11,000 km+	40 000 kg	4x 500kt	Active	2011	Yes (4)	Delta IV submarine	250m
14	RSM-56 Bulava	Russia	Votkinsk Plant State Production Association	8000–10000 km	36,800 kg	6x 150 kt	Active	2005	Yes	Borei-class submarine	350 m
15	R-7 Semyorka (Note: The world's first tested intercontinental ballistic missile.)	USSR	Soviet Academy of Sciences	12,000 km	280,000 kg	2.9 Mt	Inactive	1959	No	Launch pad	5,000 m
16	R-16	USSR	Khartron	11,000 km	141,000 kg	5 Mt	Inactive	1961	No	Silo	2,700 m
17	R-9 Desna	USSR	NPO Energomash; Khartron	11,000 km	80,400 kg	2.3 Mt	Inactive	1961	No	Silo	2,000 m
18	UR-100	USSR	Khrunichev Machine-Building Plant	10,600 km	41,400 kg	1 Mt	Inactive	1966	No	Silo	N/A
19	RT-2	USSR		10,186 km	34,000 kg	600 kt	Inactive	1968	No	Silo	
20	MR-UR-100 Sotka	USSR	Yuzhny Machine-Building Plant	10,250 km	71,200 kg	4x 0.4 Mt	Inactive	1971	Yes	Silo	
21	RT-23 Molodets	USSR	Yuzhnoye Design Bureau	10,450 km	104,500 kg	10x 550 kT	Inactive	1986	Yes (10 )	Silo, Railroad	150–250 m
22	R-29	USSR	State Rocket Center Makayev	7,700 km	32,800 kg		Inactive	1969	No	Delta I submarine	
23	R-39 Rif	USSR	Zlatoust Machine-Building Plant	8,300 km	84,000 kg	10x 100–200 kT	Inactive	1983	Yes	Typhoon-class submarine	N/A
24	Minuteman III	US	Boeing	13,000 km	35,300 kg	3x 300 kt	Active	1970	Yes	Silo	200 m
25	Trident	US	Lockheed Martin Space Systems	7,400 km	33,142 kg	8x 100 kt	Inactive	1977	Yes	Ohio-class submarine	380 m <
26	Atlas (Note: The world's first operational intercontinental ballistic missile.)	US	Consolidated Vultee Aircraft (Convair)	14,500 km	117,900 kg		Inactive	1959	No		
27	Titan I	US	Glenn L. Martin Company	10,200 km	105,140 kg	3.75 Mt	Inactive	1959	No	Silo	
28	Titan II	US	Glenn L. Martin Company	15,000 km	154,000 kg	9 Mt	Inactive	1962	No	Silo	
29	Minuteman I	US	Boeing	8,900 km	29,000 kg	1.2 Mt	Inactive	1961	No	Silo	
30	Minuteman II	US	Boeing	10,200 km	33,000 kg	1.2 Mt	Inactive	1965	No	Silo	
31	LGM-118 Peacekeeper	US	Boeing, Martin Marietta, TRW,	14,000 km	96,750 kg	10x 300 kt	Inactive	1983	Yes	Silo	90 m
32	Midgetman	US	Martin Marietta	11,000 km	13,600 kg	475 kt	Inactive	1992	No	Small ICBM Hard Mobile Launcher	90 m
33	Trident II	United Kingdom and United States	Lockheed Martin Space Systems	11,300 km+	58,500 kg	8x 475 kt or 14x 100 kt	Active	1987	Yes	Ohio-class and Vanguard-class submarines	90–120 m
34	M4	France	EADS SPACE Transportation	5,000 km	36,000 kg	6x 150 kt	Inactive	1985	Yes	Le Redoutable-class submarine	
35	M45	France	Aérospatiale/EADS SPACE Transportation	6,000 km	35,000 kg	6x 110 kt	Active	1986	Yes	Triomphant-class submarine	350 m
36	M51.1	France	EADS Astrium Space Transportation	10,000 km (or more)	52,000 kg	6 to 10x 100 kt	Active	2006	Yes	Triomphant-class submarine	150–200m
37	M51.2	France	EADS Astrium Space Transportation	10,000 km (or more)	52,000 kg	6 to 10x 150kt (new Tête nucléaire océanique)	Under development		Yes	Triomphant-class submarine	
38	DF-5	China	China Academy of Launch Vehicle Technology	12,000 km	183,000 kg	4 Mt	Unknown	1971	No	Silo	1,000 m
39	DF-5A	China	China Academy of Launch Vehicle Technology	15,000 km	183,000 kg	5 Mt	Active	1983	No	Silo	1,000 m
40	DF-5B	China	China Academy of Launch Vehicle Technology	15,000 km	183,000 kg		Active	2015	Yes	Silo	800m
40	DF-5C	China	China Academy of Launch Vehicle Technology	15,000 km	183,000 kg	10x 1 Mt	Active	2015	Yes	Silo	800m
41	DF-4	China	Factory 211 (Capital Astronautics Co.)	7,000 km	82,000 kg	3.3 Mt	Inactive	1975	No	Silo	1,500 m
41	DF-4A	China	Factory 211 (Capital Astronautics Co.)	7,000 km	82,000 kg	3x 1 Mt	Inactive	1975	Yes	Silo	1,500 m
42	DF-31	China	Academy of Rocket Motors Technology (ARMT)	8,000 km	42,000 kg	1 Mt	Active	1999 (Reported)	No	Road-mobile TEL	150m
43	DF-31A	China	Academy of Rocket Motors Technology (ARMT)	12,000 km	42,000 kg	3x 20/90/150 kt	Active	2007	Yes	Road-mobile TEL	150m
44	DF-41	China	China Academy of Launch Vehicle Technology	12,000 km–15,000 km	80 000 kg	10x 1 Mt	Active	2012	Yes	Road-mobile TEL/ Rail-mobile	100–150 m
45	JL-2	China	Factory 307 (Nanjing Dawn Group)	~7200 km	42,000 kg	1x 1 Mt or 3x 20/90/150 kt	Active	2001 (Believed)	Yes	Type 094 Jin-class submarine	500 m
46	JL-3	China	Factory 307 (Nanjing Dawn Group)	9000–12,000 km			Under development		Yes	Type 096 submarineType 094A (speculated)	
48	Agni-VI	India	Defence Research and Development Organisation	11,000–12,000 km	55,000–70,000 kg		Under development	2022	Yes	Road mobile TEL, Rail Mobile	
49	Surya	India	Defence Research and Development Organisation	12,000–16,000 km	55,000–70,000 kg		Unknown	N/A	Yes	Road mobile TEL, Rail Mobile	
50	KN-08	North Korea		1,500–12,000 km (Speculated)			Unknown	2012	No	Silo	
51	Hwasong-14	North Korea		6,700–10,000 km	33,800 kg	500 kg	Under development	2017	No	Road-mobile TEL	N/A
52	Hwasong-15	North Korea		13,000 km	72,000 kg	1,000 kg	Under development	2017	Maybe	Road-mobile TEL	N/A
53	Jericho III	Israel	Israel Aerospace Industries	4,800–11,500 km (Speculated)	30,000 kg	750 kg single or MIRVed (Suspected)	Unknown	2008	Yes	Road-mobile TEL	50m at 1000km
54	LGM-35 Sentinel	United States	Northrop Grumman				Under Development		Yes	Silo	

== See also ==
- Intercontinental ballistic missile
- List of ICBMs
- List of missiles
