= List of intercontinental ballistic missiles =

This is a list of intercontinental ballistic missiles developed by various countries.

== Russia ==
Specific types of Russian ICBMs include:

=== Active ===
- RS-28 Sarmat (2023) / SS-X-30 Satan 2 (HGV-equipped)
- RSM-56 Bulava (2018) MIRV-equipped/SS-NX-30
- RS-24 Yars (2011): MIRV-equipped.
- R-29RMU Sineva MIRV-equipped/SS-N-23 Sineva mode 2
- R-29RMU2 Layner (2014) MIRV-equipped/SS-N-23 Liner
- R-36M2 Voevoda / SS-18 Satan
- UR-100N 15A30 / SS-19 Stiletto
- RT-2PM Topol / 15Zh58 / SS-25 Sickle
- RT-2PM2 Topol-M / SS-27 / RS12M1 / RS12M2
- R-29R SS-N-18 Stingray
- R-29RK SS-N-18 Stingray Mod 2
- R-29RL MIRV-equipped/SS-N-18 Stingray Mod 3
- R-29RM MIRV-equipped/SS-N-23 Skiff

=== Inactive ===
- R-7 Semyorka / 8K71 / SS-6 Sapwood: The Sputnik variant of this rocket was first used to launch Sputnik 1 in October 1957. Derivatives are still in use today, primarily as the launcher for the Soyuz and the Progress spacecraft launches to the International Space Station.
- R-16 SS-7 Saddler
- R-9 Desna / SS-8 Sasin
- R-36 SS-9 Scarp. Russia's first MIRVed missile
- UR-100 8K84 / SS-11 Sego
- RT-2 8K98 / SS-13 Savage
- MR-UR-100 Sotka / 15A15/ SS-17 Spanker
- RT-23 Molodets / SS-24 Scalpel
- R-29 SS-N-8 Sawfly
- R-39 Rif SS-N-20 Sturgeon

== India ==
Active

Agni V: India currently has one active intercontinental ballistic missile (ICBM), the Agni-V. With an estimated range of around 5,000–8,000 km, Agni-V represents India’s entry into the ICBM class and forms a key component of its strategic deterrence posture. The missile is a three-stage, solid-fuel, road-mobile system capable of carrying MRIV nuclear warheads. Developed by the Defence Research and Development Organisation (DRDO), Agni-V has been inducted into service with the Strategic Forces Command following a series of successful developmental and user trials.

Under Development

- Surya missile: Intercontinental-ballistic missile, surface-based, solid and liquid propellant ballistic missile, 12,000–16,000 km (speculated) with MIRV capability (Under development).
- Agni-VI: Road and Rail mobile ICBM, silo-based, 8,000–12,000 km with MIRVs (under development).
- K-5 SLBM: submarine launched, 5,000–6,000 km (under development).
- K-6 SLBM: submarine launched, 8,000–12,000 km with MIRVs (under development).

== United States ==
=== Active ===
- LGM-30 Minuteman-III (1970): Only land-based ICBM in service in the United States. The first MIRV (Multiple Independently Targetable Reentry Vehicle) missile.
- UGM-133 Trident II (1990): Submarine-launched.

=== Inactive ===
- Atlas (SM-65, CGM-16): Former ICBM launched from silo, the rocket was modified and used in 1962-1963 for four crewed Mercury-Atlas flights, and was used, along with the Agena or Centaur upper stages, as a medium-lift satellite and interplanetary probe launcher for NASA and the USAF. Original design, with "balloon tanks" and "1.5 staging," has since been retired and replaced with the Atlas V, which has an internal structure similar to the Titan ICBM, but using conventional propellants.
- Titan I (SM-68, HGM-25A): Based in underground launch complexes. Used LOX/RP-1 propellants like Atlas, but stored in conventional tanks.
- Titan II (SM-68B, LGM-25C): Former hypergolic-fueled ICBM launched from silo, the rocket was used in 1965-1966 for ten crewed Gemini flights and its two-stage core was modified into the heavy-lifting Titan III and Titan IV rockets. All Titan II, III, and IV models have since been retired.
- Minuteman I (SM-80, LGM-30A/B, HSM-80)
- Minuteman II (LGM-30F)
- LGM-118 Peacekeeper / MX (LGM-118A): silo-based, with rail basing tested; decommissioned in September 2005
- MGM-134 Midgetman: road mobile launcher; has never been operational, cancelled in 1992

=== In Development ===
- LGM-35 Sentinel, which is in development by Northrop Grumman in 2020, scheduled to be phased in starting 2030 to replace the Minuteman III.

== China ==
DF (Dong Feng or East Wind) are land-based ICBMs.

- DF-5, DF-5A and DF-5B (CSS-4): silo based, 12,000-15,000 km, MIRV - 3 to 8
- DF-41 (CSS-X-10): 2017, road-mobile, maximum 12,000-15,000 km
- JL-2 SLBM: 2005, submarine launched, 7,400-8,000 km
- DF-31 (CSS-9): 2006, road mobile, 7,250-8,000 km
- DF-4 (CSS-3): 1975, silo-based, 5,500 km
- DF-31B: 2015, road-mobile, unknown range and MIRV capability

== France ==
France's proximity to the Soviet Union made only Intermediate-range ballistic missiles and Submarine-launched ballistic missiles necessary for strategic deterrence, while smaller warheads have been used as free-fall bombs and on airborne cruise missiles or short-range ballistic missiles (Pluton and Hadès).

=== Active ===
France now only deploys submarine-launched ballistic missiles, with all land based IRBMs decommissioned in September 1996. The French Air Force and French Navy retain aircraft-carried nuclear-tipped cruise missiles (ASMP-A) to fulfill the pre-strategic role (tactical-sized weapons used as "ultimate warning" before launching an all-out strategic strike).

- M51 SLBM (three variants : M51.1 from 2010; M51.2 from 2015; M51.3 projected from 2025 onwards)

=== Inactive ===
- S2 IRBM
- S3 IRBM
- M4 SLBM
- M45 SLBM

== Israel ==
- Jericho III is a road mobile ICBM which entered service in 2008, a three-stage solid propellant missile with a payload of 1,000 to 1,300 kg with a range of 4,800 to 11,500 km (2,982 to 7,180 miles). In November 2011, Israel successfully test fired an ICBM believed to be an upgraded version of the Jericho III.

== North Korea ==
- Hwasong-20 (under development)
- Hwasong-19
- Hwasong-18
- Hwasong-17
- Hwasong-15
- Hwasong-14 is active
- Hwasong-13 (KN-08)

== Intercontinental-range submarine-launched ballistic missiles ==
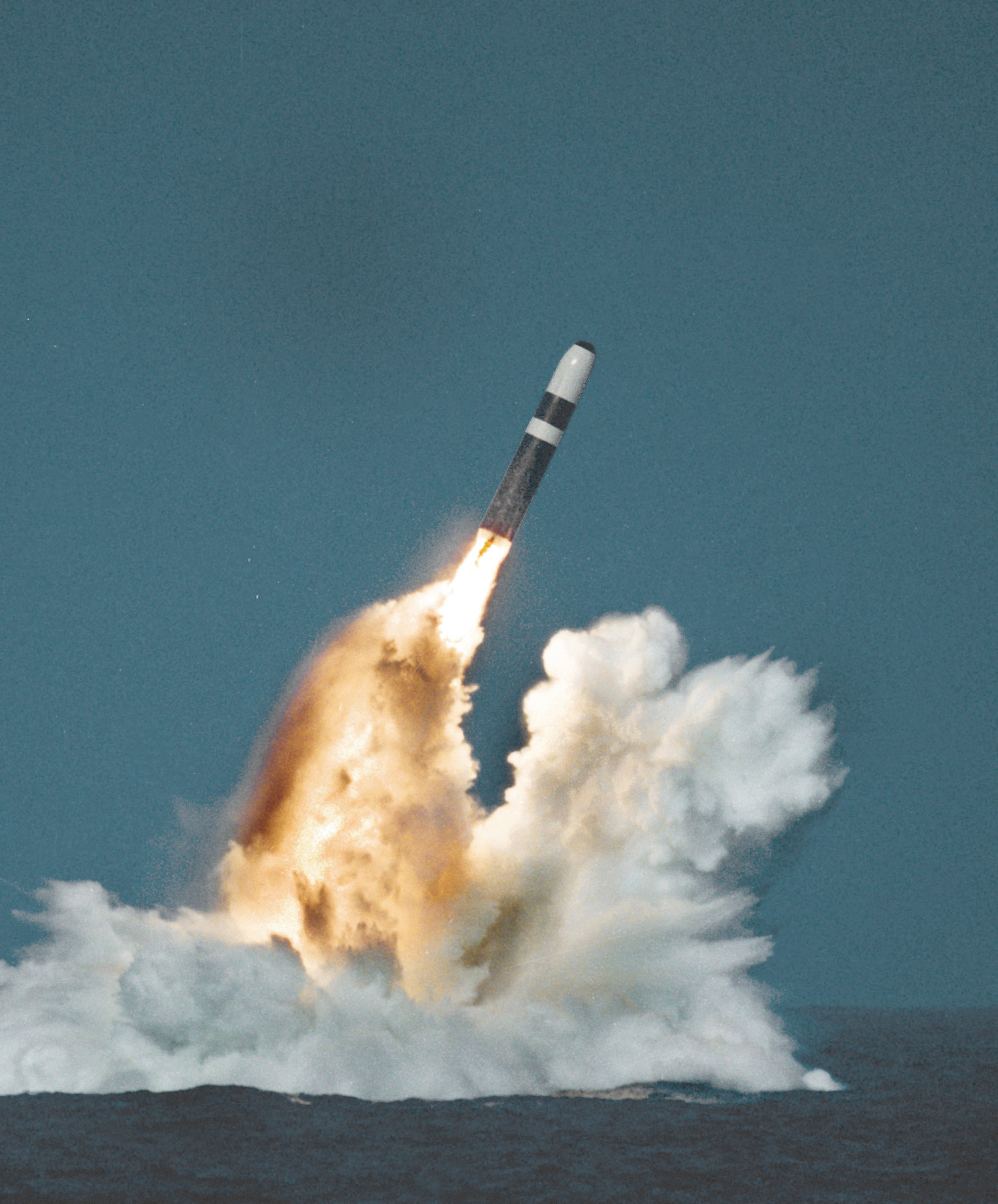
Trident missile launch at sea from a Royal Navy Vanguard-class ballistic missile submarine

- (United States) The U.S. Navy currently has 18 Ohio-class submarines deployed, of which 14 are designated SSBNs and armed with 24 Trident II SLBMs each, for a total of 288 Trident II missiles equipped with 1,152 MIRV nuclear warheads.
- (Russia) The Russian Navy currently has 13 SSBNs deployed, including 5 Delta IV-class submarines, and 8 Borei-class submarines. Missiles include R-29R SLBMs, R-29RMU Sineva / R-29RMU2 Liner SLBMs with MIRV warheads and Bulava SLBMs with MIRV warheads.
- The United Kingdom's Royal Navy has four Vanguard-class SSBNs, each armed with 16 Trident II SLBMs with MIRV warheads for a total of 64 Trident II missiles and 225 nuclear warheads.
- (France) The French Navy has four Triomphant-class SSBNs each armed with 16 M45s SLBMs with TN75 MIRV nuclear warheads. The M45 SLBMs are scheduled to be upgraded to M51.1 and M51.2 (expected to enter service in 2015).
- The People's Republic of China's People's Liberation Army Navy has five Type 094 SSBNs each to be armed with 12-16 JL-2 SLBMs.
- India: It was revealed in 2011 that India is developing a submarine launch ballistic missiles based on some variants of the Agni series, the K Missile family which will be a series of submarine-launched solid fueled missiles. K-5 missile, with a maximum range of 6,000 to 8000 kilometers and a payload of one tonne, is under development by DRDO which may be the SLBM version of AGNI-VI (ICBM). India, having completed the development of its first ballistic missile submarine INS Arihant, is reported to be developing at least four submarines in the Arihant class.

== See also ==
- Intermediate-range ballistic missile (IRBM)
- Submarine-launched ballistic missile
- Comparison of ICBMs
- List of missiles
- List of orbital launch systems
- List of sounding rockets
- List of unguided rockets
- List of upper stages
- Comparison of lift launch systems
- Model rocket
- List of rocket planes
- List of weapons
- List of artillery § Rockets
- Expendable launch system
- NATO reporting name (has lists of various Soviet missiles)
