= People's Liberation Army Navy Submarine Force =

Submarine service of the People's Liberation Army Navy

Flag of the People's Liberation Army Navy (PLAN)

The People's Liberation Army Navy Submarine Force (PLANSF) is the submarine service of the People's Liberation Army Navy. It consists of all types of submarines in operational service organized into three fleets: the North Sea Fleet, the East Sea Fleet, and the South Sea Fleet. Submarines have long been one of the three focuses of the People's Liberation Army Navy (the other two are aircraft and major surface combatants), and when the decision was made in late 2006 to concentrate on building other principal surface combatants to strengthen the air defense and to further delay the construction of aircraft carriers due to insufficient air cover, submarines will continue to play the lead dominant role in the assault force for the PLAN. Currently, PLANSF operates a fleet of 66 submarines which include nuclear as well as conventional submarines.

Its surface branch counterpart is the People's Liberation Army Navy Surface Force.

== Nuclear-powered ballistic missile submarines ==
Type 094 (Jin-class)

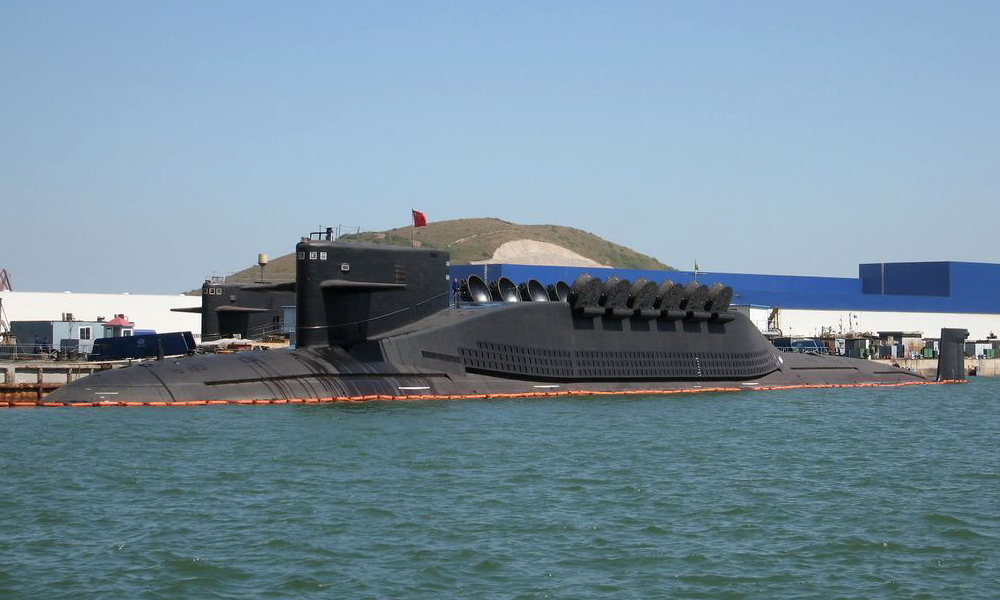
Type 094 (Jin-class)

The PLAN currently operates two classes of ballistic missile submarines with another under construction:

- Type 096 submarine (NATO designation Tang-class) - 6 planned, 2 under construction.
- Type 094 submarine (NATO designation Jin-class) - 6 In service 2 more planned.

=== Development ===
China's first ballistic missile submarine, Type 092 submarine, was laid down in 1978, launched in 1981 and commissioned by 1983. Its primary weapon is the JL-1 SLBM, with 12 launch tubes, as well as six 533 mm tubes for self-defense. The JL-1 missile was not ready until the first successful test launch of the missile from the Type 092 in 1988. Previous launch attempts from 1985 had failed. The missile's short range only permits the 092 to launch its missiles against regional targets. Striking targets far away require the submarine to travel dangerously closer to enemy waters. The Type 092 has since undergone a major modernisation refit, with a new black-coated paint and possibly other improvements with unofficial reports indicating the Type 092 is now carrying an improved missile, the JL-1A that is alleged to have longer range.

The Type 094 submarine is believed to have been influenced by Russian assistance. It features 12 launch tubes for the longer ranged JL-2 missile, which has an 8,000 km range that can carry 3 to 4 MIRVs. The 094 would be permitted to patrol nearer Chinese waters, with the ability to launch its missiles against continental US targets. Analysts believe that China obtained technological assistance from Russia to quiet its submarines in exchange for its assistance during the Russo-Ukrainian war.

== Nuclear-powered fleet submarines ==
Type 093 (Shang-class)

China was the first Asian country and the 5th globally to successfully design, build and commission a nuclear-powered submarine. The PLAN currently has two types of nuclear-powered attack submarines in service with another in development:

- Type 095 submarine (NATO designation Sui-class) - In development.
- Type 093 submarine (NATO designation Shang-class) - 6 in service, 2 under construction.
- Type 091 submarine (NATO designation Han-class) - 3 in service, 2 retired.

=== Development ===
Nuclear submarines have been envisaged in the PLAN since the 1950s. Despite ambition and a long history of development, the acquisition of nuclear submarines has been a difficult and time-consuming process. The Cultural Revolution greatly disrupted nuclear submarine development. The Sino-Soviet split prevented any Soviet assistance in nuclear propulsion, and these propulsion problems have been troublesome to this day.

The first Chinese nuclear-powered submarine was laid down in 1967 but not completed until 1974, the Type 091 submarine. The Type 091 experienced more than 20 years of development, with the last of the class not being commissioned until 1990. Since their commission the class has gone through major upgrades and numerous refits with the remaining boats having been greatly refitted with new sonars and anechoic tiles (which reduce noise levels). The Type 091 has mostly operated in local waters, but since the 1990s, they have been used more aggressively. A Type 091 shadowed a US carrier battle group in the mid-1990s, and more recently, operated around Japanese waters, prompting a Japanese task force to chase the submarine out of its territory. The Type 091 submarines are far from being as capable or effective as their American Los Angeles-class counterparts, but with recent improvements they can pose a great threat by operating deep in the Western Pacific and attacking targets that are less well-protected by ASW coverage. Two of this class have been retired - the Changzheng 01 (hull no.401) in 2000 and the Changzheng 02 (hull no.402) in 2005.

A new class of submarine has been in development since the 1980s, when the PLAN first sought a replacement for the Han-class. Little information has emerged about the Type 093 submarine, but it is believed to have some Russian influence. The 093 design may be comparable to the Russian Victor III-class, signifying a significant step forward for Chinese nuclear attack submarines. The 093 has been the focus of much attention from US and Asian military analysts. Its improved capabilities will undoubtedly increase PLAN power in the region and its ability to carry war to the West Pacific. Such submarines can escort future ballistic missile submarines as well as attacking US Navy carrier battle groups in the deep ocean. Six Type 093 submarines are in service with two more under construction.

China is constructing a major underground nuclear submarine base near Sanya, Hainan. The Daily Telegraph in 2008 reported that tunnels were being built into hillsides which could be capable of hiding up to 20 nuclear submarines from spy satellites.

- Type 041 submarine (NATO designation Zhou-class) - 1 being built.

The Zhou-class submarine is a new class of fleet or attack submarines. The first images of the Type 041 appeared in April 2022, in drydock at Huludao Port. The Zhou-class submarine was notably longer than the Type 093 or Type 094, although reporters from Reuters stated it was unclear whether the class represented a new model, or an upgrade of an existing class. While other analysts disputed claims of the submarine being nuclear powered, instead claiming translation errors and assumptions, and that the submarine is more likely conventionally powered. So far, it appears that only one submarine in the class has been built, which in September 2024, was revealed by aerial photographs to have allegedly sunk in May or June while under construction.

== Conventionally-powered attack submarines ==
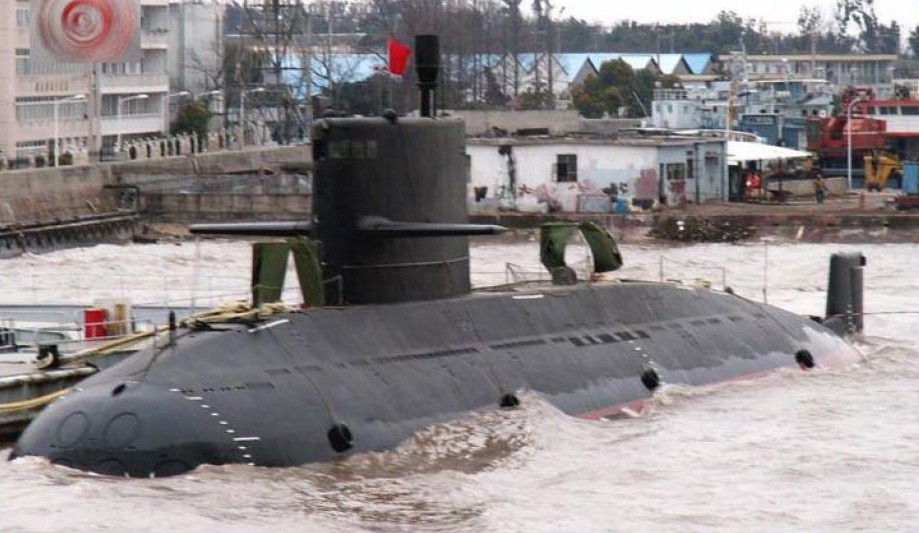
Type 039A (Yuan-class)

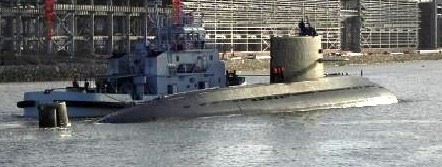
Type 039 (Yuan-class)

Submarine warfare is regarded as a vital part of PLAN's coastal defense doctrine. Large numbers of conventional powered submarines have therefore been constructed and commissioned, and this force makes up the bulk of the PLAN's submarines. The PLAN currently operates four different classes of conventional submarines:

- Type 039A submarine (NATO designation Yuan-class) - In service.
- Type 039 submarine (NATO designation Song-class) - In service.
- Kilo-class submarine (NATO designation Kilo-class) - In service.
- Type 035 submarine (NATO designation Ming-class) - In service.

=== Development ===
The first class of conventionally powered submarine to be operated by the PLAN was the Soviet Whiskey-class. The Whiskey was imported from the Soviet Union and subsequently built in considerable numbers and served until the last few remaining boats were removed during the mid-1990s. The second type to be operated also owed its origins to the Soviet Union, the Romeo-class, they were built under licence in China as the Type 033 submarine. Production of this submarine took place from the late 1960s until the late 1980s. The Type 033 went on to form the backbone of the PLAN submarine forces, and has been estimated that more than 100 may have been produced for the PLAN and for export. By the late 1990s, a large number of 033s had been retired from active duty and pulled into reserves. A handful of upgraded hulls remained in service until the late 2000s for training and other limited purposes.

The Type 035 submarine (Ming-class), first commissioned in 1974, is based on the Type 033. It could be considered as China's first indigenously designed submarine, despite its similarities to the Romeo-class. A total of 21 were built, but many of the initial hulls didn't perform well and were subsequently scrapped. At least 17 hulls are still in service, with later hulls using modern sonar systems, including the French DUUX-5. The later hulls of the Ming-class may have been employed for testing Air-independent propulsion (AIP), which would significantly reduce the noise level of the submarine. Mings have reportedly been exercising more frequently since the mid-2000s and making recent incursions into Japanese waters. On one occasion a Ming surfaced briefly within Japanese waters before submerging again.

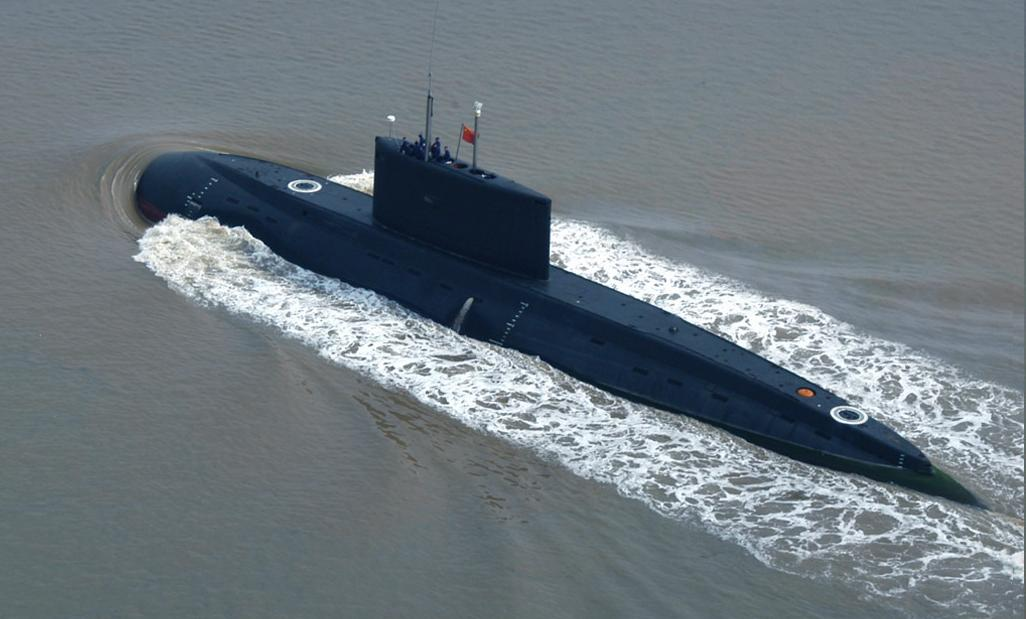
Russian-built Kilo-class in Chinese service

The PLAN in the 1990s sought to acquire a modern conventional submarine with emphasis on sensors, weaponry, and modern capabilities to engage enemy submarines in modern warfare. In 1994 it ordered two Kilo-class 877EKM type submarines from Russia, which were delivered by 1995. In 1996, two improved Kilo-class 636 submarines were ordered, delivered between 1997 and 1998. In 2002, a $2 billion deal was signed for eight more Kilo-class 636, these submarines particularly fitted with the capability of launching the Russian Novator 3M-54E Klub S cruise missile capable of engaging land and sea targets at 220 km. The Kilo class represents a huge leap forward in the PLAN submarine fleet. Originally a Soviet design in the 1980s, the Kilo-class was meant to be one of the world's quietest class of submarines. With 12 Kilos operational by 2006, it is unclear whether PLAN will buy more of these potent vessels.

Despite the purchase of the Kilo-class, the PLAN has continued to develop indigenous designs. The Type 039 submarine (Song-class) was first launched in 1994 with sea trials in 1995. It featured Western influences with a German propulsion system, seven blade skewed propeller and noise-reduction rubber tiles; however, the first hull retained the traditional stepped sail. The first hull was not fully operational until 1999. As a result of the sea trials a significantly modified designs emerged, with a number of improvements, including a conventional sail. By 2006 about 13 hulls have been confirmed to be built so far, indicating the class has performed satisfactorily. The Song-class presents a major milestone to indigenous submarine designs, being comparable in capabilities to contemporary Western submarines. Song submarines are armed with torpedoes and a sub-launched variant of the YJ-8 anti-ship missile. An AIP system may be installed in the future.

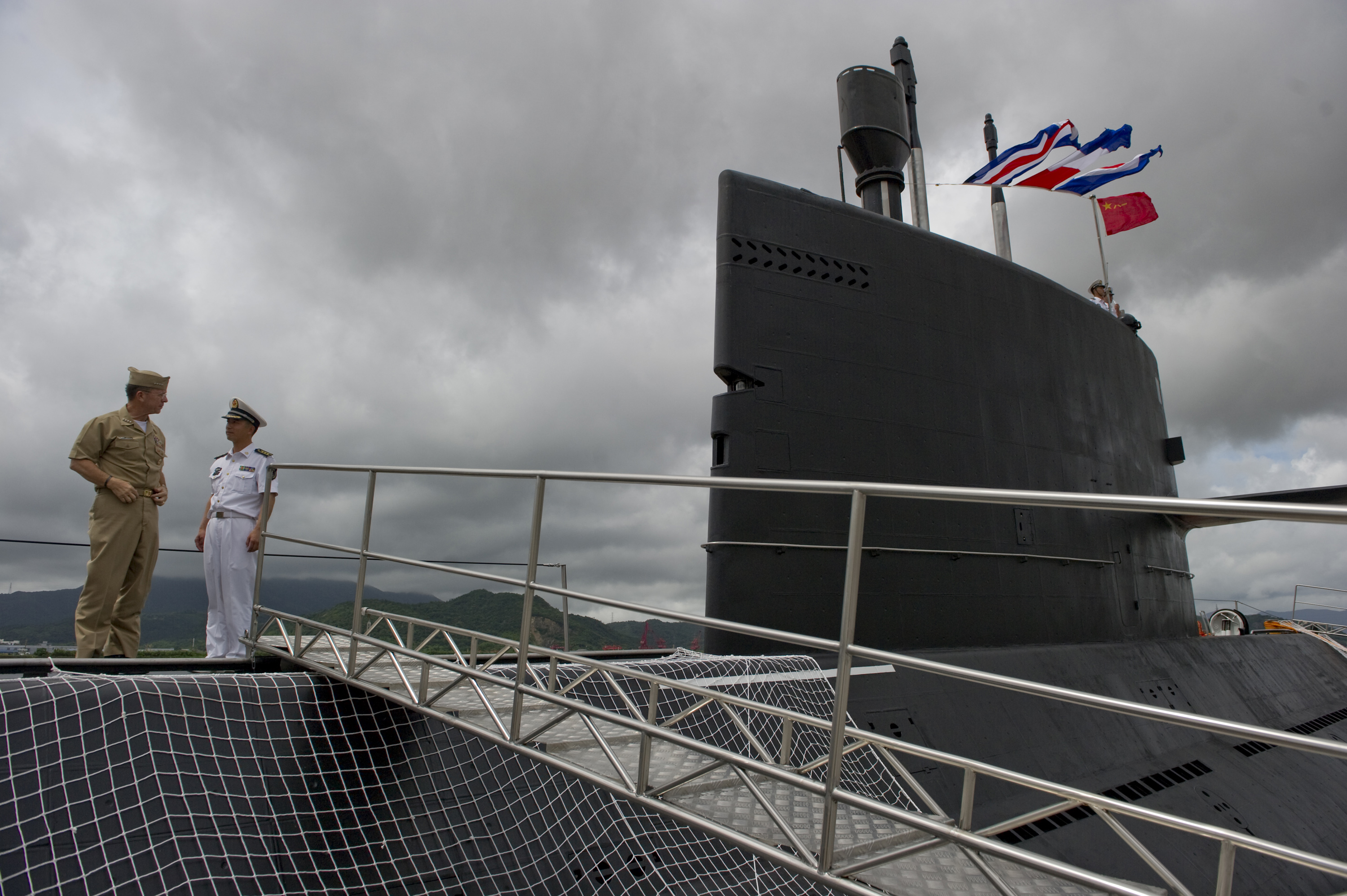
A Yuan-class submarine visited by USN at the Zhoushan Naval Base in 2011

The Type 039A submarine (Yuan-class) is the latest of China's indigenous submarine. The hull seems to resemble Russian influences (as it is similar to the Kilo) while also adapting features found on the Type 039. The Yuan-class is likely fitted with an AIP system to achieve maximum silent operational capabilities and can be armed with advanced Russian and Chinese torpedoes and cruise missiles. The Yuan-class came as a surprise to US military intelligence, as the submarine's existence was entirely unknown until internet images emerged. This class of submarine is expected to have capabilities which surpass the Kilo and Song-classes considerably. Series production began late in 2007, with at least 17 boats identified so far and up to 3 more under construction.

In early-2014, the Kilo-class 372 suddenly lost buoyancy and descended after encountering a halocline. The sudden increase in pressure damaged the boat and caused flooding in the engine compartment. The crew halted the descent in three minutes and the boat returned to the surface. The crew received awards on September 2; Wang Hongli, the submarine's commander, was awarded the Meritorious Service Medal, first-class.

== Conventionally-powered ballistic missile submarine ==
- Type 032 submarine (NATO designation Qing-class) - In service as technology testbed.

== Nomenclature ==
The Naval Vessels Naming Regulation prescribes the following prefixes for submarines under PLANSF.

Ship	Named after
Nuclear submarines	Changzheng (Chinese: 长征; pinyin: Chángzhēng; lit. 'Long March') followed by a serial number
Ballistic and cruise missile armed conventional submarines	Yuanzheng (Chinese: 远征; pinyin: Yuǎnzhēng; lit. 'Expedition') followed by a serial number
Conventional submarines	Changcheng (Chinese: 长城; pinyin: Chángchēng; lit. 'Great Wall') followed by a serial number

== Submarine bases ==
China has a number of dedicated submarine bases, some of which have underground facilities accessed via tunnels. The following bases have been confirmed through Google Earth imagery:

- Yulin Naval Base, Hainan Island- nuclear powered boats
- Jianggezhuang Naval Base- nuclear powered boats
- Qingdao Naval Base - conventionally powered boats
- Lyshunkao Naval Base - conventionally powered boats
- Daxie Island Naval Base - conventionally powered boats
- Xiachuan Island Naval Base - conventionally powered boats
- Anyou Naval Base, Hainan Island - conventionally powered boats
- Sanya Naval Base, Hainan Island - conventionally powered boats

== See also ==
- List of active People's Liberation Army Navy ships
- People's Liberation Army Navy Surface Force
- People's Liberation Army Navy Air Force
- Ballistic missile submarine: Submarine-launched ballistic missile
