= List of nuclear-capable aircraft =

This is a list of military aircraft which are believed to be certified or assigned to carry nuclear weapons, including individual variants.

== List of current nuclear-capable aircraft ==
Italics indicate a nuclear sharing mission, where one country operates aircraft to deliver another country's nuclear weapons.

List of current nuclear-capable aircraft
Aircraft	Nuclear operators	Gravity bombs	Missiles	Notes	Ref.
Xi'an H-6N	China	none	1 × JL-1		
Dassault Rafale BF3/4	France	none	1 × ASMP-A		
Dassault Rafale MF3/4	France	none	1 × ASMP-A		
Tupolev Tu-95MSM	Russia	none	6–16 × Kh-55; 14 × Kh-36		
Tupolev Tu-160	Russia	none	12 × Kh-55SM; 12 × Kh-38		
Tupolev Tu-22M3	Russia	possible	possible		
Sukhoi Su-24M	Russia	possible	possible		
Sukhoi Su-34	Russia	possible	possible		
Mikoyan MiG-31K	Russia	possible	possible		
Dassault Mirage 2000	India	1 × 12 kt bomb	none		
SEPECAT Jaguar	India	1 × 12 kt bomb	none		
McDonnell Douglas F-15I Ra'am	Israel	possible			
General Dynamics F-16I Sufa	Israel	possible			
Lockheed Martin F-35I Adir	Israel	possible			
Dassault Mirage III	Pakistan	1 × 5–12 kt bomb	1 × Ra'ad I 1 × Ra'ad-II		
Dassault Mirage 5	Pakistan	1 × 5–12 kt bomb	1 × Ra'ad I 1 × Ra'ad-II		
Boeing B-52H Stratofortress	United States	none	8–20 × AGM-86B		
Northrop B-2A Spirit	United States	16 × B61 nuclear bomb	none		
McDonnell Douglas F-15E Strike Eagle	United States	5 × B61 nuclear bomb	none		
General Dynamics F-16MLU Fighting Falcon	Belgium	2 × B61 nuclear bomb	none		
General Dynamics F-16C/D Fighting Falcon	United States	2 × B61 nuclear bomb	none		
Lockheed Martin F-35A Lightning II	United States; Netherlands	2 × B61 nuclear bomb	none		
Panavia Tornado IDS	Germany; Italy	2 × B61 nuclear bomb	none		

== See also ==
- List of current nuclear triads
- List of intercontinental ballistic missiles
- Comparison of ICBMs
- List of submarine-launched ballistic missiles
