= CSS4 (disambiguation) =

CSS 4 can be:

- The most recent generation of the Cascading Style Sheets specification
- A Chinese intercontinental ballistic missile, more commonly known as DF-5, but also as CSS-4.
