= Chinese submarine 201 =

Submarine in China

Class overview
- Operators: People's Liberation Army Navy
- Preceded by: Type 031 submarine

History

China
- Builder: Wuhan Shipyard
- Laid down: 2008
- Launched: 9 September 2010
- Commissioned: 16 October 2012
- Status: Active

General characteristics
- Class & type: Type 032
- Type: Auxiliary submarine
- Displacement: 3,797 tons (surfaced); ca. 6,600 tons (submerged)
- Length: 92.6 metres (304 ft)
- Beam: 10.6 metres (35 ft)
- Draught: 7.0 metres (23.0 ft)
- Installed power: Diesel-electric
- Armament: Ballistic missile launch tube

The Chinese submarine with the hull number 201 is a Chinese diesel–electric auxiliary submarine. It is used to test systems and technologies, including test launching ballistic missiles (SLBM). 201 is the sole member of its class, designated Type 032 (NATO reporting name: Qing).

== History ==
201 commissioned into the People's Liberation Army Navy (PLAN) in 2012; the previous SLBM testbed, a Golf-class submarine (Type 031), subsequently decommissioned in 2013. It participated in testing the JL-2 SLBM. 201 made the first three JL-3 test launches starting in 2018.

== Description ==
201 resembles an enlarged Type 039A submarine, with bow-mounted retractable diving planes, instead of sail-mounted. The sail is disproportionately long, and extends below the keel like the Golf-class; at least one ballistic missile launch tube is fitted at the rear of the sail. In 2017, the height of the rear sail was increased, likely to support the larger JL-3.

== Notes ==
=== Bibliography ===
- Saunders, Stephan, ed. (2015). Jane's Fighting Ships 2015-2016. Jane's Information Group. ISBN 978-0710631435.
- Wertheim, Eric (2013). The Naval Institute Guide to Combat Fleets of the World: Their Ships, Aircraft, and Systems (16 ed.). Annapolis, Maryland: Naval Institute Press. ISBN 978-1591149545.
- Kirchberger, Sarah (2015). Assessing China's Naval Power: Technological Innovation, Economic Constraints, and Strategic Implications. Global Power Shift. Heidelberg: Springer. ISBN 978-3-662-47126-5.
