= Zhang Jinlin =

Chinese engineer (1936–2023)

- 张金麟
- Born: 16 October 1936; Luan County, Hebei, China
- Died: 9 January 2023 (aged 86); Wuhan, Hubei, China
- Education: Harbin Institute of Technology
- Scientific career
- Fields: Nuclear submarine's power and entirety
- Workplaces: 719 Research Institute of China Shipbuilding Industry Corporation

Chinese name
- Simplified Chinese: 张金麟
- Traditional Chinese: 張金麟
Transcriptions
Standard Mandarin
- Hanyu Pinyin: Zhāng Jīnlín

Zhang Jinlin (Chinese: 张金麟; 16 October 1936 – 9 January 2023) was a Chinese engineer, and an academician of the Chinese Academy of Engineering.

== Biography ==
Zhang was born in Luan County (now Luanzhou), Hebei, on 16 October 1936. In 1955, he was admitted to Harbin Institute of Technology, where he majored in turbine.

After graduated from university in 1960, Zhang became an engineer at the No. 9 Research Office of the Naval Scientific Research Department. He joined the Chinese Communist Party (CCP) in March 1974. In 1971, he was transferred to the 719 Research Institute of China Shipbuilding Industry Corporation, where was promoted to deputy director in 1983 and to director in 1992. In 1996, he was appointed as the chief designer of China's nuclear submarine project.

Zhang is the third chief designer of China's nuclear submarine project (the first chief designer is Peng Shilu, and the second one is Huang Xuhua), and he made great contributions to develop and build the Type 094 ballistic missile submarine. Zhang once said that he was deeply influenced by Peng Shilu.

On 9 January 2023, Zhang died in Wuhan, Hubei, at the age of 86.

== Honours and awards ==
- 1989 State Science and Technology Progress Award (Second Class)
- 1996 State Science and Technology Progress Award (Special)
- December 2007 Member of the Chinese Academy of Engineering (CAE)
- 2016 State Science and Technology Progress Award (First Class)
