= Type 096 submarine =

Chinese nuclear-powered ballistic missile submarine class

Class overview
- Name: Type 096
- Operators: People's Liberation Army Navy
- Preceded by: Type 094 submarine

General characteristics
- Type: SSBN
- Displacement: 20,000 tons (submerged)
- Propulsion: Nuclear reactor
- Armament: JL-3 SLBMs (?)

The Type 096 (NATO reporting name: Tang class) is a projected class of nuclear-powered ballistic missile submarine (SSBN) for China's People's Liberation Army Navy Submarine Force. The submarine was expected to begin construction in the early 2020s and be armed with the JL-3 SLBM.

Recent analysis deduced that China is on track to complete the first Type 096 and make it operational before the end of the decade. Type 096 submarine is believed to improve China's undersea second strike capability.

The submarine is believed to have similar acoustic quieting technology used in Russia's Akula-class submarine.

== Specifications and details ==
The Type 096 will be the most modern Chinese submarines in terms of stealth, sensors and weapons. The capabilities of the Type 096 are speculated to be a significant jump to its predecessors, which would flip the balance in the Indo-Pacific. In November 2023, satellite imagery on the Huludao shipyard showed pressure hull sections for a large submarine being worked up, which was then stated to likely be the Type 096 in early construction. The vessel is also speculated to be significantly larger than the old Type 094, estimated to displace 20,000 tons when fully submerged, and follows a design similar to that of Russia's; allowing it to contain an internal raft mounted on complex rubber supports that helps dampen the noise of the submarine's engines.

== See also ==
- People's Liberation Army Navy Submarine Force
- Nuclear weapons of China
