= Multiple independently targetable reentry vehicle =

Ballistic missile payload containing multiple warheads which are independently targetable

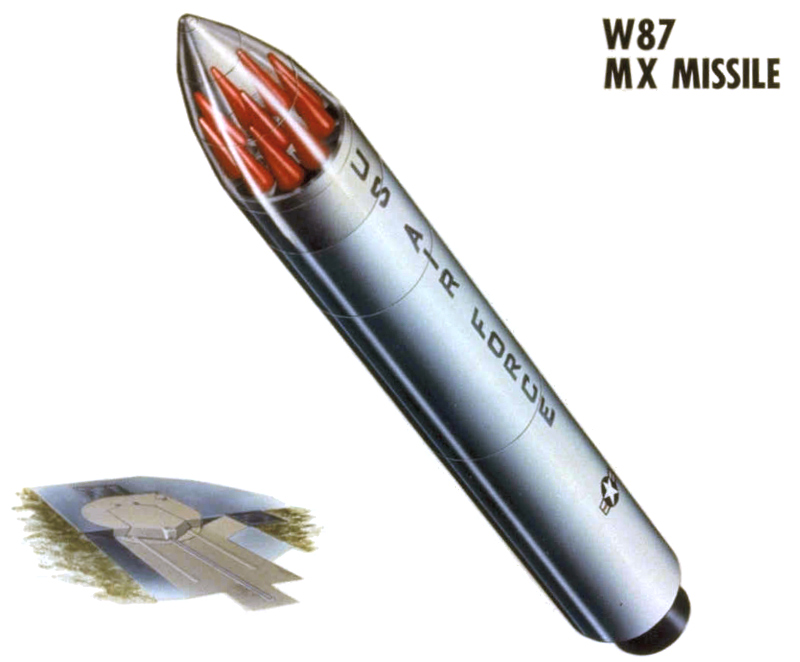
The MIRV U.S. Peacekeeper missile, with the re-entry vehicles highlighted in red.

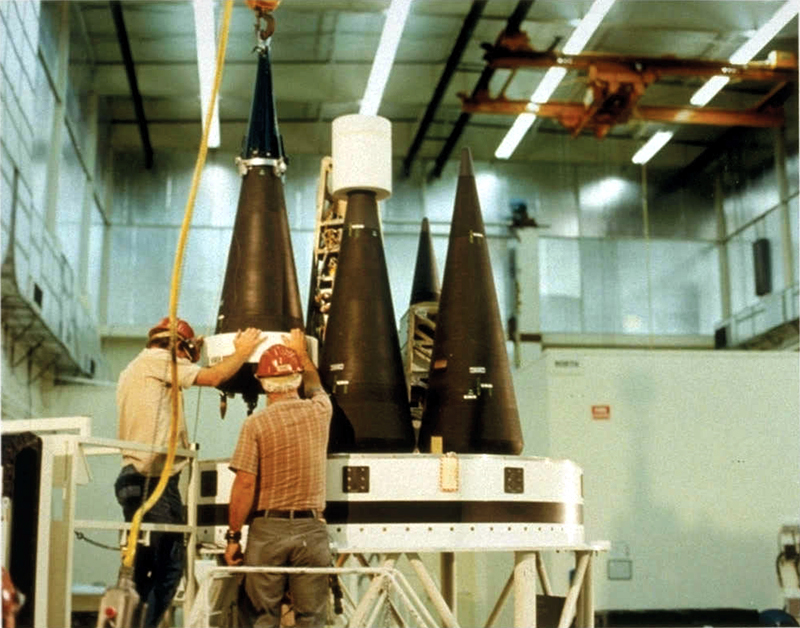
Technicians secure a number of Mk12A re-entry vehicles on a Peacekeeper MIRV bus.

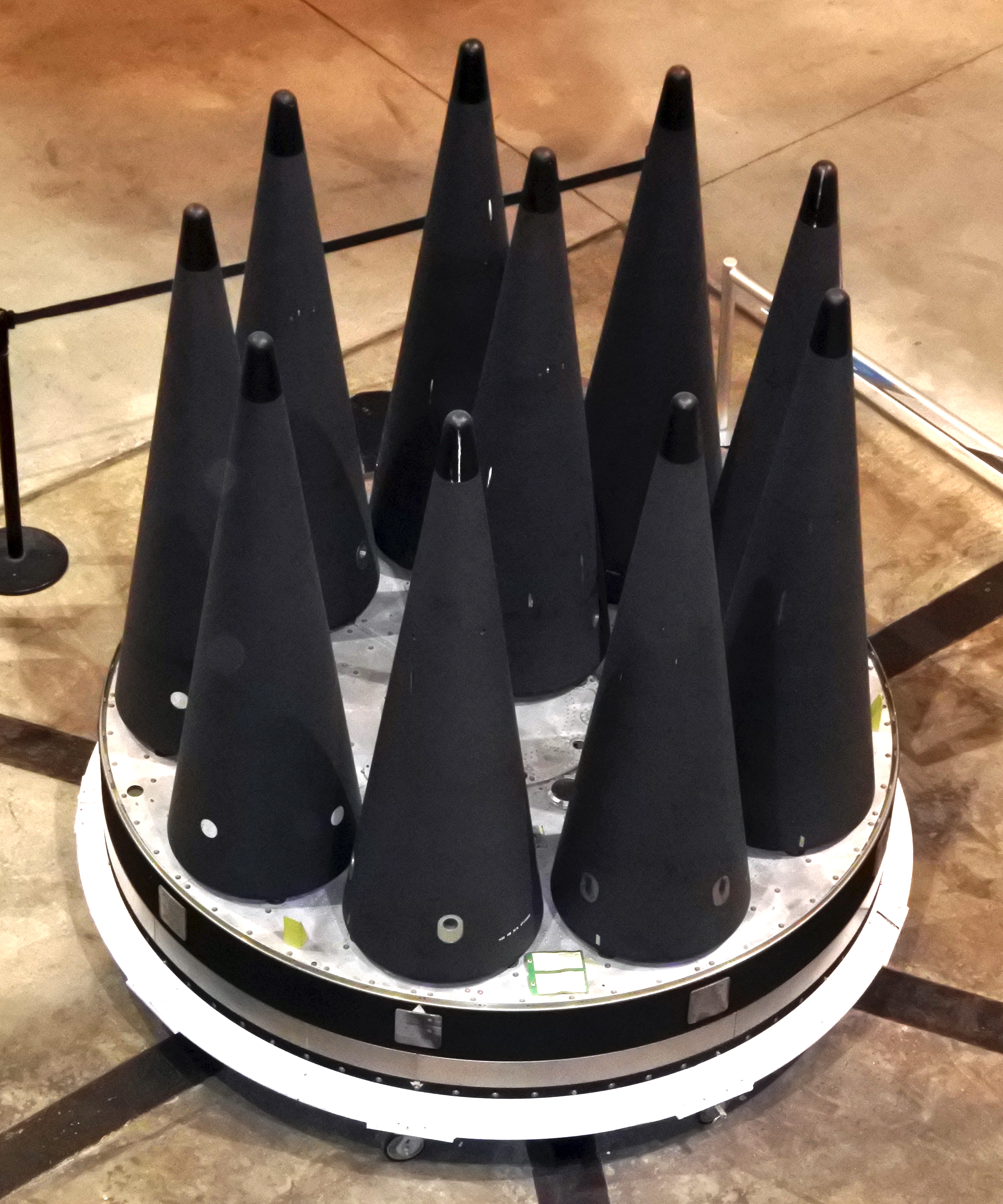
LGM-118A Peacekeeper MIRV at the National Museum of the United States Air Force.

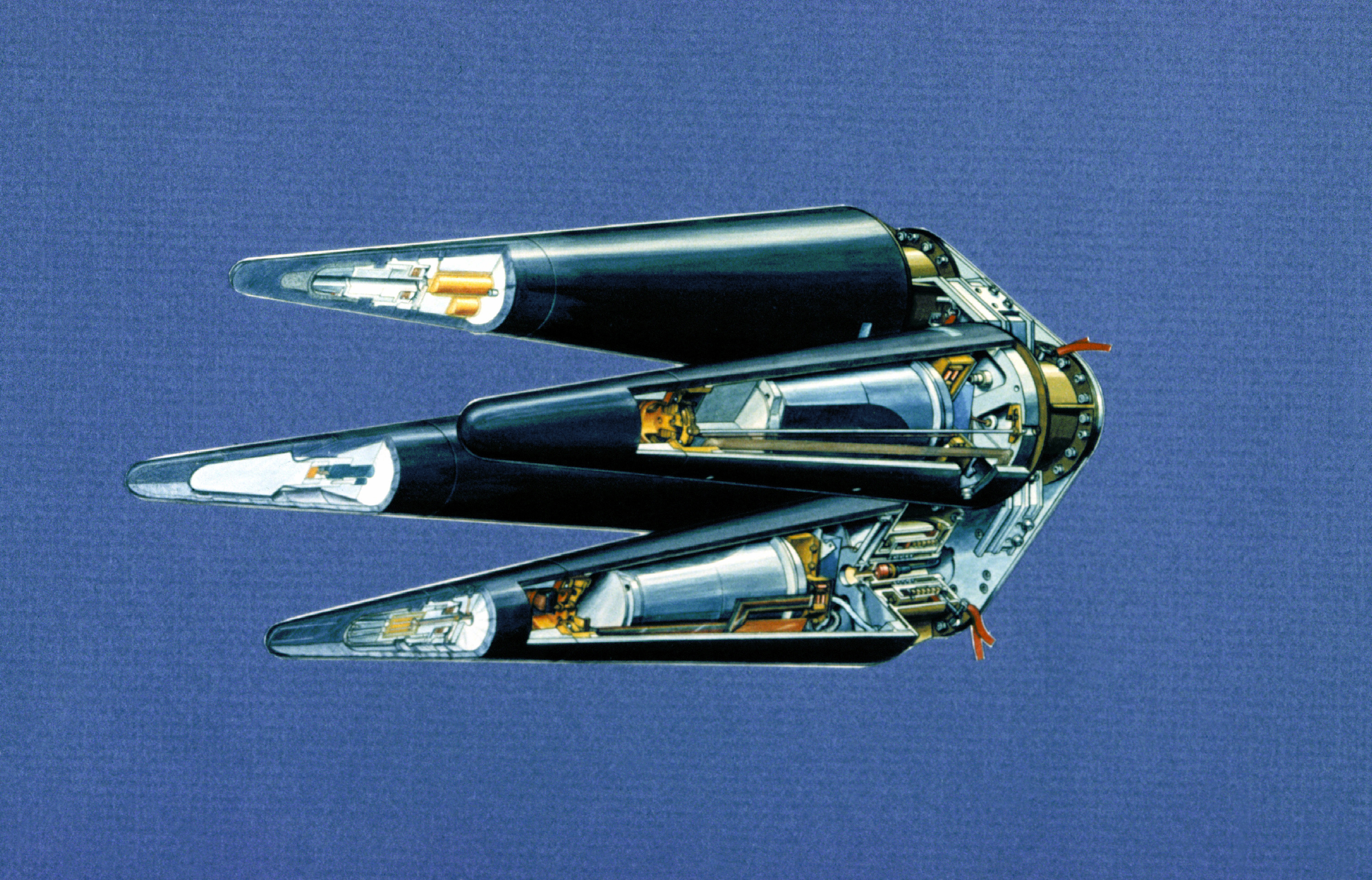
Cut away diagram of a MIRV.

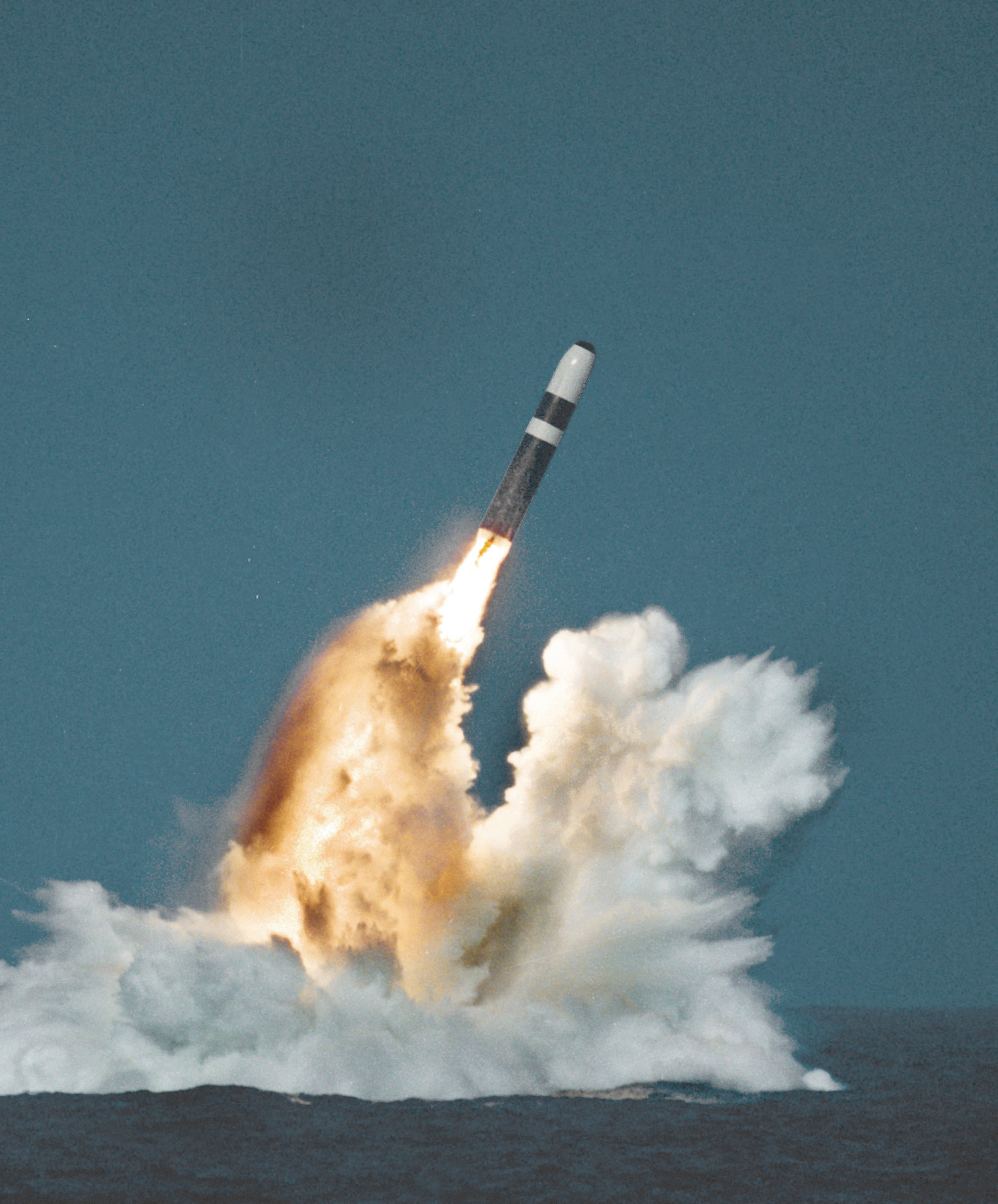
A Trident II missile, operated exclusively by the US Navy and Royal Navy. Each missile can carry up to 12 warheads.

A multiple independently targetable reentry vehicle (MIRV) is an exoatmospheric ballistic missile payload containing several warheads, each capable of being aimed to hit a different target. The concept is almost invariably associated with intercontinental ballistic missiles carrying thermonuclear warheads, even if not strictly being limited to them. An intermediate case is the multiple reentry vehicle (MRV) missile which carries several warheads which are dispersed but not individually aimed. All nuclear-weapon states except Pakistan (Note: "Pakistan is confirmed to possess MIRV technology, but there is no confirmation yet that it has deployed MIRV missiles.") and North Korea (Note: "North Korea claims to possess and have successfully tested a MIRV, but there is no confirmation yet that it has operationally deployed MIRVs on any missiles.") are currently confirmed to have deployed MIRV missile systems.

The first true MIRV design was the Minuteman III, first successfully tested in 1968 and introduced into actual use in 1970. The Minuteman III held three smaller W62 warheads, with yields of about 170 kilotons of TNT (710 TJ) each in place of the single 1.2 megatons of TNT (5.0 PJ) W56 used on the Minuteman II. From 1970 to 1975, the United States would remove approximately 550 earlier versions of the Minuteman ICBM in the Strategic Air Command's (SAC) arsenal and replace them with the new Minuteman IIIs outfitted with a MIRV payload, increasing their overall effectiveness. The smaller power of the warheads used (W62, W78 and W87) was offset by increasing the accuracy of the system, allowing it to attack the same hard targets as the larger, less accurate, W56. The MMIII was introduced specifically to address the Soviet construction of an anti-ballistic missile (ABM) system around Moscow; MIRV allowed the US to overwhelm any conceivable ABM system without increasing the size of their own missile fleet. The Soviets responded by adding MIRV to their R-36 design, first with three warheads in 1975, and eventually up to ten in later versions. While the United States phased out the use of MIRVs in ICBMs in 2014 to comply with New START, Russia continues to develop new ICBM designs using the technology.

The introduction of MIRV led to a major change in the strategic balance. Previously, with one warhead per missile, it was conceivable that one could build a defense that used missiles to attack individual warheads. Any increase in missile fleet by the enemy could be countered by a similar increase in interceptors. With MIRV, a single new enemy missile meant that multiple interceptors would have to be built, meaning that it was much less expensive to increase the attack than the defense. This cost-exchange ratio was so heavily biased towards the attacker that the concept of mutually assured destruction became the leading concept in strategic planning and ABM systems were severely limited in the 1972 Anti-Ballistic Missile Treaty in order to avoid a massive arms race.

In June 2017 the United States finished converting its Minuteman III missiles back to using a single reentry vehicle system, as part of its obligations under the New START treaty.

On November 21, 2024, Russia used a conventionally-armed MIRV system on the Oreshnik intermediate-range ballistic missile to attack the Ukrainian city of Dnipro, marking their first usage in combat.

== Purpose ==
The military purpose of a MIRV is fourfold:

- Enhance first-strike proficiency for strategic forces.
- Providing greater target damage for a given thermonuclear weapon payload. Several small and lower yield warheads cause much more target damage area than a single warhead alone. This, in turn, reduces the number of missiles and launch facilities required for a given destruction level – much the same as the purpose of a cluster munition.
- With single-warhead missiles, one missile must be launched for each target. By contrast, with a MIRV warhead, the post-boost (or bus) stage can dispense the warheads against multiple targets across a broad area.
- Reduces the effectiveness of an anti-ballistic missile system that relies on intercepting individual warheads. While an attacking MIRV missile can have multiple warheads (3-12 on United States and Russian missiles), interceptors may have only one warhead per missile. Thus, in both a military and an economic sense, MIRVs render ABM systems less effective, as the costs of maintaining a workable defense against MIRVs would greatly increase, requiring multiple defensive missiles for each offensive one. Decoy re-entry vehicles can be used alongside actual warheads to minimize the chances of the actual warheads being intercepted before they reach their targets. A system that destroys the missile earlier in its trajectory (before MIRV separation) is not affected by this but is more difficult, and thus more expensive to implement.

MIRV land-based ICBMs were considered destabilizing because they tended to put a premium on striking first. The world's first MIRV—US Minuteman III missile of 1970—threatened to rapidly increase the US's deployable nuclear arsenal and thus the possibility that it would have enough bombs to destroy virtually all of the Soviet Union's nuclear weapons and negate any significant retaliation. Later on the US feared the Soviet's MIRVs because Soviet missiles had a greater throw-weight and could thus put more warheads on each missile than the US could. For example, the US MIRVs might have increased their warhead per missile count by a factor of 6 while the Soviets increased theirs by a factor of 10. Furthermore, the US had a much smaller proportion of its nuclear arsenal in ICBMs than the Soviets. Bombers could not be outfitted with MIRVs so their capacity would not be multiplied. Thus the US did not seem to have as much potential for MIRV usage as the Soviets. However, the US had a larger number of submarine-launched ballistic missiles, which could be outfitted with MIRVs, and helped offset the ICBM disadvantage. It is because of their first-strike capability that land-based MIRVs were banned under the START II agreement. START II was ratified by the Russian Duma on 14 April 2000, but Russia withdrew from the treaty in 2002 after the US withdrew from the ABM treaty.

== Operation ==
In a MIRV, the main rocket motor (or booster) pushes a "bus" into a free-flight suborbital ballistic flight path. After the boost phase, the bus maneuvers using small on-board rocket motors and a computerized inertial guidance system. It takes up a ballistic trajectory that will deliver a re-entry vehicle containing a warhead to a target and then releases a warhead on that trajectory. It then maneuvers to a different trajectory, releasing another warhead, and repeats the process for all warheads.

Minuteman III MIRV launch sequence: 1. The missile launches out of its silo by firing its first-stage boost motor (A). 2. About 60 seconds after launch, the first-stage drops off and the second-stage motor (B) ignites. The missile shroud (E) is ejected. 3. About 120 seconds after launch, the third-stage motor (C) ignites and separates from the second-stage. 4. About 180 seconds after launch, the third-stage thrust terminates and the post-boost vehicle (D) separates from the rocket. 5. The post-boost vehicle maneuvers itself and prepares for re-entry vehicle (RV) deployment. 6. While the post-boost vehicle backs away, the RVs, decoys, and chaff are deployed (this may occur during ascent). 7. The RVs and chaff reenter the atmosphere at high speeds and are armed in flight. 8. The nuclear warheads detonate, either as air bursts or ground bursts.

The precise technical details are closely guarded military secrets, to hinder any development of enemy counter-measures. The bus's on-board propellant limits the distances between targets of individual warheads to generally a few hundred kilometers, with some capable of covering a footprint up to 1,500km between targets. Additionally, some buses (e.g. the British Chevaline system) can release decoys to confuse interception devices and radars, such as aluminized balloons or electronic noisemakers.

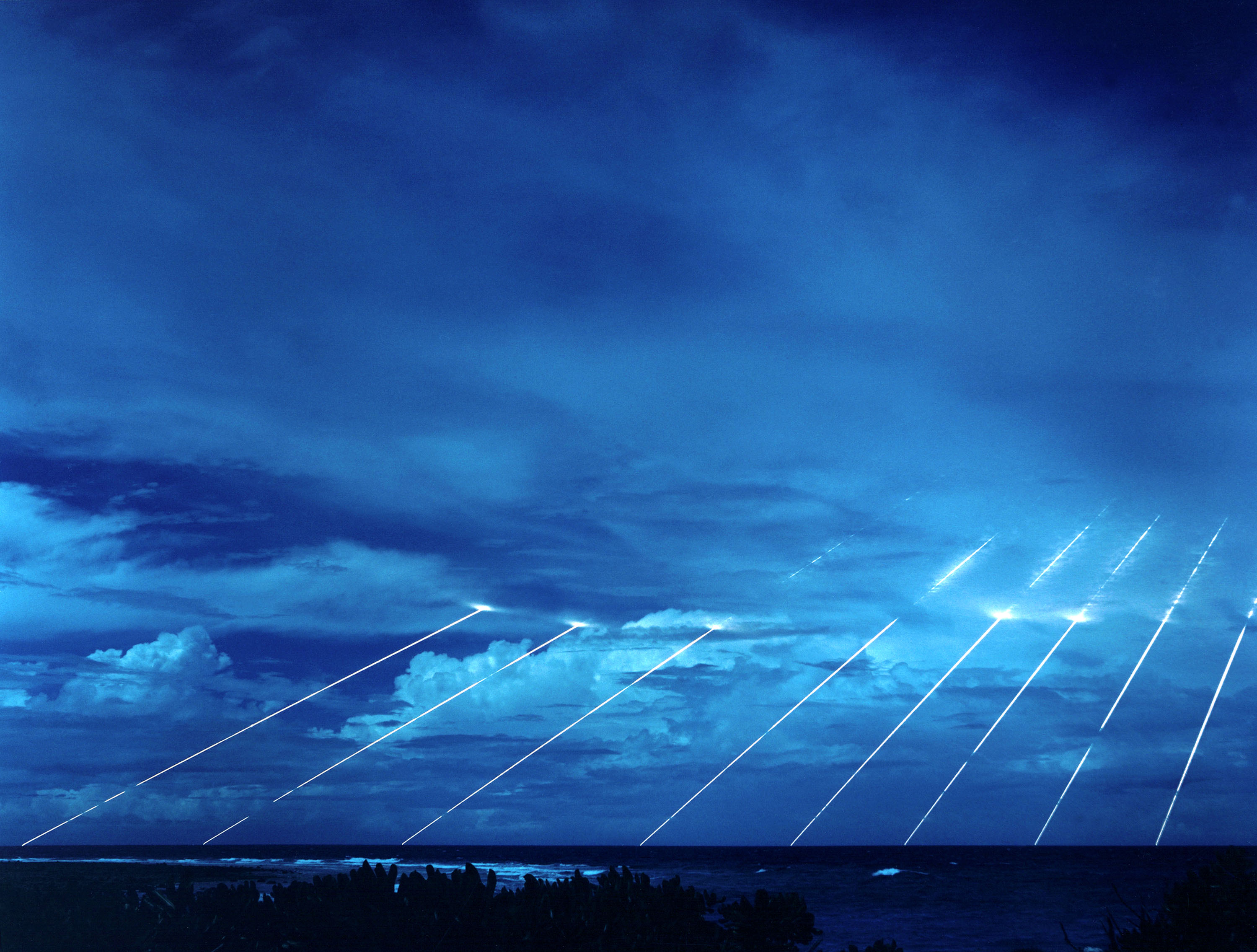
Testing of the Peacekeeper reentry vehicles: all eight (of a possible ten) were fired from only one missile. Each line shows the path of an individual warhead captured on reentry via long-exposure photography.

Accuracy is crucial because doubling the accuracy decreases the needed warhead energy by a factor of four for radiation damage and by a factor of eight for blast damage. Navigation system accuracy and the available geophysical information limits the warhead target accuracy. Accuracy is expressed as circular error probable (CEP). This is the radius of the circle that the warhead has a 50 percent chance of falling into when aimed at the center. CEP is about 90–100 m for the Trident II and Peacekeeper missiles.

== MRV ==
A multiple re-entry vehicle (MRV) system for a ballistic missile deploys multiple warheads above a single aimpoint which then drift apart, producing a cluster bomb-like effect. These warheads are not individually targetable. The advantage of an MRV over a single warhead is the increased effectiveness due to the greater coverage; this increases the overall damage produced within the center of the pattern, making it far greater than the damage possible from any single warhead in the MRV cluster; this makes for an efficient area-attack weapon and makes interception by anti-ballistic missiles more challenging due to the number of warheads being deployed at once.

Improved warhead designs allow smaller warheads for a given yield, while better electronics and guidance systems allow greater accuracy. As a result, MIRV technology has proven more attractive than MRV for advanced nations. Multiple-warhead missiles require both a miniaturized physics package and a lower mass re-entry vehicle, both of which are highly advanced technologies. As a result, single-warhead missiles are more attractive for nations with less advanced or less productive nuclear technology. The United States first deployed MRV warheads on the Polaris A-3 SLBM in 1964 on the USS Daniel Webster. The Polaris A-3 missile carried three warheads each having an approximate yield of 200 kilotonnes of TNT (840 TJ). This system was also used by the Royal Navy who also retained MRV with the Chevaline upgrade, though the number of warheads in Chevaline was reduced to two due to the ABM counter-measures carried. The Soviet Union deployed 3 MRVs on the R-27U SLBM and 3 MRVs on the R-36P ICBM. Refer to atmospheric re-entry for more details.

== Combat usage ==
On November 21, 2024, as part of the Russian invasion of Ukraine, Russia launched an Oreshnik intermediate-range ballistic missile, striking Dnipro. Western officials stated the missile used a MIRV system, marking their first use in combat. The night attack was reported to see six sequential vertical flashes, each comprising a cluster of up to six individual projectiles. Ukraine's air force initially claimed an intercontinental ballistic missile (range greater than 5,500 km) was used, and Ukrainian media initially reported it was an RS-26 Rubezh IRBM with range 5,800 km. The US and Russia confirmed it was intermediate-range (3,000–5,500 km), but the Pentagon stated it was based on the RS-26 IRBM. It was fired from the Astrakhan region 700 km away. UN spokesperson Stéphane Dujarric called the use of the intermediate-range weapon "concerning and worrying".

== MIRV-capable missiles ==
China

- DF-3A (retired, 3 warheads)
- DF-4A (retired, 3 warheads)
- DF-5B (active, 3-8 warheads)
- DF-5C (active, 10 warheads)
- DF-31A (active, 3-5 warheads)
- DF-31B (active, 3-5 warheads)
- DF-41 (active, up to 10 warheads)
- JL-2 (active, 1-3 warheads)
- JL-3 (under development)

France

- M4 (retired, 6 warheads)
- M45 (retired, 6 warheads)
- M51 (active, 6-10 warheads)

India

- Agni-V (active, 3-6 (tested) 10–12 (Operational) nuclear warheads)
- Agni Prime (active, 2 warheads)
- Agni-VI(under development)
- K-6 (under development)

Israel

- Jericho 3 (active, suspected capability, not announced, 2-3 technically possible)

North Korea

- Pukguksong-4 (unconfirmed)
- Hwasong-17
- Hwasong-19
- Hwasong-20 (under development)

Pakistan

- Ababeel (in development, 3-8 warheads)

USSR/Russian Federation

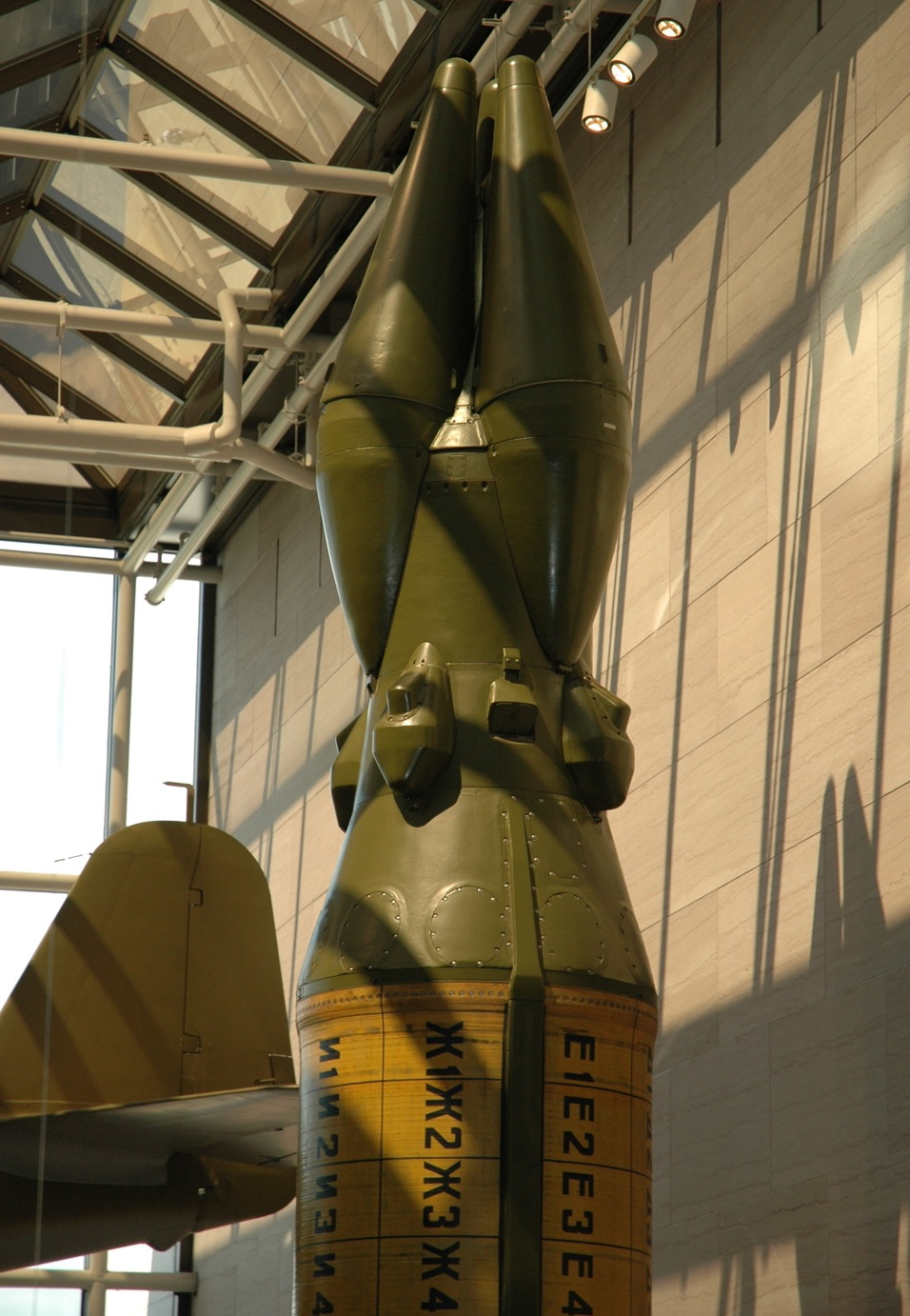
RSD-10 Pioneer MIRV at the National Air and Space Museum

- R-36 mod 4 (retired, 10-14 warheads)
- R-36 mod 5 (active, 10 warheads)
- R-29R (active, 3 warheads)
- R-29RK (retired, 7 warheads)
- MR-UR-100 Sotka (retired, 4 warheads)
- UR-100N mod 3 (retired, 6 warheads)
- RSD-10 Pioneer (retired, 3 warheads)
- R-39 Rif (retired, 10 warheads)
- R-29RM Shtil (retired, 4 warheads)
- RT-23 Molodets (retired, 10 warheads)
- R-29RMU Sineva (active, 4 or 10 warheads)
- RS-24 Yars (active, 3-4 warheads)
- R-29RMU2 Layner (active, 4 or 12 warheads)
- RSM-56 Bulava (active 6-10 warheads)
- RS-28 Sarmat (active, 10-15 warheads)
- RS-26 Rubezh (development stopped, 4 warheads)
- BZhRK Barguzin (development stopped, 4-16 warheads)

United Kingdom

- UGM-133 Trident II (active, 8-12 warheads)

United States

- LGM-30 Minuteman III (active, 1-3 warheads, currently carries one warhead)
- UGM-73 Poseidon (retired, 10 or 14 warheads)
- UGM-96 Trident I (retired, 8 warheads)
- LGM-118 Peacekeeper (retired, 10 warheads)
- UGM-133 Trident II (active 8-12 warheads)

== See also ==
- Comparison of ICBMs
- DARPA Falcon Project
- List of ICBMs
- Maneuverable re-entry vehicle (MARV or MaRV)
- Missile Command—1980s video game in which MIRVs must be intercepted
- Multiple Kill Vehicle
