= JL-3 =

Submarine-launched ballistic missile

Julang-3 (JL-3)
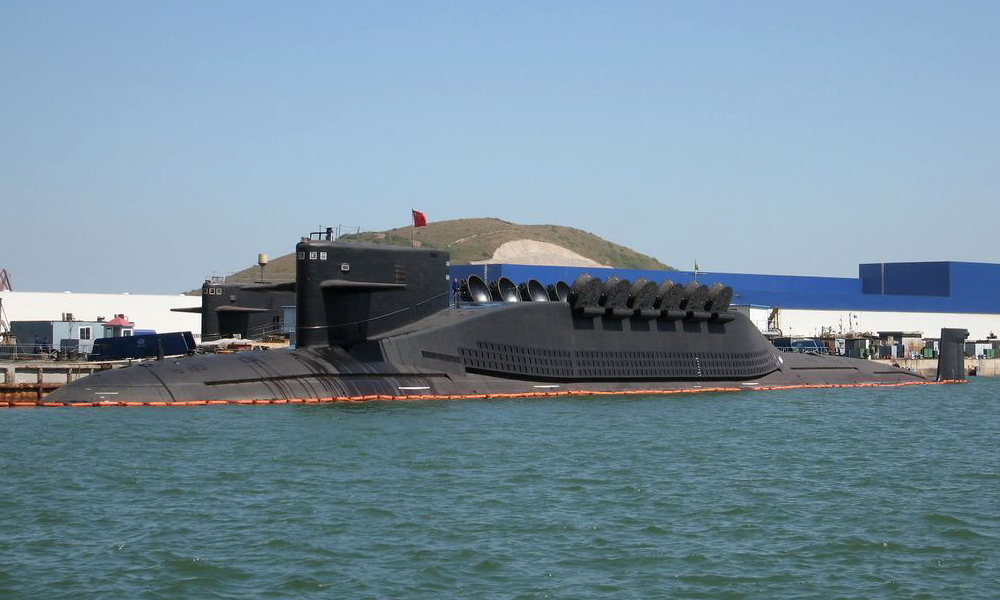
- Jin (type 94) class ballistic missile submarine
- Type: SLBM
- Place of origin: People's Republic of China

Service history
- In service: 2022
- Used by: People's Liberation Army Navy

Specifications
- Blast yield: 250kt-1mt
- Propellant: Solid-fuel rocket
- Operational range: >10,000 km (6,200 mi)
- Guidance system: Astro-inertial with Beidou
- Launch platform: Type 094 submarine

The JL-3 (Chinese: 巨浪-3; pinyin: Jù Làng Sān; lit. 'Giant Wave 3'; NATO reporting name: CSS-NX-20) is a Chinese third-generation intercontinental-range submarine-launched ballistic missile (SLBM). It may arm the Type 094 submarine and is expected to arm the future Type 096.

== History ==
The first test flight occurred on 24 November 2018 in the Bohai Sea; it was likely a test of the launch tube's cold-launch ejection system. According to anonymous Chinese sources, the Type 032 submarine made the first three test launches, with a Type 094 making the fourth in December 2019.

In 2020, anonymous Chinese sources reported that development of the JL-3 and Type 096 had been decoupled to speed up missile development, and that it would take at least five years to integrate the missile with the submarine.

By 2022, the Type 094 may have been rearmed with the JL-3. The missile officially debuted at the 2025 China Victory Day Parade.

On 6 July 2026, the People's Liberation Army Navy test-launched a submarine-launched ballistic missile, likely a JL-2 or JL-3, from a nuclear-powered submarine, into international waters in the South Pacific. This was China's second ballistic missile launch into international waters since 1980, following a DF-31 test in 2024. China gave limited advance notice of the launch. The Japan Coast Guard was informed a day in advance that China had designated a hazard area, including part of Japan's EEZ south of Wakayama Prefecture, for "falling space debris." However China's Ministry of National Defense clarified the involvement of a ballistic missile only about 90 minutes before launch. The Center for Strategic and International Studies, a US think tank, characterized China's launch notification protocols as weaker than the International Code of Conduct against Ballistic Missile Proliferation, to which China is not a party. Observers speculated that the launch was conducted by a Type 094 submarine using either a JL-2 or JL-3 submarine-launched ballistic missile.

== Description ==
The JL-3 is reported as a solid-fueled missile with ranges of over 9,000 km (5,600 mi) or 5,400 nmi (10,000 km), capable of reaching parts of contiguous United States when launched from China's coastal waters.

The Center for Strategic and International Studies reports the likely payload to be three MIRV nuclear warheads.

== See also ==
- Nuclear weapons of China
