= Type 094 submarine =

Chinese ballistic missile submarine class

- Profile of the Type 094

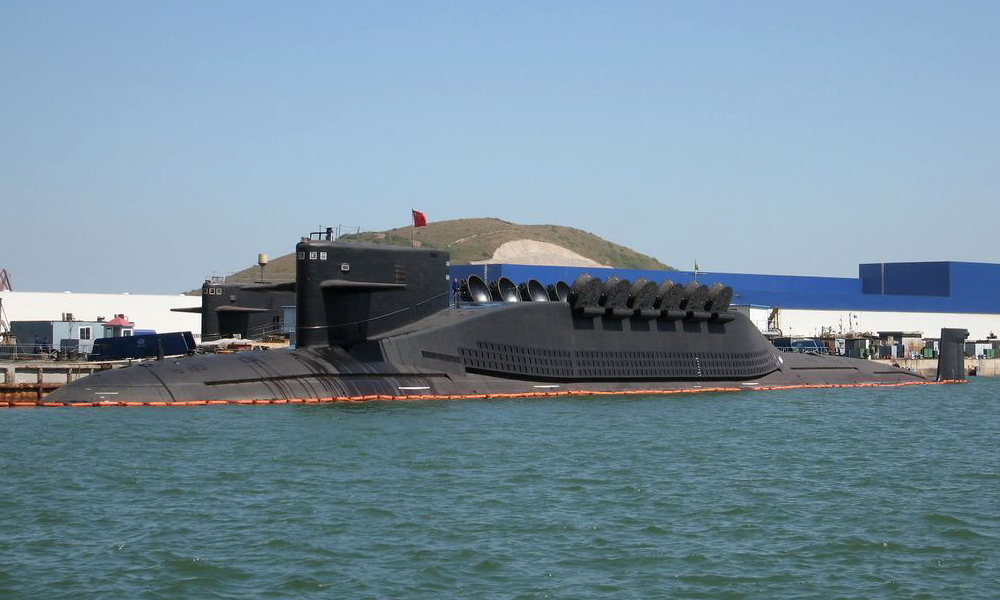
- Type 094 submarine

Class overview
- Name: Type 094
- Builders: Bohai Shipyard, Huludao, China
- Operators: People's Liberation Army Navy
- Preceded by: Type 092 submarine
- Succeeded by: Type 096
- Cost: $750 million per unit
- In commission: 2007–present
- Building: 2
- Active: 6

General characteristics
- Type: Ballistic missile submarine
- Displacement: 8,000 tonnes (7,900 long tons) surfaced; 11,000 tons submerged.
- Length: 137 m (449 ft 6 in)
- Beam: 13 m (42 ft 8 in)
- Propulsion: Nuclear, 1 shaft
- Speed: 30 knots (56 km/h; 35 mph) submerged (official)
- Range: Unlimited
- Test depth: 400 m
- Complement: 140
- Armament: Missiles: 12 JL-2 or JL-3 SLBM

The Type 094 (Chinese: 09-IV型核潜艇; Chinese designation: 09-IV; NATO reporting name: Jin class) is a class of nuclear-powered ballistic missile submarines developed by China for the People's Liberation Army Navy Submarine Force. The Type 094 succeeds the Type 092 submarine and precedes the Type 096 submarine, which is under development.

== Description ==
The Type 094's chief designer was Zhang Jinlin. This type is likely based on the Type 093 nuclear-powered attack submarine.

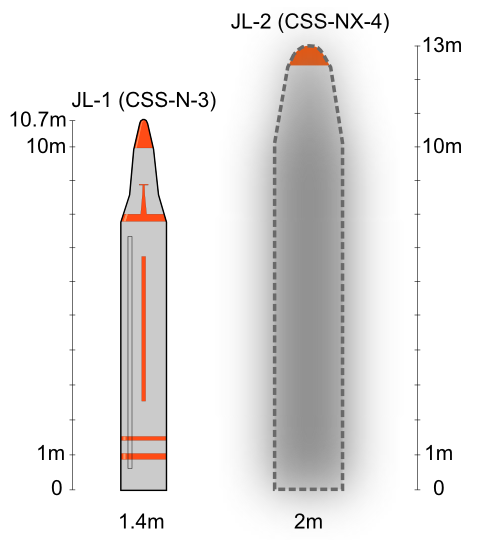
JL-1 and JL-2 missiles

The Type 094 is China's "first credible sea-based nuclear deterrent" according to the United States Department of Defense. They were initially armed with 12 JL-2 SLBMs; each missile had one warhead and a 7,200 km (4,500 mi) range capable of reaching parts of Alaska launched from near China. By late 2022, they may have been rearmed with JL-3 SLBMs able to reach the continental United States from the South China Sea; ranges of over 10,000 km (6,200 mi) have been reported.

Starting with the third boat, the sail was streamlined with a small cusp or fillet at the bottom of leading edge and a slight round down at the top of the sail. This was similar to the streamlining refitted to one of the first Type 093 submarines and likely did little to reduce overall drag.

The fifth and sixth boats reduced the number of limber holes to reduce noise at high speeds.

Popular reporting sometimes uses the designation "Type 094A" for boats starting with the third one; the designation appears not to be officially used by the PLAN.

=== Noise ===
The Type 094 is noisier than contemporary submarines. In 2004, a Chinese researcher reported that the Type 094 had an acoustic signature of 120 decibels, comparable to the Los Angeles-class submarine. In 2009, the Office of Naval Intelligence of the United States Navy listed the Type 094 as noisier than Soviet/Russian SSBNs from the late 1970s. In 2015, Australian researchers Brendan Thomas-Noone and Rorey Medcalf noted that noisiness and the range of the JL-2 limited the submarine's effectiveness in attacks on the contiguous United States, but not on India.

== Operational history ==
A Type 094 was photographed by commercial satellites in late 2006 at the Xiaopingdao Submarine Base. The first commissioned in 2007 and six were in commission in 2020. They began nuclear deterrence patrols in December 2015.

Type 094 boats have surfaced unexpectedly in public view without official explanation. In October 2017, a boat surfaced amidst a Vietnamese fishing fleet near the Paracel Islands, possibly due to a technical issue. Boats have also surfaced in the Taiwan Strait in 2020, 2021, and 2024.

== Boats ==
| Name | Hull no. | Builder | Laid down | Launched | Commissioned | Status |
|---|---|---|---|---|---|---|
| | 411 | Bohai Shipyard, Huludao | 2001 | 28 July 2004 | March 2007 | Active |
| Changzheng 10 | 412 | Bohai Shipyard, Huludao | 2003 | 2006 | 2010 | Active |
| Changzheng 11 | 413 | Bohai Shipyard, Huludao | 2004 | December 2009 | 2012 | Active |
| | | Bohai Shipyard, Huludao | 2006 | 2011 | 2015 | Active |
| | | Bohai Shipyard, Huludao | | 2017 | April 2020 | Active |
| Changzheng 18 | 421 | Bohai Shipyard, Huludao | | | 23 April 2021 | Active |
| | | Bohai Shipyard, Huludao | | 2024 | | |
| | | Bohai Shipyard, Huludao | | 2025 | | |

== See also ==
- List of submarine classes in service

== Sources ==
- Carlson, Christopher P.; Wang, Howard (August 2023). "A Brief Technical History of PLAN Nuclear Submarines". China Maritime Report (30). China Maritime Studies Institute.
- Erickson, Andrew S.; Goldstein, Lyle J. (2007). "China's Future Nuclear Submarine Force". Naval War College Review. 60 (1).
- Kirchberger, Sarah (September 2023). "China's Submarine Industrial Base: State-Led Innovation with Chinese Characteristics". China Maritime Report (31). China Maritime Studies Institute.
- The International Institute for Strategic Studies (2025). The Military Balance 2025. London: Routledge. ISBN 978-1-041-04967-8.
- Military and Security Developments Involving the People's Republic of China (PDF). Arlington, VA: United States Department of Defense. 2022.
