= DF-5 =

Chinese intercontinental ballistic missile

DF-5/CSS-4
- Type: ICBM
- Place of origin: People's Republic of China

Service history
- In service: 1981–present
- Used by: People's Liberation Army Rocket Force

Production history
- Manufacturer: Factory 211 (Capital Astronautics Machinery Co.)

Specifications
- Mass: 183 tonnes (183,000 kg)
- Length: 32.6 m (106 ft 11 in)
- Diameter: 3.35 m (11 ft 0 in)
- Warhead: One (DF-5 & DF-5A); MIRV (up to 10 warheads) (DF-5B & DF-5C)
- Blast yield: 4–5 Mt (non-MIRV warhead) or 5 x 425 Kt (MIRVs)
- Engine: Two-stage Liquid-propellant rocket (UDMH/NTO)
- Operational range: 13,000–20,000 km (8,100–12,400 mi)
- Maximum speed: Mach 22 (26,950 km/h; 16,745 mph; 7.486 km/s)
- Guidance system: Inertial
- Accuracy: ~800 m (2,600 ft) CEP
- Launch platform: Silo

The Dongfeng 5 (simplified Chinese: 东风-5; traditional Chinese: 東風-5; pinyin: Dōng Fēng Wǔ; lit. 'East Wind 5') or DF-5 is a Chinese second-generation two stage, silo-launched, liquid-propelled intercontinental ballistic missile. The most recent variant of the missile, the DF-5C, was first displayed at the 2025 China Victory Day Parade and is estimated to have a range of approximately 20,000 kilometres (12,000 mi) with the ability to carry up to 10 multiple independently targetable reentry vehicles (MIRVs).

The DF-5 had its first flight in 1971 and was in operational service 10 years later. One of the limitations of the missile is that it takes between 30 and 60 minutes to load with liquid fuel (UDMH) and NTO oxidizer. The missile was also used as the basis for the Long March 2 family of launch vehicles.

As of 2026, DF-5s in service are estimated at six DF-5A missiles assigned six warheads, and twelve DF-5B missiles assigned 60 warheads in MIRV configuration. It is unknown if the DF-5C is deployed. The DF-5B warhead, at 4.5 megatons, is one of the largest nuclear weapons still in service worldwide.

== History ==
DF 5

The DF-5 was designed under the leadership of Tu Shou'e (屠守锷) at the China Academy of Launch Technology (CALT); Li Xu'e [李绪鄂] served as deputy chief designer. The missile was produced at China's Factory 211 (Capital Astronautics Co. [首都航天机械公司], also known as the Capital Machine Factory [首都机械厂]).

The DF-5 was first flight tested in 1971, with final tests into the Pacific Ocean in May 1980. Two silo-based missiles were put into 'trial operational deployment' in 1981. Chinese leadership deemed the DF-5 crucial because "Although the number is not large, it can cover the entire Soviet Union [with its range of 9,000 kilometers]. If [Moscow] wants to attack us, it must consider twice."

Beginning in 1986 the Chinese started developing the improved DF-5A, with range increased to over 15,000 km and a more accurate guidance system.

The DF-5A upgrade increased the throw-weight of the system from 7,000 kg to 10,200 kg. DF-5A had its first flight test in 1991 and was finalized in 1995. The missile uses an inertial guidance system that provides a circular error probability (CEP) of 800 metres (2,600 ft).

The missile was also used as the basis for the Long March 2 family of launch vehicles.

== Deployment ==
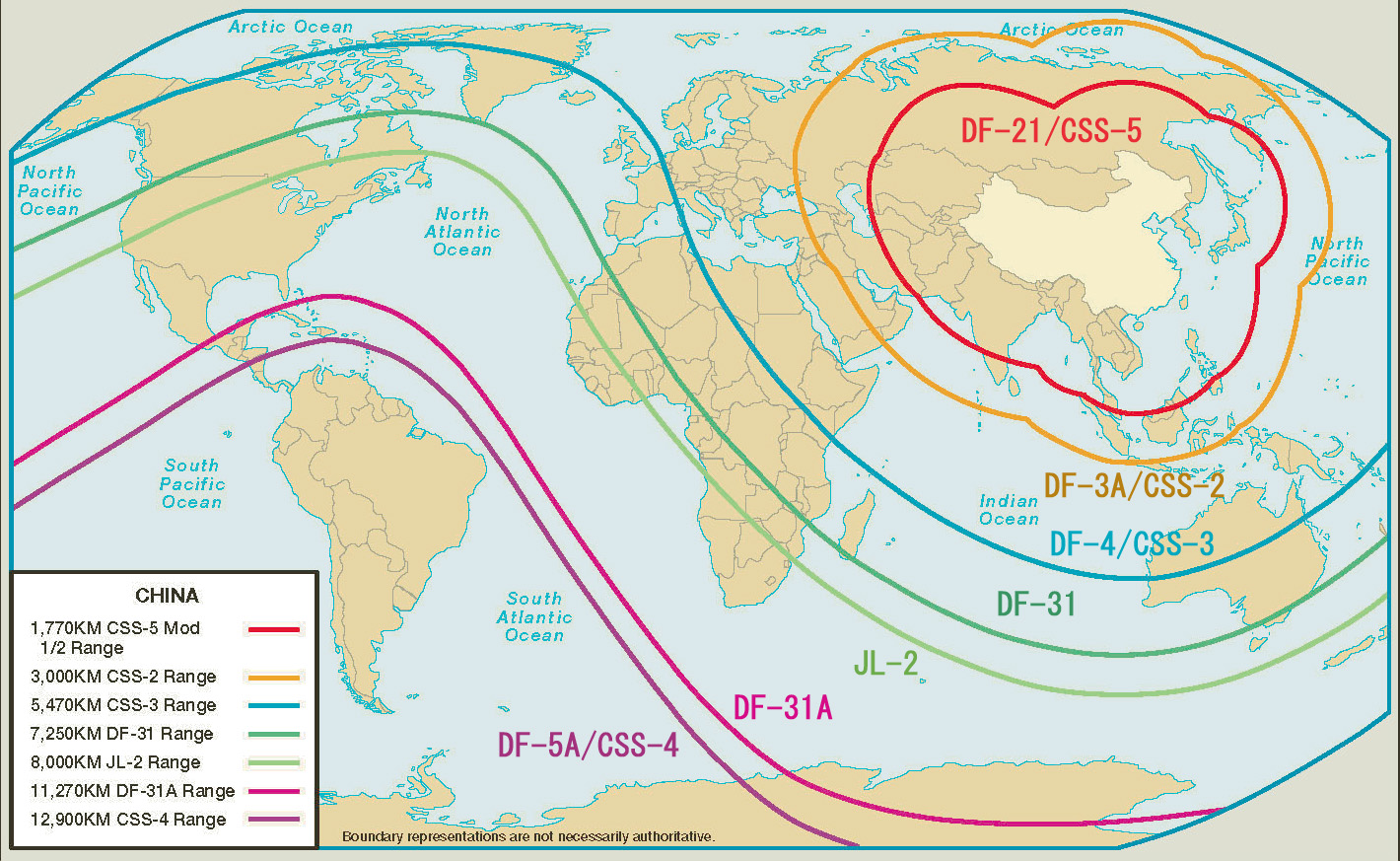
DF-5 range (2007 estimation)

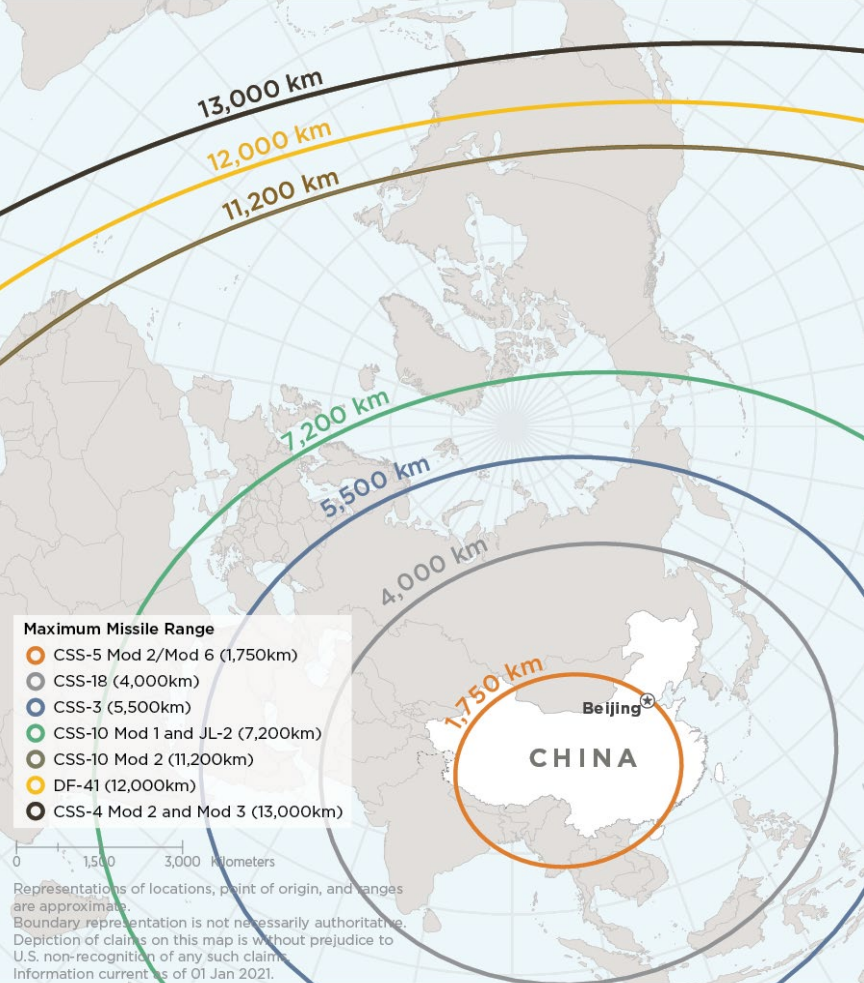
DF-5 (CSS-4) range (2021 estimation)

As with the DF-4, initially the DF-5 was stored in a horizontal position in tunnels under high mountains, and are launched immediately outside the mouth of the tunnel. The missiles must be moved into the open and fueled prior to firing, an operational mode dubbed chu men fang pao (firing a cannon outdoors), with the fueling operation apparently requiring about two hours. The initial deployment of a pair of DF-5s in silos in Central China was completed in 1981. That portion of the DF-5A force that is deployed in silos could be maintained in a ready-to-fire status. In order to enhance the survivability of these missiles, China has constructed a large number of decoy silos which consist of shallow holes excavations with headworks that resemble operational silos.

According to the US National Air and Space Intelligence Center, as of 1998 the deployed DF-5 force consisted of "about 25" missiles. From early 1999 to 2008 the total deployed DF-5 force was generally estimated at 20 missiles, according to the 2008 China Military Power Report. As of 2017, there were about 20 operational DF-5 launchers.

== Variants ==
=== DF-5B ===
According to the 2015 China Military Power Report, the DF-5B was capable of carrying an unspecified number of multiple independently targetable reentry vehicles (MIRVs). An improved version, named DF-5B, was shown to the public during the 2015 China Victory Day Parade.

=== DF-5C ===
China began testing the DF-5C variant of the missile in 2017. It was publicly displayed during the 2025 China Victory Day Parade and has an estimated range of 20,000 kilometres (12,000 mi) and can carry up to 10multiple independently targetable reentry vehicles (MIRVs). Chinese state media stated that the DF-5C has the capability to conduct global strikes.

== Gallery ==
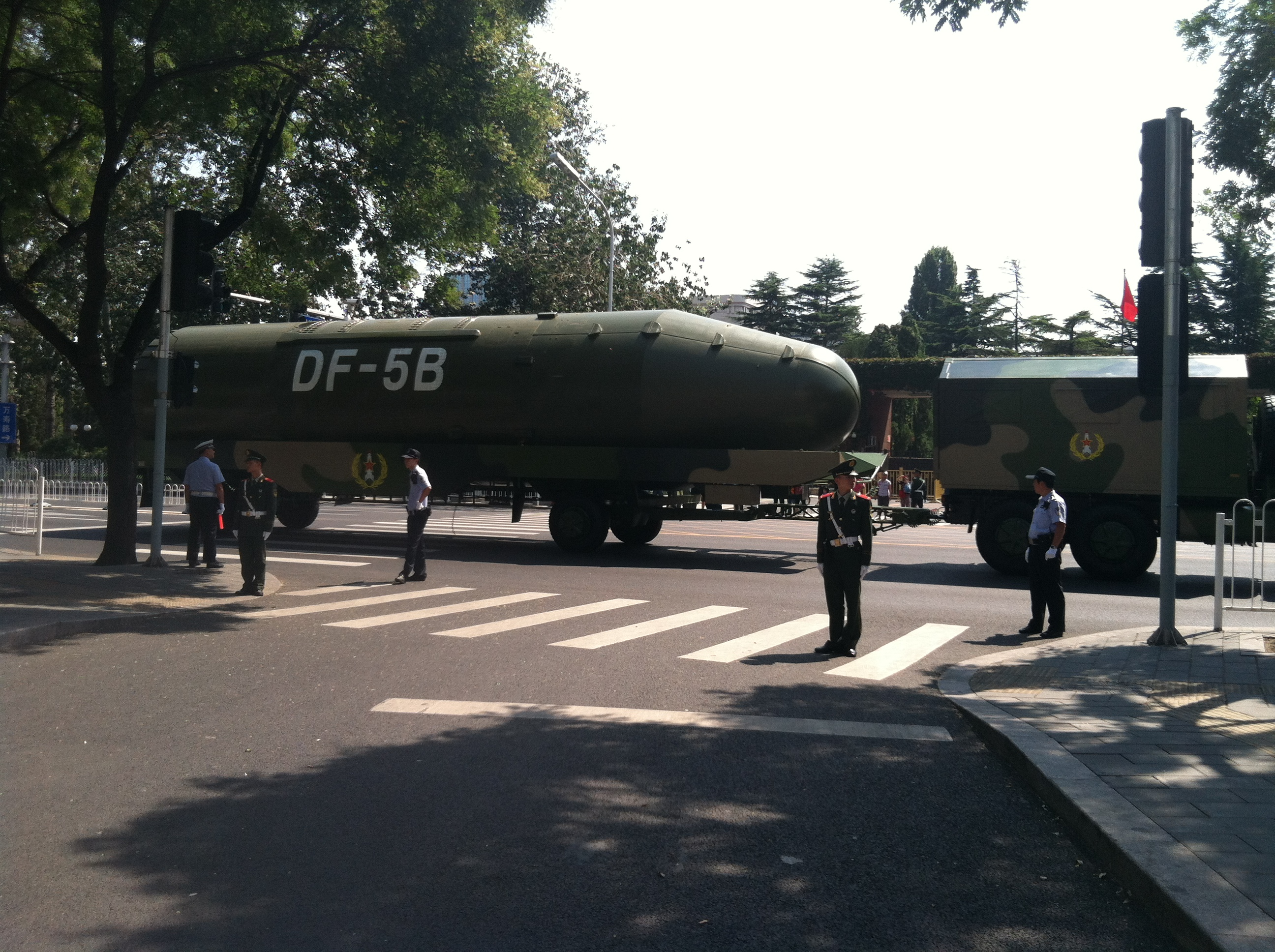

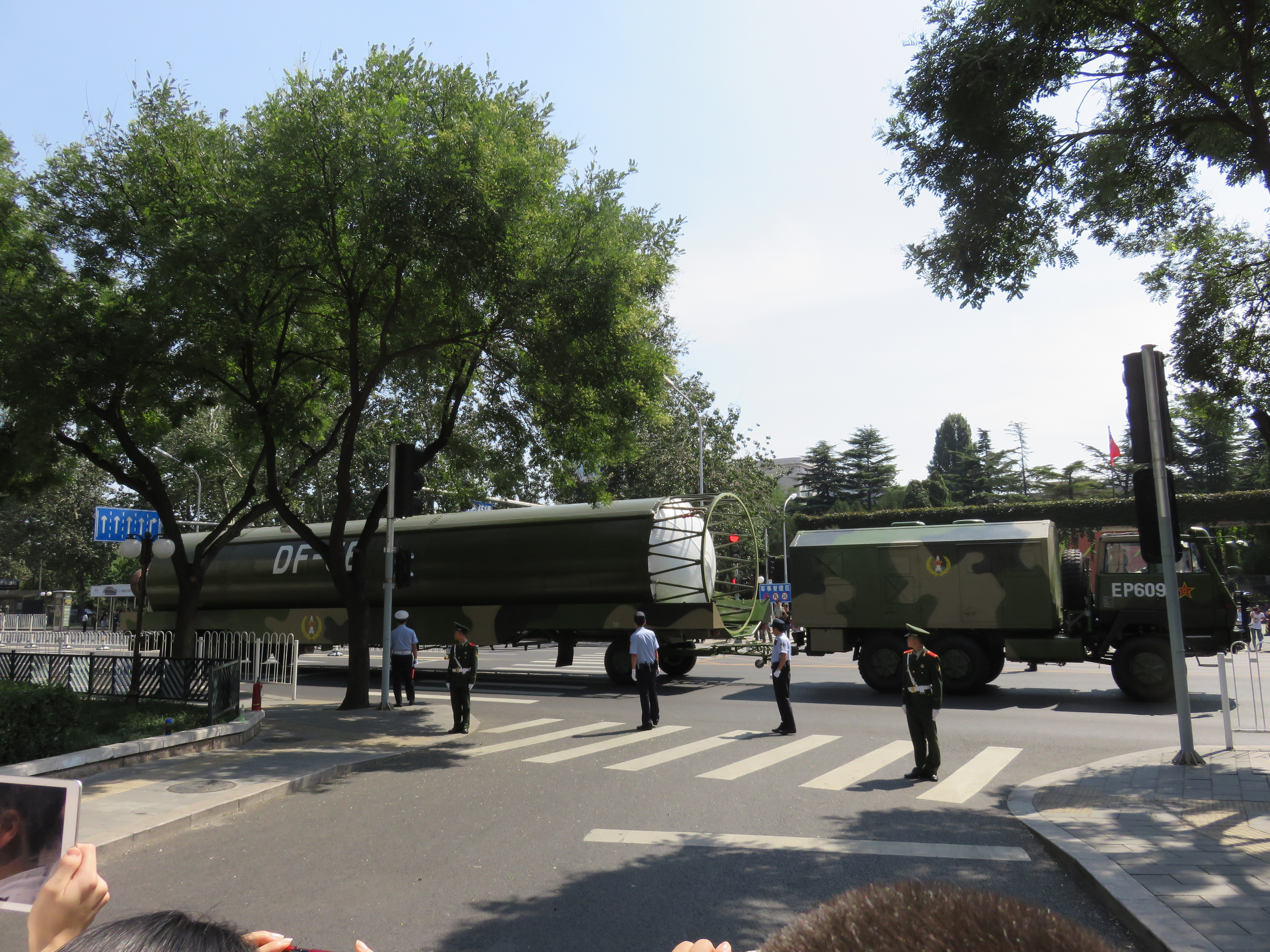
First stage of the DF-5B

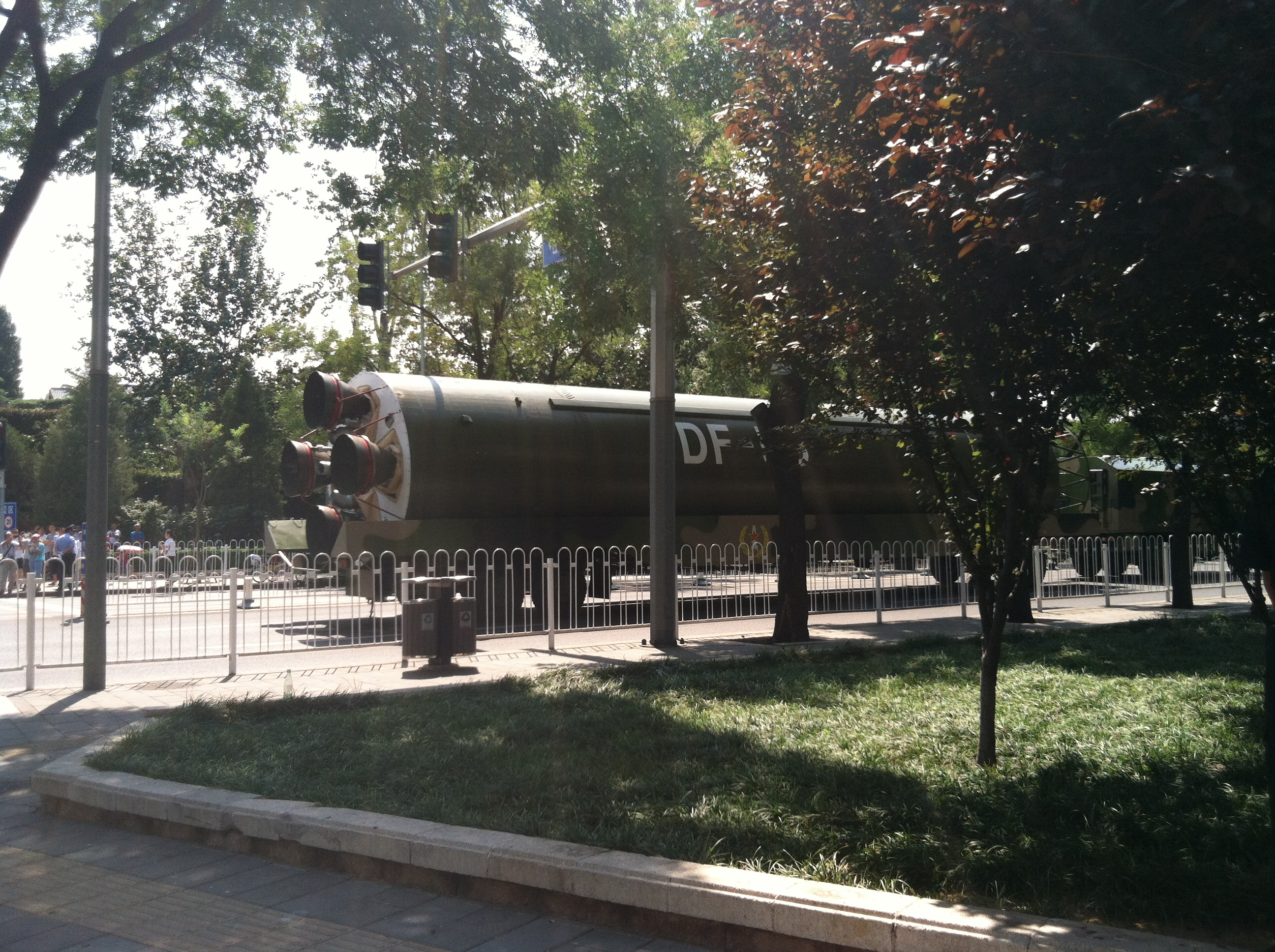
Another view of the first stage

== Operators ==
- China: The People's Liberation Army Rocket Force is the only operator of the DF-5.

== See also ==
- Nuclear weapons of China

Preceded by DF-4	DF-5; 1999-	Succeeded by DF-21
