= JL-2 =

Chinese submarine-launched ballistic missile

Julang-2 (JL-2)
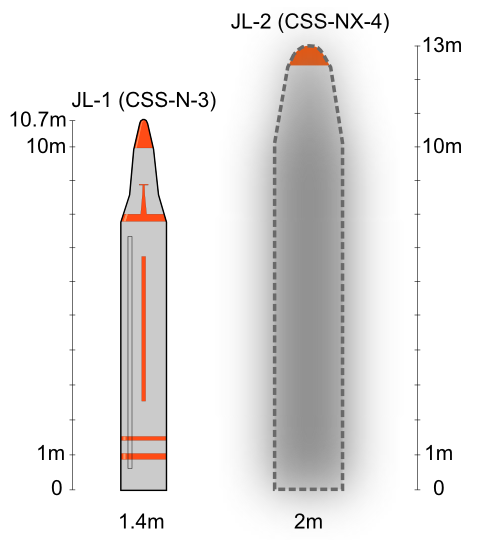
- Type: SLBM
- Place of origin: People's Republic of China

Service history
- In service: Active as of 2015
- Used by: People's Liberation Army Navy

Specifications
- Mass: 42,000 kilograms (93,000 lb)
- Length: 13 metres (43 ft)
- Warhead: single or 3-8 MIRV nuclear warhead
- Blast yield: 1 megaton of TNT (4.2 PJ) single, 20/90/150kt
- Propellant: Solid-fuel rocket
- Operational range: 3,900 nmi (7,200 km)
- Guidance system: Astro-inertial with satellite-based updates
- Launch platform: Type 094 submarine

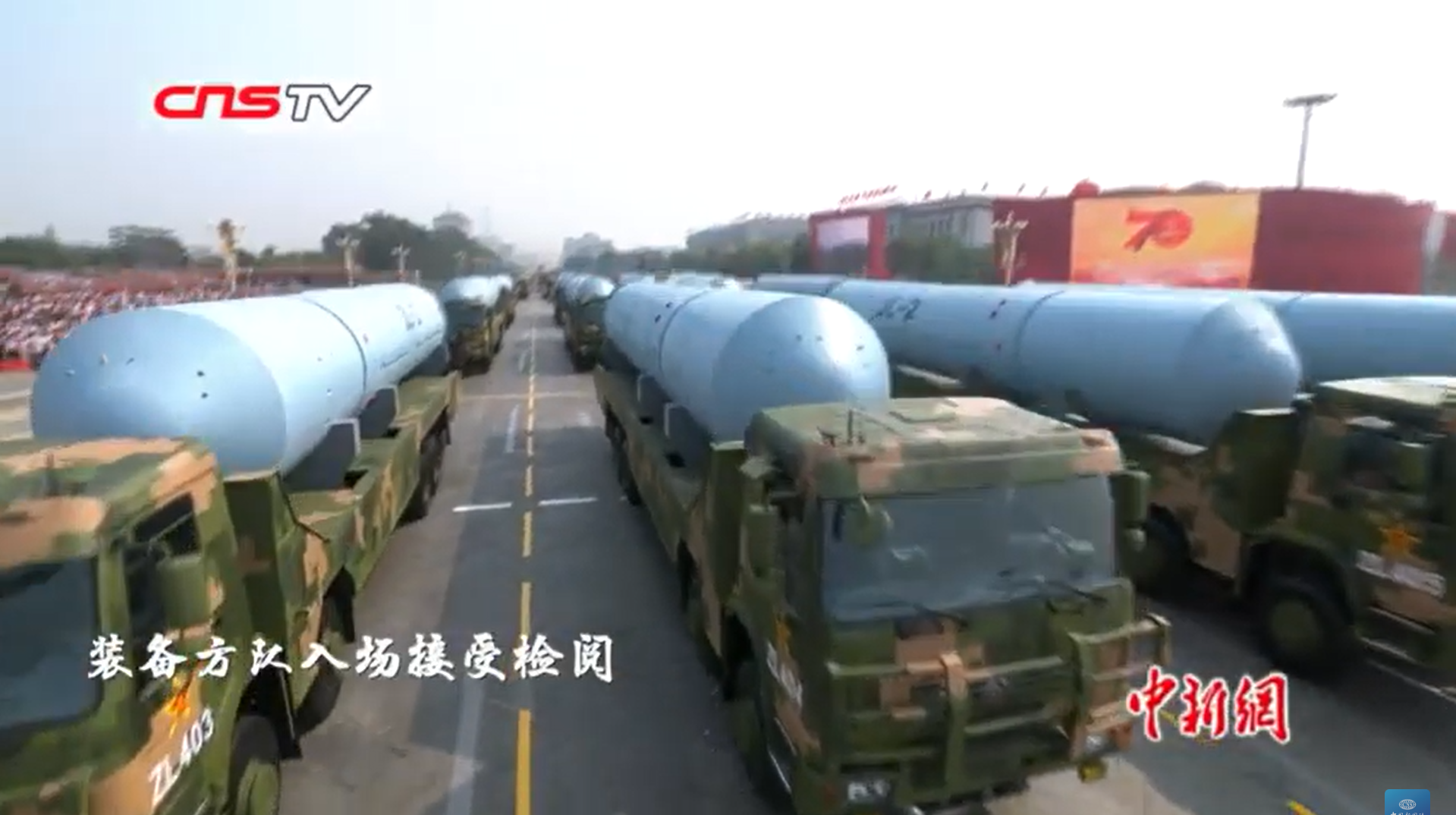
JL-2 at 70th anniversary of the People's Republic of China

The JL-2 (Chinese: 巨浪-2; pinyin: Jù Làng Èr; lit. 'Giant Wave 2', NATO reporting name CSS-N-14) is a Chinese second-generation intercontinental-range submarine-launched ballistic missile (SLBM) deployed on the People's Liberation Army Navy's (PLAN) Type 094 submarines.

The JL-2 provides China with its first viable sea-based nuclear deterrent.

== Development ==
The JL-2 was developed as part of a larger program to replace the liquid-fuelled ballistic missiles developed from 1965 with solid-fuelled missiles. The JL-2 was the SLBM variant of the land-based DF-31. Development of both missiles began in the mid-1980s, with the SLBM having less priority. The first JL-2 at-sea launch occurred in 2001 from a Type 031 submarine. The missile suffered a series of testing failures. A successful test cycle was achieved in 2012.

During the development of the missile, it was reported that China was considering modifying the missile to accommodate an anti-satellite warhead to give it a sea-based anti-satellite capability.

Type 094 deterrence patrols with JL-2 missiles began in December 2015. Each submarine may carry 12 missiles.

== Description ==
The JL-2 is a three-stage, solid-fueled missile, with a maximum range of 3,900 nmi (7,200 km). It carries a single 1 megaton warhead. According to the Center for Strategic and International Studies, the missile may carry 3-8 MIRVs with yields of 20, 90, or 150 kilotons.

== Sources ==
- Descisciolo, Dominic (2005). "China's Space Development and Nuclear Strategy". In Goldstein, Lyle J. (ed.). China's Nuclear Force Modernization. Newport Papers. Naval War College Press. ISSN 1544-6824.
- Logan, David C. (2019). "Making Sense of China's Missile Forces". In Saunders, Phillip C.; Ding, Arthur S.; Scobell, Andrew; Yang, Andrew N.D.; Joel, Wuthnow (eds.). Chairman Xi Remakes the PLA: Assessing Chinese Military Reforms. Washington, D.C.: National Defense University Press. ISBN 978-1070233420.
- Military and Security Developments Involving the People's Republic of China 2024 (PDF) (Report). United States Department of Defense. 2024.
- Ballistic and Cruise Missile Threat (PDF) (Report). United States National Air and Space Intelligence Center. July 2020.
