= Meanings of minor-planet names: 212001–213000 =

As minor planet discoveries are confirmed, they are given a permanent number by the IAU's Minor Planet Center (MPC), and the discoverers can then submit names for them, following the IAU's naming conventions. The list below concerns those minor planets in the specified number-range that have received names, and explains the meanings of those names.

Official naming citations of newly named small Solar System bodies are approved and published in a bulletin by IAU's Working Group for Small Bodies Nomenclature (WGSBN). Before May 2021, citations were published in MPC's Minor Planet Circulars for many decades. Recent citations can also be found on the JPL Small-Body Database (SBDB). Until his death in 2016, German astronomer Lutz D. Schmadel compiled these citations into the Dictionary of Minor Planet Names (DMP) and regularly updated the collection.

Based on Paul Herget's The Names of the Minor Planets, Schmadel also researched the unclear origin of numerous asteroids, most of which had been named prior to World War II. This article incorporates text from this source, which is in the public domain: SBDB New namings may only be added to this list below after official publication as the preannouncement of names is condemned. The WGSBN publishes a comprehensive guideline for the naming rules of non-cometary small Solar System bodies.

== 212001–212100 ==
Named minor planet	Provisional	This minor planet was named for...	Ref · Catalog
212073 Carlzimmer	2005 EF_{65}	Carl Zimmer (born 1966) is a world-renowned popular science writer and science advocate. He has authored over a dozen science related books covering topics such as viruses, evolution, and heredity.	IAU · 212073

== 212101–212200 ==
back to top

Named minor planet	Provisional	This minor planet was named for...	Ref · Catalog
212121 Marthegautier	2005 EP_{195}	Marthe Gautier, French medical doctor.	IAU · 212121
212176 Fabriziospaziani	2005 GV_{60}	Fabrizio Spaziani (1963–2012), Italian anaesthetist, posthumously awarded the Italian gold medal for civil merit	JPL · 212176

== 212201–212300 ==
back to top

Named minor planet	Provisional	This minor planet was named for...	Ref · Catalog
212215 Mallorykinczyk	2005 GH_{197}	Mallory J. Kinczyk (b. 1989), an American planetary scientist.	IAU · 212215

== 212301–212400 ==
back to top

Named minor planet	Provisional	This minor planet was named for...	Ref · Catalog
212373 Pietrocascella	2006 HL_{17}	Pietro Cascella (1921–2008) was an Italian sculptor, painter and ceramist. His greatest work is the monument at Auschwitz.	JPL · 212373
212374 Vellerat	2006 HG_{18}	The Swiss village of Vellerat, located at the bottom of a mountain range in the canton of Jura, between the towns of Delemont and Moutier	JPL · 212374
212392 Peterkollmann	2006 HE_{140}	Peter Kollmann (b. 1983), a senior scientist at the Johns Hopkins Applied Physics Laboratory.	IAU · 212392

== 212401–212500 ==
back to top

Named minor planet	Provisional	This minor planet was named for...	Ref · Catalog
212403 Marthakusterer	2006 JQ_{60}	Martha B. Kusterer (b. 1957), an American senior software engineer retired from the Johns Hopkins University Applied Physics Laboratory	IAU · 212403
212465 Goroshky	2006 QD_{40}	Goroshky settlement, currently Volodarsk-Volynsky, museum of decorative and precious stones in Ukraine.	JPL · 212465
212500 Robertojoppolo	2006 RT	Roberto Joppolo (born 1939) is an Italian sculptor. His main works are statues and church doors realized in bronze.	JPL · 212500

== 212501–212600 ==
back to top

Named minor planet	Provisional	This minor planet was named for...	Ref · Catalog
212501 Deniserichards	2006 RK_{6}	Denise Richards, American actress, model, and TV personality.	IAU · 212501
212587 Bartasiute	2006 SQ_{161}	Stanislava Bartasiute (born 1953), associate professor at the Astronomical Observatory of Vilnius University.	JPL · 212587

== 212601–212700 ==
back to top

Named minor planet	Provisional	This minor planet was named for...	Ref · Catalog
212606 Janulis	2006 SF_{285}	Rimvydas Janulis (born 1953), a Lithuanian astronomer	JPL · 212606
212631 Hsinchu	2006 TW_{56}	Hsinchu is a city in northern Taiwan, popularly nicknamed "The Windy City" for its windy climate. Hsinchu Science Park is renowned as the Silicon Valley of Asia.	JPL · 212631
212692 Lazauskaite	2007 FT_{20}	Romualda Lazauskaite (born 1961), a Lithuanian astronomer	JPL · 212692

== 212701–212800 ==
back to top

Named minor planet	Provisional	This minor planet was named for...	Ref · Catalog
212705 Friûl	2007 RF_{15}	Friuli (also known as "Friûl" in the Friulian language) is an area of northeast Italy with its own particular cultural and historical identity. It comprises the major part of the autonomous region of Friuli-Venezia Giulia, and is the place where the discovering Remanzacco Observatory is located. The name Friuli originates from the ancient Roman town of Forum Iulii.	JPL · 212705
212723 Klitschko	2007 RN_{138}	The Klitschko brothers, Vitali (born 1971) and Wladimir (born 1976), widely known Ukrainian heavyweight boxers and philanthropists	JPL · 212723
212795 Fangjiancheng	2007 TD_{247}	Fang Jiancheng (born 1965), is an academician of the Chinese Academy of Sciences. He has been recognized as a leader in Inertial Instrument and System Technology, and the founder of theory and practice of Magnetically Suspended Inertial Actuators in China.	JPL · 212795
212796 Guoyonghuai	2007 TE_{247}	Guo Yonghuai (1909–1968), a professor at University of Science and Technology of China, served as the first dean of the Department of Chemical Physics. He was one of the founders of modern mechanics in China, and made significant contributions to mechanics, applied mathematics and aeronautics.	JPL · 212796
212797 Lipei	2007 TG_{247}	Li Pei (1917–2017), a professor at University of Science and Technology of China and a famous linguist, made significant contributions to the foreign language teaching and research. She was honored as "the mother of Chinese applied linguistics".	JPL · 212797

== 212801–212900 ==
back to top

Named minor planet	Provisional	This minor planet was named for...	Ref · Catalog
There are no named minor planets in this number range

== 212901–213000 ==
back to top

Named minor planet	Provisional	This minor planet was named for...	Ref · Catalog
212924 Yurishevchuk	2008 AK_{1}	Yuri Shevchuk (born 1957), Russian poet, composer and producer, cult rock performer and long-time leader of the rock band DDT.	JPL · 212924
212929 Satovski	2008 AD_{112}	Boris Satovski (1908–1982), Russian inventor, scientist and laureate of the USSR State Prize	JPL · 212929
212977 Birutė	2009 CT_{3}	Birutė (died 1382) was the second wife of Kęstutis, Grand Duke of Lithuania, and mother of Vytautas the Great. There is very little known about Birutė's life, but after her death a strong cult devoted to her developed among Lithuanians.	JPL · 212977
212981 Majalitović	2009 CH_{51}	Maja Litović Crnić (born 1958), a Croatian amateur astronomer	JPL · 212981
212991 Garcíalorca	2009 DE_{30}	Federico García Lorca (1898–1936), Spanish poet, dramatist and theater director	JPL · 212991
212998 Tolbachik	3931 T-3	Tolbachik, the complex volcano on the Kamchatka Peninsula in the Russian Far East. The highest summit rises to 3182 meters.	JPL · 212998

back to top

Preceded by 211,001–212,000	Meanings of minor-planet names List of minor planets: 212,001–213,000	Succeeded by 213,001–214,000
