= Li Pei =

Chinese linguist

- 李佩
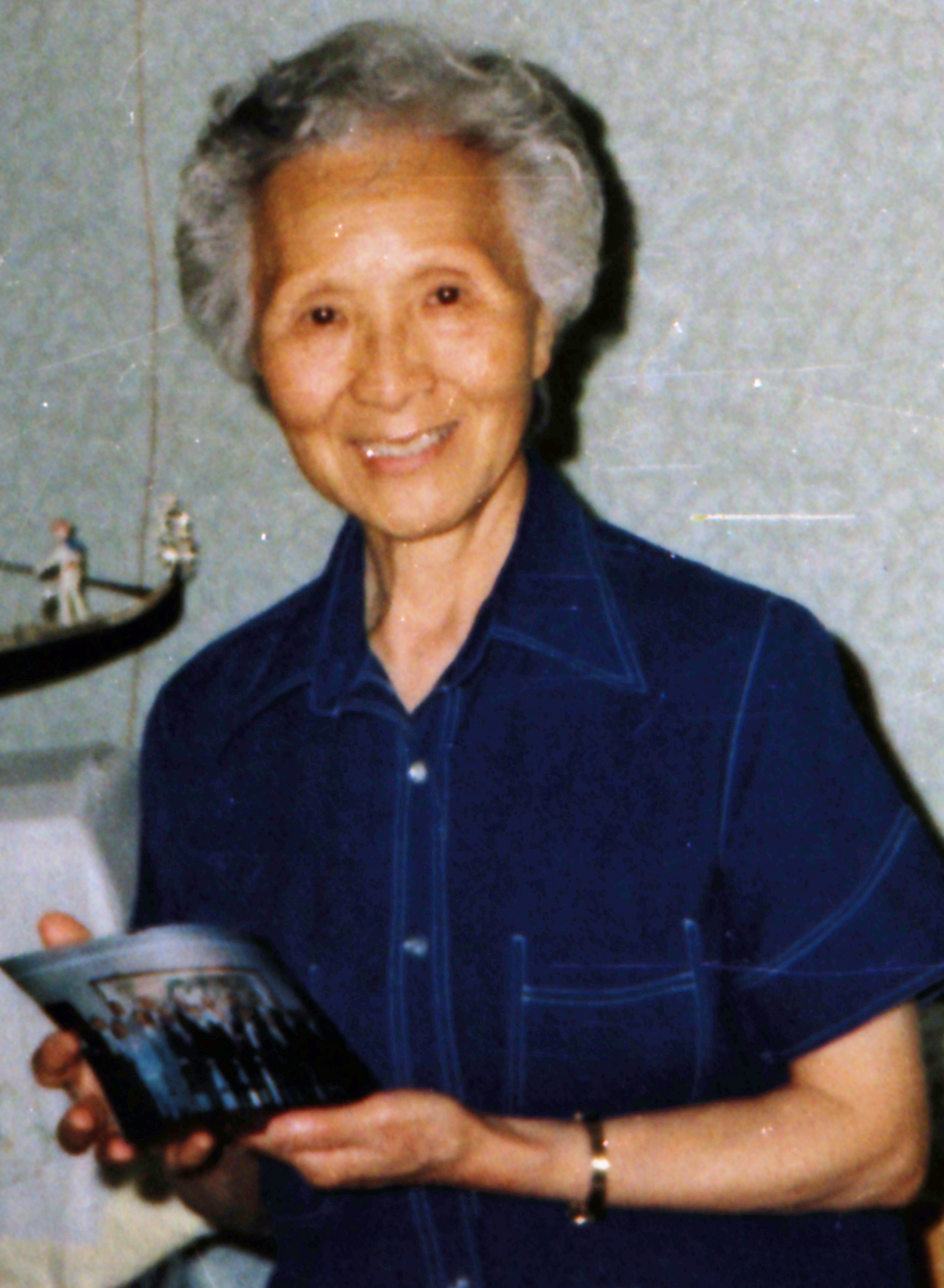
- Born: December 20, 1917; Zhenjiang, Jiangsu, Republic of China
- Died: January 12, 2017 (aged 99); Beijing, China
- Spouse: Guo Yonghuai

Academic background
- Education: Peking University; Cornell University

Academic work
- Discipline: Linguist
- Sub-discipline: English linguistics
- Institutions: University of Science and Technology of China; University of Chinese Academy of Sciences

Li Pei (Chinese: 李佩; December 20, 1917 – January 12, 2017), was a Chinese linguist and professor of English.

== Biography ==
Born in Zhenjiang, Jiangsu, She majored in economics at Peking University in 1936. In 1947, she studied at Cornell University in the U.S. where, she met and married Guo Yonghuai who became later one of the founding fathers of China's nuclear bomb. Li and Guo returned to China from the U.S. in 1956.

In 1961, Li started teaching English language at the University of Science and Technology of China. In 1978, she was transferred to the university's graduate school (Renamed to University of Chinese Academy of Sciences) and served as the dean of the English Department until her retirement at 70.

In 1998, Li initiated the "Zhongguancun Lecture Hall". She organized more than 600 weekend lectures given by notable scholars from many horizons, including economist Li Yining from Peking University and historian Zi Zhongyun from Chinese Academy of Social Sciences.

During the Cultural Revolution, Li was isolated and placed under surveillance for years. Her husband died in an airplane crash in 1968 and her only daughter died of disease in 1997. These tragedies won her a reputation for being mentally strong.

Li was also an active philanthropist in her twilight years; she gave away all her life-time savings (approx. US$90,000) to her university, to the aid of victims of natural disasters, to the education for special needs children and to the conservation of traditional performing arts.

After her death, her story went viral on Chinese Internet and traditional media, she was praised by netizens as "the final aristocrat in China" in contrast to the lavish lifestyle of today's Chinese society. Eight hundred people attended her funeral service. In an editorial appeared on the day after, a liberal-oriented newspaper China Youth Daily wondered, whether "Li Pei had taken away with her life an age". According to the official obituary released by the University of Chinese Academy of Sciences, Li dedicated her life to the education of groups of brilliant young people.

In 2018, the asteroid 212797 Lipei was named in her memory.
