= Guo Yonghuai =

Chinese aerospace engineer (1909–1968)

Guo Yonghuai Yung-Huai Kuo
- 郭永怀
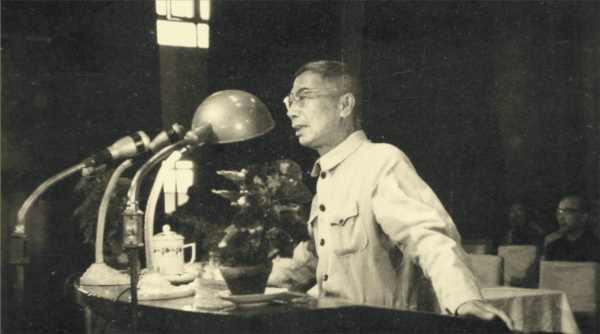
- Guo in 1961
- Born: 4 April 1909; Rongcheng, Shandong, China
- Died: 5 December 1968 (aged 59); Beijing, China
- Education: Nankai University; Peking University; University of Toronto; California Institute of Technology (PhD)
- Spouse: Li Pei
- Awards: Two Bombs and One Satellite Achievement Medal (1999)
- Scientific career
- Fields: Aerodynamics
- Thesis: Two-dimensional irrotational mixed subsonic and supersonic flow of a compressible fluid and the upper critical mach number (1944)
- Doctoral advisor: Theodore von Kármán

Guo Yonghuai (also spelled Yung-Huai Kuo, Chinese: 郭永怀; April 4, 1909 – December 5, 1968) was a Chinese aerospace engineer and aerodynamics scientist.

== Biography ==
Guo was born in Rongcheng, Shandong. He started his undergraduate education at Nankai University in 1930, transferred to the department of physics at Peking University in 1933, and graduated from Peking University in 1935. He enrolled in an oversea program in 1939 and entered the University of Toronto in Canada in 1940 and obtained a master's degree there. From 1941 to 1945, Guo studied compressible hydrodynamics at the California Institute of Technology. After obtaining a Doctor of Philosophy degree in aeronautics, he stayed there as a research fellow. From 1946, he became an associate professor and later, professor at Cornell University. Invited by Qian Xuesen, Guo returned to China in October 1956 and became the vice director of the Institute of Mechanics of the Chinese Academy of Sciences.

Guo was a founder of mechanics in mainland China and made significant contributions to mechanics, applied mathematics and aeronautics. In 1958, he helped found the University of Science and Technology of China and served as the chair of the department of Chemical Physics.

Beginning in May 1960, Guo served as vice director of the Beijing Ninth Research Institute of the Second Ministry of Industry, and became a leader of China's atomic and hydrogen bomb projects. He led work in explosive mechanics, high-pressure physical property equations, aerodynamics, aeronautics, structural mechanics, and weapon experimental environment, and solved a series of important problems. In December 1982, China's Science Press published The Works of Guo Yonghuai.

Guo married the linguist Li Pei. They had one daughter. He died of a plane crash near Beijing Capital International Airport on December 5, 1968, when traveling from Qinghai to Beijing. When crashing, he and his guard, Mou Fangdong, protected the data from being destroyed.

== Awards and honors ==
In 1985, he was awarded a Grand Prize of National Science and Technology Advancement. In 1999, Guo won the Two Bombs, One Satellite Achievement Medal. In 2018, the asteroid 212796 Guoyonghuai was named in his memory.
