= List of minor planets: 212001–213000 =

The following is a partial list of minor planets, running from minor-planet number 212001 through 213000, inclusive. The primary data for this and other partial lists is based on JPL's "Small-Body Orbital Elements" and data available from the Minor Planet Center. Critical list information is also provided by the MPC, unless otherwise specified from Lowell Observatory. A detailed description of the table's columns and additional sources are given on the main page including a complete list of every page in this series, and a statistical break-up on the dynamical classification of minor planets.

Also see the summary list of all named bodies in numerical and alphabetical order, and the corresponding naming citations for the number range of this particular list. New namings may only be added to this list after official publication, as the preannouncement of names is condemned by the Working Group for Small Bodies Nomenclature of the International Astronomical Union.

Near-Earth obj.	MBA (inner)	MBA (outer)	Centaur
Mars-crosser	MBA (middle)	Jupiter trojan	Trans-Neptunian obj.
Unclassified

== 212001–212100 ==
Designation			Discovery			Properties		Ref
Permanent	Provisional	Named after	Date	Site	Discoverer(s)	Category	Diam.	Ref
212001	2005 BX_{9}	—	January 16, 2005	Socorro	LINEAR	·	1.3 km	MPC · JPL
212002	2005 BU_{10}	—	January 16, 2005	Kitt Peak	Spacewatch	V	1.0 km	MPC · JPL
212003	2005 BL_{11}	—	January 16, 2005	Kitt Peak	Spacewatch	MAS	1.1 km	MPC · JPL
212004	2005 BC_{13}	—	January 17, 2005	Socorro	LINEAR	·	3.2 km	MPC · JPL
212005	2005 BW_{16}	—	January 16, 2005	Socorro	LINEAR	NYS	1.4 km	MPC · JPL
212006	2005 BM_{22}	—	January 16, 2005	Kitt Peak	Spacewatch	·	1.6 km	MPC · JPL
212007	2005 BC_{24}	—	January 17, 2005	Catalina	CSS	·	1.8 km	MPC · JPL
212008	2005 BU_{24}	—	January 17, 2005	Socorro	LINEAR	·	2.0 km	MPC · JPL
212009	2005 BD_{27}	—	January 20, 2005	Socorro	LINEAR	PHO	1.7 km	MPC · JPL
212010	2005 BH_{33}	—	January 16, 2005	Mauna Kea	Veillet, C.	·	1.5 km	MPC · JPL
212011	2005 CM_{2}	—	February 1, 2005	Catalina	CSS	NYS	1.7 km	MPC · JPL
212012	2005 CV_{2}	—	February 1, 2005	Kitt Peak	Spacewatch	NYS	1.8 km	MPC · JPL
212013	2005 CO_{4}	—	February 1, 2005	Kitt Peak	Spacewatch	·	2.6 km	MPC · JPL
212014	2005 CX_{4}	—	February 1, 2005	Catalina	CSS	NYS	2.3 km	MPC · JPL
212015	2005 CJ_{6}	—	February 1, 2005	Kitt Peak	Spacewatch	NYS	1.5 km	MPC · JPL
212016	2005 CA_{11}	—	February 1, 2005	Kitt Peak	Spacewatch	·	1.6 km	MPC · JPL
212017	2005 CP_{11}	—	February 1, 2005	Kitt Peak	Spacewatch	·	1.4 km	MPC · JPL
212018	2005 CG_{13}	—	February 2, 2005	Kitt Peak	Spacewatch	V	900 m	MPC · JPL
212019	2005 CJ_{13}	—	February 2, 2005	Kitt Peak	Spacewatch	·	1.6 km	MPC · JPL
212020	2005 CD_{14}	—	February 2, 2005	Kitt Peak	Spacewatch	·	2.9 km	MPC · JPL
212021	2005 CK_{15}	—	February 2, 2005	Socorro	LINEAR	·	1.7 km	MPC · JPL
212022	2005 CY_{15}	—	February 2, 2005	Socorro	LINEAR	MAS	860 m	MPC · JPL
212023	2005 CE_{19}	—	February 2, 2005	Catalina	CSS	NYS	1.4 km	MPC · JPL
212024	2005 CZ_{20}	—	February 2, 2005	Catalina	CSS	NYS	2.0 km	MPC · JPL
212025	2005 CZ_{21}	—	February 3, 2005	Socorro	LINEAR	NYS	1.4 km	MPC · JPL
212026	2005 CY_{22}	—	February 1, 2005	Catalina	CSS	·	1.8 km	MPC · JPL
212027	2005 CV_{24}	—	February 4, 2005	Catalina	CSS	·	2.1 km	MPC · JPL
212028	2005 CT_{26}	—	February 1, 2005	Kitt Peak	Spacewatch	·	1.4 km	MPC · JPL
212029	2005 CW_{27}	—	February 3, 2005	Goodricke-Pigott	R. A. Tucker	·	1.6 km	MPC · JPL
212030	2005 CG_{30}	—	February 1, 2005	Kitt Peak	Spacewatch	NYS	1.4 km	MPC · JPL
212031	2005 CH_{36}	—	February 3, 2005	Socorro	LINEAR	·	2.8 km	MPC · JPL
212032	2005 CL_{36}	—	February 3, 2005	Socorro	LINEAR	NYS	1.4 km	MPC · JPL
212033	2005 CY_{36}	—	February 1, 2005	Catalina	CSS	·	1.2 km	MPC · JPL
212034	2005 CC_{38}	—	February 7, 2005	Altschwendt	Altschwendt	·	1.5 km	MPC · JPL
212035	2005 CU_{45}	—	February 2, 2005	Kitt Peak	Spacewatch	NYS	1.6 km	MPC · JPL
212036	2005 CZ_{50}	—	February 2, 2005	Socorro	LINEAR	·	1.7 km	MPC · JPL
212037	2005 CF_{51}	—	February 2, 2005	Catalina	CSS	NYS	1.6 km	MPC · JPL
212038	2005 CW_{52}	—	February 3, 2005	Socorro	LINEAR	NYS	2.1 km	MPC · JPL
212039	2005 CZ_{52}	—	February 3, 2005	Socorro	LINEAR	·	1.7 km	MPC · JPL
212040	2005 CH_{53}	—	February 3, 2005	Socorro	LINEAR	NYS	2.0 km	MPC · JPL
212041	2005 CZ_{56}	—	February 2, 2005	Socorro	LINEAR	NYS ·	1.4 km	MPC · JPL
212042	2005 CJ_{58}	—	February 2, 2005	Catalina	CSS	·	2.0 km	MPC · JPL
212043	2005 CW_{63}	—	February 9, 2005	Anderson Mesa	LONEOS	·	1.7 km	MPC · JPL
212044	2005 CC_{65}	—	February 9, 2005	Mount Lemmon	Mount Lemmon Survey	·	1.7 km	MPC · JPL
212045	2005 CL_{65}	—	February 9, 2005	Kitt Peak	Spacewatch	NYS	1.6 km	MPC · JPL
212046	2005 CP_{67}	—	February 1, 2005	Palomar	NEAT	·	1.8 km	MPC · JPL
212047	2005 CT_{75}	—	February 2, 2005	Socorro	LINEAR	·	2.2 km	MPC · JPL
212048	2005 CE_{76}	—	February 2, 2005	Kitt Peak	Spacewatch	MAS	1.1 km	MPC · JPL
212049	2005 CD_{79}	—	February 1, 2005	Palomar	NEAT	·	1.7 km	MPC · JPL
212050	2005 EM_{8}	—	March 1, 2005	Kitt Peak	Spacewatch	·	1.9 km	MPC · JPL
212051	2005 EP_{11}	—	March 2, 2005	Catalina	CSS	·	1.5 km	MPC · JPL
212052	2005 EG_{20}	—	March 3, 2005	Catalina	CSS	·	1.7 km	MPC · JPL
212053	2005 EP_{20}	—	March 3, 2005	Catalina	CSS	V	1.3 km	MPC · JPL
212054	2005 EC_{21}	—	March 3, 2005	Catalina	CSS	·	2.6 km	MPC · JPL
212055	2005 ES_{22}	—	March 3, 2005	Catalina	CSS	·	1.4 km	MPC · JPL
212056	2005 EA_{23}	—	March 3, 2005	Catalina	CSS	MAS	900 m	MPC · JPL
212057	2005 EH_{25}	—	March 3, 2005	Catalina	CSS	·	2.0 km	MPC · JPL
212058	2005 EH_{30}	—	March 4, 2005	Mayhill	Lowe, A.	·	1.7 km	MPC · JPL
212059	2005 ER_{31}	—	March 3, 2005	Kitt Peak	Spacewatch	·	2.2 km	MPC · JPL
212060	2005 EC_{32}	—	March 3, 2005	Catalina	CSS	NYS	1.5 km	MPC · JPL
212061	2005 EJ_{32}	—	March 3, 2005	Catalina	CSS	·	1.9 km	MPC · JPL
212062	2005 EQ_{32}	—	March 3, 2005	Catalina	CSS	·	1.5 km	MPC · JPL
212063	2005 EB_{33}	—	March 4, 2005	Catalina	CSS	·	2.0 km	MPC · JPL
212064	2005 EZ_{35}	—	March 4, 2005	Catalina	CSS	·	1.9 km	MPC · JPL
212065	2005 ER_{36}	—	March 4, 2005	Socorro	LINEAR	·	1.9 km	MPC · JPL
212066	2005 EQ_{39}	—	March 1, 2005	Kitt Peak	Spacewatch	·	1.9 km	MPC · JPL
212067	2005 ER_{40}	—	March 1, 2005	Kitt Peak	Spacewatch	NYS	2.1 km	MPC · JPL
212068	2005 EW_{43}	—	March 3, 2005	Catalina	CSS	(5)	2.1 km	MPC · JPL
212069	2005 EV_{49}	—	March 3, 2005	Catalina	CSS	·	1.7 km	MPC · JPL
212070	2005 EP_{53}	—	March 4, 2005	Kitt Peak	Spacewatch	·	1.6 km	MPC · JPL
212071	2005 ED_{56}	—	March 4, 2005	Kitt Peak	Spacewatch	MAS	830 m	MPC · JPL
212072	2005 EL_{58}	—	March 4, 2005	Kitt Peak	Spacewatch	·	2.0 km	MPC · JPL
212073 Carlzimmer	2005 EF_{65}	Carlzimmer	March 4, 2005	Mount Lemmon	Mount Lemmon Survey	·	1.3 km	MPC · JPL
212074	2005 EG_{65}	—	March 4, 2005	Mount Lemmon	Mount Lemmon Survey	·	2.4 km	MPC · JPL
212075	2005 EK_{71}	—	March 2, 2005	Catalina	CSS	·	2.9 km	MPC · JPL
212076	2005 EQ_{75}	—	March 3, 2005	Kitt Peak	Spacewatch	·	1.5 km	MPC · JPL
212077	2005 EB_{76}	—	March 3, 2005	Kitt Peak	Spacewatch	·	1.5 km	MPC · JPL
212078	2005 EL_{79}	—	March 3, 2005	Catalina	CSS	EUN	1.9 km	MPC · JPL
212079	2005 EX_{82}	—	March 4, 2005	Kitt Peak	Spacewatch	·	1.2 km	MPC · JPL
212080	2005 EJ_{84}	—	March 4, 2005	Socorro	LINEAR	·	3.2 km	MPC · JPL
212081	2005 EM_{96}	—	March 3, 2005	Catalina	CSS	·	2.4 km	MPC · JPL
212082	2005 EA_{97}	—	March 3, 2005	Catalina	CSS	·	1.9 km	MPC · JPL
212083	2005 ES_{101}	—	March 3, 2005	Kitt Peak	Spacewatch	·	3.2 km	MPC · JPL
212084	2005 EE_{114}	—	March 4, 2005	Mount Lemmon	Mount Lemmon Survey	V	880 m	MPC · JPL
212085	2005 EZ_{114}	—	March 4, 2005	Kitt Peak	Spacewatch	·	1.5 km	MPC · JPL
212086	2005 ED_{115}	—	March 4, 2005	Mount Lemmon	Mount Lemmon Survey	·	1.6 km	MPC · JPL
212087	2005 EO_{119}	—	March 7, 2005	Socorro	LINEAR	HNS	1.7 km	MPC · JPL
212088	2005 EY_{121}	—	March 8, 2005	Socorro	LINEAR	·	2.8 km	MPC · JPL
212089	2005 EA_{124}	—	March 8, 2005	Anderson Mesa	LONEOS	·	1.5 km	MPC · JPL
212090	2005 EK_{124}	—	March 8, 2005	Anderson Mesa	LONEOS	·	2.1 km	MPC · JPL
212091	2005 EP_{125}	—	March 8, 2005	Mount Lemmon	Mount Lemmon Survey	·	1.6 km	MPC · JPL
212092	2005 EQ_{126}	—	March 8, 2005	Mount Lemmon	Mount Lemmon Survey	·	1 km	MPC · JPL
212093	2005 EM_{129}	—	March 9, 2005	Mount Lemmon	Mount Lemmon Survey	·	2.0 km	MPC · JPL
212094	2005 ER_{136}	—	March 9, 2005	Socorro	LINEAR	·	1.6 km	MPC · JPL
212095	2005 EY_{137}	—	March 9, 2005	Mount Lemmon	Mount Lemmon Survey	·	1.6 km	MPC · JPL
212096	2005 EH_{138}	—	March 9, 2005	Socorro	LINEAR	·	2.8 km	MPC · JPL
212097	2005 EY_{138}	—	March 9, 2005	Mount Lemmon	Mount Lemmon Survey	AGN	1.4 km	MPC · JPL
212098	2005 EL_{139}	—	March 9, 2005	Mount Lemmon	Mount Lemmon Survey	·	2.4 km	MPC · JPL
212099	2005 EX_{139}	—	March 9, 2005	Kitt Peak	Spacewatch	·	2.3 km	MPC · JPL
212100	2005 EX_{151}	—	March 10, 2005	Kitt Peak	Spacewatch	·	2.0 km	MPC · JPL

== 212101–212200 ==
back to top

Designation			Discovery			Properties		Ref
Permanent	Provisional	Named after	Date	Site	Discoverer(s)	Category	Diam.	Ref
212101	2005 ET_{153}	—	March 9, 2005	Catalina	CSS	HNS	1.7 km	MPC · JPL
212102	2005 EH_{154}	—	March 8, 2005	Mount Lemmon	Mount Lemmon Survey	·	3.5 km	MPC · JPL
212103	2005 EP_{154}	—	March 8, 2005	Mount Lemmon	Mount Lemmon Survey	MAR	1.7 km	MPC · JPL
212104	2005 EH_{156}	—	March 9, 2005	Catalina	CSS	·	3.0 km	MPC · JPL
212105	2005 EV_{159}	—	March 9, 2005	Mount Lemmon	Mount Lemmon Survey	·	1.5 km	MPC · JPL
212106	2005 EE_{161}	—	March 9, 2005	Mount Lemmon	Mount Lemmon Survey	(5)	1.2 km	MPC · JPL
212107	2005 ET_{161}	—	March 9, 2005	Mount Lemmon	Mount Lemmon Survey	·	2.4 km	MPC · JPL
212108	2005 EV_{169}	—	March 12, 2005	Socorro	LINEAR	·	3.3 km	MPC · JPL
212109	2005 EY_{170}	—	March 7, 2005	Socorro	LINEAR	(194)	4.0 km	MPC · JPL
212110	2005 EM_{173}	—	March 8, 2005	Anderson Mesa	LONEOS	·	2.4 km	MPC · JPL
212111	2005 EE_{174}	—	March 8, 2005	Kitt Peak	Spacewatch	·	1.8 km	MPC · JPL
212112	2005 ES_{176}	—	March 8, 2005	Socorro	LINEAR	·	1.9 km	MPC · JPL
212113	2005 EN_{177}	—	March 8, 2005	Mount Lemmon	Mount Lemmon Survey	·	2.8 km	MPC · JPL
212114	2005 EW_{179}	—	March 9, 2005	Kitt Peak	Spacewatch	·	1.2 km	MPC · JPL
212115	2005 EP_{184}	—	March 9, 2005	Kitt Peak	Spacewatch	·	2.9 km	MPC · JPL
212116	2005 ER_{184}	—	March 9, 2005	Kitt Peak	Spacewatch	·	2.3 km	MPC · JPL
212117	2005 EQ_{189}	—	March 11, 2005	Kitt Peak	Spacewatch	·	1.8 km	MPC · JPL
212118	2005 EG_{190}	—	March 11, 2005	Mount Lemmon	Mount Lemmon Survey	NYS	1.9 km	MPC · JPL
212119	2005 EC_{191}	—	March 11, 2005	Mount Lemmon	Mount Lemmon Survey	·	1.9 km	MPC · JPL
212120	2005 EG_{193}	—	March 11, 2005	Mount Lemmon	Mount Lemmon Survey	·	1.4 km	MPC · JPL
212121 Marthegautier	2005 EP_{195}	Marthegautier	March 11, 2005	Mount Lemmon	Mount Lemmon Survey	·	1.3 km	MPC · JPL
212122	2005 EK_{197}	—	March 11, 2005	Socorro	LINEAR	·	2.9 km	MPC · JPL
212123	2005 EB_{198}	—	March 11, 2005	Mount Lemmon	Mount Lemmon Survey	·	1.2 km	MPC · JPL
212124	2005 EW_{209}	—	March 4, 2005	Kitt Peak	Spacewatch	·	1.6 km	MPC · JPL
212125	2005 ED_{211}	—	March 4, 2005	Catalina	CSS	·	2.1 km	MPC · JPL
212126	2005 EJ_{217}	—	March 9, 2005	Anderson Mesa	LONEOS	·	1.5 km	MPC · JPL
212127	2005 EF_{218}	—	March 9, 2005	Mount Lemmon	Mount Lemmon Survey	·	2.1 km	MPC · JPL
212128	2005 EL_{218}	—	March 10, 2005	Catalina	CSS	·	1.9 km	MPC · JPL
212129	2005 ED_{219}	—	March 10, 2005	Mount Lemmon	Mount Lemmon Survey	NYS	1.7 km	MPC · JPL
212130	2005 ET_{222}	—	March 8, 2005	Socorro	LINEAR	·	2.0 km	MPC · JPL
212131	2005 EP_{225}	—	March 9, 2005	Catalina	CSS	·	1.8 km	MPC · JPL
212132	2005 EV_{230}	—	March 10, 2005	Mount Lemmon	Mount Lemmon Survey	·	1.9 km	MPC · JPL
212133	2005 EY_{230}	—	March 10, 2005	Catalina	CSS	·	3.5 km	MPC · JPL
212134	2005 EN_{237}	—	March 11, 2005	Kitt Peak	Spacewatch	·	1.1 km	MPC · JPL
212135	2005 ED_{241}	—	March 11, 2005	Catalina	CSS	·	1.8 km	MPC · JPL
212136	2005 EQ_{241}	—	March 11, 2005	Catalina	CSS	V	1.2 km	MPC · JPL
212137	2005 EF_{251}	—	March 10, 2005	Catalina	CSS	·	1.4 km	MPC · JPL
212138	2005 EJ_{251}	—	March 10, 2005	Anderson Mesa	LONEOS	V	1.1 km	MPC · JPL
212139	2005 EF_{253}	—	March 10, 2005	Catalina	CSS	·	4.0 km	MPC · JPL
212140	2005 EM_{260}	—	March 11, 2005	Kitt Peak	Spacewatch	·	2.4 km	MPC · JPL
212141	2005 ER_{276}	—	March 8, 2005	Mount Lemmon	Mount Lemmon Survey	·	1.3 km	MPC · JPL
212142	2005 EN_{277}	—	March 9, 2005	Catalina	CSS	·	3.0 km	MPC · JPL
212143	2005 EM_{278}	—	March 9, 2005	Mount Lemmon	Mount Lemmon Survey	·	1.7 km	MPC · JPL
212144	2005 EE_{279}	—	March 9, 2005	Mount Lemmon	Mount Lemmon Survey	·	1.4 km	MPC · JPL
212145	2005 EM_{280}	—	March 10, 2005	Catalina	CSS	·	1.6 km	MPC · JPL
212146	2005 ES_{280}	—	March 10, 2005	Anderson Mesa	LONEOS	PHO	2.9 km	MPC · JPL
212147	2005 EX_{280}	—	March 10, 2005	Anderson Mesa	LONEOS	·	3.5 km	MPC · JPL
212148	2005 EN_{288}	—	March 8, 2005	Mount Lemmon	Mount Lemmon Survey	(5)	1.6 km	MPC · JPL
212149	2005 EB_{293}	—	March 10, 2005	Catalina	CSS	·	2.4 km	MPC · JPL
212150	2005 EP_{310}	—	March 10, 2005	Mount Lemmon	Mount Lemmon Survey	·	1.9 km	MPC · JPL
212151	2005 EP_{312}	—	March 10, 2005	Kitt Peak	M. W. Buie	V	850 m	MPC · JPL
212152	2005 EA_{314}	—	March 10, 2005	Kitt Peak	M. W. Buie	·	1.7 km	MPC · JPL
212153	2005 EV_{317}	—	March 12, 2005	Kitt Peak	M. W. Buie	·	1.7 km	MPC · JPL
212154	2005 EK_{325}	—	March 8, 2005	Mount Lemmon	Mount Lemmon Survey	·	1.7 km	MPC · JPL
212155	2005 FY_{3}	—	March 16, 2005	Catalina	CSS	·	2.3 km	MPC · JPL
212156	2005 FB_{8}	—	March 30, 2005	Catalina	CSS	·	2.8 km	MPC · JPL
212157	2005 GF_{5}	—	April 1, 2005	Kitt Peak	Spacewatch	·	1.7 km	MPC · JPL
212158	2005 GL_{5}	—	April 1, 2005	Kitt Peak	Spacewatch	·	1.5 km	MPC · JPL
212159	2005 GV_{6}	—	April 1, 2005	Kitt Peak	Spacewatch	·	1.9 km	MPC · JPL
212160	2005 GF_{12}	—	April 1, 2005	Anderson Mesa	LONEOS	(5)	1.6 km	MPC · JPL
212161	2005 GW_{12}	—	April 1, 2005	Anderson Mesa	LONEOS	·	4.8 km	MPC · JPL
212162	2005 GK_{13}	—	April 1, 2005	Anderson Mesa	LONEOS	·	3.4 km	MPC · JPL
212163	2005 GL_{13}	—	April 1, 2005	Anderson Mesa	LONEOS	·	2.2 km	MPC · JPL
212164	2005 GO_{13}	—	April 1, 2005	Anderson Mesa	LONEOS	EUN	1.8 km	MPC · JPL
212165	2005 GH_{27}	—	April 3, 2005	Palomar	NEAT	·	1.5 km	MPC · JPL
212166	2005 GY_{27}	—	April 3, 2005	Palomar	NEAT	·	2.7 km	MPC · JPL
212167	2005 GR_{41}	—	April 5, 2005	Mount Lemmon	Mount Lemmon Survey	·	1.4 km	MPC · JPL
212168	2005 GO_{48}	—	April 5, 2005	Mount Lemmon	Mount Lemmon Survey	NEM	2.6 km	MPC · JPL
212169	2005 GL_{50}	—	April 5, 2005	Kitt Peak	Spacewatch	·	2.7 km	MPC · JPL
212170	2005 GR_{50}	—	April 7, 2005	Mayhill	Lowe, A.	·	3.2 km	MPC · JPL
212171	2005 GT_{50}	—	April 1, 2005	Kitt Peak	Spacewatch	·	2.4 km	MPC · JPL
212172	2005 GQ_{52}	—	April 2, 2005	Mount Lemmon	Mount Lemmon Survey	·	3.8 km	MPC · JPL
212173	2005 GQ_{53}	—	April 4, 2005	Socorro	LINEAR	·	2.0 km	MPC · JPL
212174	2005 GD_{54}	—	April 5, 2005	Anderson Mesa	LONEOS	·	2.0 km	MPC · JPL
212175	2005 GB_{60}	—	April 4, 2005	Catalina	CSS	BAR	2.0 km	MPC · JPL
212176 Fabriziospaziani	2005 GV_{60}	Fabriziospaziani	April 8, 2005	Campo Catino	F. Mallia, M. Di Sora	·	2.5 km	MPC · JPL
212177	2005 GT_{74}	—	April 5, 2005	Palomar	NEAT	(10369)	5.1 km	MPC · JPL
212178	2005 GD_{76}	—	April 5, 2005	Catalina	CSS	·	2.8 km	MPC · JPL
212179	2005 GE_{76}	—	April 5, 2005	Catalina	CSS	·	2.4 km	MPC · JPL
212180	2005 GJ_{76}	—	April 5, 2005	Catalina	CSS	·	2.3 km	MPC · JPL
212181	2005 GH_{79}	—	April 6, 2005	Catalina	CSS	·	3.1 km	MPC · JPL
212182	2005 GV_{79}	—	April 6, 2005	Mount Lemmon	Mount Lemmon Survey	·	2.8 km	MPC · JPL
212183	2005 GX_{80}	—	April 7, 2005	Kitt Peak	Spacewatch	·	2.3 km	MPC · JPL
212184	2005 GX_{84}	—	April 4, 2005	Kitt Peak	Spacewatch	·	1.6 km	MPC · JPL
212185	2005 GL_{86}	—	April 4, 2005	Socorro	LINEAR	(194)	2.4 km	MPC · JPL
212186	2005 GL_{92}	—	April 6, 2005	Kitt Peak	Spacewatch	RAF	2.2 km	MPC · JPL
212187	2005 GT_{94}	—	April 6, 2005	Kitt Peak	Spacewatch	·	1.6 km	MPC · JPL
212188	2005 GX_{94}	—	April 6, 2005	Kitt Peak	Spacewatch	·	2.1 km	MPC · JPL
212189	2005 GY_{97}	—	April 7, 2005	Mount Lemmon	Mount Lemmon Survey	·	2.8 km	MPC · JPL
212190	2005 GT_{100}	—	April 9, 2005	Kitt Peak	Spacewatch	·	1.9 km	MPC · JPL
212191	2005 GL_{101}	—	April 9, 2005	Kitt Peak	Spacewatch	AST	3.3 km	MPC · JPL
212192	2005 GL_{102}	—	April 9, 2005	Kitt Peak	Spacewatch	·	2.2 km	MPC · JPL
212193	2005 GF_{103}	—	April 9, 2005	Socorro	LINEAR	·	3.1 km	MPC · JPL
212194	2005 GK_{105}	—	April 10, 2005	Kitt Peak	Spacewatch	·	2.3 km	MPC · JPL
212195	2005 GV_{105}	—	April 10, 2005	Kitt Peak	Spacewatch	·	2.1 km	MPC · JPL
212196	2005 GR_{117}	—	April 11, 2005	Mount Lemmon	Mount Lemmon Survey	PAD	2.3 km	MPC · JPL
212197	2005 GX_{124}	—	April 10, 2005	Mount Lemmon	Mount Lemmon Survey	·	2.0 km	MPC · JPL
212198	2005 GA_{128}	—	April 9, 2005	Socorro	LINEAR	·	2.0 km	MPC · JPL
212199	2005 GW_{129}	—	April 7, 2005	Kitt Peak	Spacewatch	·	2.5 km	MPC · JPL
212200	2005 GQ_{132}	—	April 10, 2005	Kitt Peak	Spacewatch	·	1.1 km	MPC · JPL

== 212201–212300 ==
back to top

Designation			Discovery			Properties		Ref
Permanent	Provisional	Named after	Date	Site	Discoverer(s)	Category	Diam.	Ref
212201	2005 GR_{134}	—	April 10, 2005	Mount Lemmon	Mount Lemmon Survey	(5)	1.5 km	MPC · JPL
212202	2005 GX_{137}	—	April 11, 2005	Mount Lemmon	Mount Lemmon Survey	MRX	1.6 km	MPC · JPL
212203	2005 GU_{145}	—	April 11, 2005	Kitt Peak	Spacewatch	ADE	2.8 km	MPC · JPL
212204	2005 GZ_{151}	—	April 12, 2005	Kitt Peak	Spacewatch	·	2.7 km	MPC · JPL
212205	2005 GM_{152}	—	April 12, 2005	Mount Lemmon	Mount Lemmon Survey	·	3.0 km	MPC · JPL
212206	2005 GQ_{152}	—	April 12, 2005	Kitt Peak	Spacewatch	·	2.9 km	MPC · JPL
212207	2005 GD_{153}	—	April 13, 2005	Anderson Mesa	LONEOS	·	2.1 km	MPC · JPL
212208	2005 GN_{158}	—	April 12, 2005	Kitt Peak	Spacewatch	·	2.0 km	MPC · JPL
212209	2005 GJ_{162}	—	April 15, 2005	Catalina	CSS	·	2.5 km	MPC · JPL
212210	2005 GT_{162}	—	April 11, 2005	Mount Lemmon	Mount Lemmon Survey	·	2.6 km	MPC · JPL
212211	2005 GO_{167}	—	April 11, 2005	Mount Lemmon	Mount Lemmon Survey	·	1.8 km	MPC · JPL
212212	2005 GP_{167}	—	April 11, 2005	Mount Lemmon	Mount Lemmon Survey	·	2.1 km	MPC · JPL
212213	2005 GZ_{172}	—	April 14, 2005	Kitt Peak	Spacewatch	·	1.7 km	MPC · JPL
212214	2005 GN_{182}	—	April 1, 2005	Kitt Peak	Spacewatch	·	2.2 km	MPC · JPL
212215 Mallorykinczyk	2005 GH_{197}	Mallorykinczyk	April 10, 2005	Kitt Peak	M. W. Buie	·	1.4 km	MPC · JPL
212216	2005 GP_{214}	—	April 2, 2005	Kitt Peak	Spacewatch	·	1.8 km	MPC · JPL
212217	2005 GL_{215}	—	April 11, 2005	Siding Spring	SSS	·	2.1 km	MPC · JPL
212218	2005 GA_{224}	—	April 11, 2005	Mount Lemmon	Mount Lemmon Survey	AGN	1.6 km	MPC · JPL
212219	2005 HC	—	April 16, 2005	Vail-Jarnac	Jarnac	V	1.1 km	MPC · JPL
212220	2005 HV_{3}	—	April 28, 2005	Mayhill	Lowe, A.	·	2.1 km	MPC · JPL
212221	2005 JU_{9}	—	May 4, 2005	Mauna Kea	Veillet, C.	·	1.5 km	MPC · JPL
212222	2005 JF_{13}	—	May 4, 2005	Mauna Kea	Veillet, C.	·	1.6 km	MPC · JPL
212223	2005 JZ_{13}	—	May 1, 2005	Palomar	NEAT	·	2.2 km	MPC · JPL
212224	2005 JO_{14}	—	May 1, 2005	Palomar	NEAT	·	2.1 km	MPC · JPL
212225	2005 JR_{14}	—	May 1, 2005	Kitt Peak	Spacewatch	ADE	3.8 km	MPC · JPL
212226	2005 JL_{17}	—	May 4, 2005	Catalina	CSS	EUN	1.5 km	MPC · JPL
212227	2005 JJ_{19}	—	May 4, 2005	Kitt Peak	Spacewatch	·	2.2 km	MPC · JPL
212228	2005 JS_{19}	—	May 4, 2005	Catalina	CSS	·	2.6 km	MPC · JPL
212229	2005 JV_{21}	—	May 6, 2005	Catalina	CSS	·	2.5 km	MPC · JPL
212230	2005 JW_{25}	—	May 3, 2005	Kitt Peak	Spacewatch	NEM	2.6 km	MPC · JPL
212231	2005 JM_{27}	—	May 3, 2005	Socorro	LINEAR	·	4.3 km	MPC · JPL
212232	2005 JO_{30}	—	May 4, 2005	Kitt Peak	Spacewatch	·	1.4 km	MPC · JPL
212233	2005 JR_{30}	—	May 4, 2005	Kitt Peak	Spacewatch	·	2.2 km	MPC · JPL
212234	2005 JP_{31}	—	May 4, 2005	Anderson Mesa	LONEOS	526	4.2 km	MPC · JPL
212235	2005 JY_{32}	—	May 4, 2005	Kitt Peak	Spacewatch	(5)	1.7 km	MPC · JPL
212236	2005 JB_{33}	—	May 4, 2005	Catalina	CSS	MAR	1.4 km	MPC · JPL
212237	2005 JJ_{35}	—	May 4, 2005	Kitt Peak	Spacewatch	KON	2.9 km	MPC · JPL
212238	2005 JD_{36}	—	May 4, 2005	Kitt Peak	Spacewatch	·	3.1 km	MPC · JPL
212239	2005 JW_{38}	—	May 7, 2005	Kitt Peak	Spacewatch	·	1.9 km	MPC · JPL
212240	2005 JW_{42}	—	May 8, 2005	Kitt Peak	Spacewatch	·	3.5 km	MPC · JPL
212241	2005 JN_{44}	—	May 8, 2005	Mount Lemmon	Mount Lemmon Survey	·	1.5 km	MPC · JPL
212242	2005 JL_{49}	—	May 4, 2005	Kitt Peak	Spacewatch	·	1.5 km	MPC · JPL
212243	2005 JQ_{57}	—	May 7, 2005	Kitt Peak	Spacewatch	·	2.1 km	MPC · JPL
212244	2005 JU_{57}	—	May 7, 2005	Kitt Peak	Spacewatch	(12739)	1.7 km	MPC · JPL
212245	2005 JS_{65}	—	May 4, 2005	Palomar	NEAT	ADE	3.0 km	MPC · JPL
212246	2005 JV_{65}	—	May 4, 2005	Palomar	NEAT	·	2.2 km	MPC · JPL
212247	2005 JS_{67}	—	May 4, 2005	Palomar	NEAT	·	2.7 km	MPC · JPL
212248	2005 JG_{68}	—	May 6, 2005	Socorro	LINEAR	·	3.6 km	MPC · JPL
212249	2005 JQ_{68}	—	May 6, 2005	Catalina	CSS	EUN	1.9 km	MPC · JPL
212250	2005 JQ_{76}	—	May 9, 2005	Mount Lemmon	Mount Lemmon Survey	·	2.3 km	MPC · JPL
212251	2005 JH_{83}	—	May 8, 2005	Kitt Peak	Spacewatch	·	1.5 km	MPC · JPL
212252	2005 JJ_{83}	—	May 8, 2005	Kitt Peak	Spacewatch	KOR	1.6 km	MPC · JPL
212253	2005 JQ_{88}	—	May 10, 2005	Mount Lemmon	Mount Lemmon Survey	·	2.8 km	MPC · JPL
212254	2005 JZ_{88}	—	May 11, 2005	Kitt Peak	Spacewatch	·	2.1 km	MPC · JPL
212255	2005 JX_{91}	—	May 11, 2005	Palomar	NEAT	·	3.5 km	MPC · JPL
212256	2005 JH_{94}	—	May 7, 2005	Kitt Peak	Spacewatch	·	2.5 km	MPC · JPL
212257	2005 JS_{109}	—	May 12, 2005	Palomar	NEAT	·	6.3 km	MPC · JPL
212258	2005 JY_{109}	—	May 8, 2005	Kitt Peak	Spacewatch	·	3.8 km	MPC · JPL
212259	2005 JC_{111}	—	May 8, 2005	Kitt Peak	Spacewatch	·	2.7 km	MPC · JPL
212260	2005 JG_{111}	—	May 8, 2005	Socorro	LINEAR	ADE	3.6 km	MPC · JPL
212261	2005 JN_{113}	—	May 10, 2005	Kitt Peak	Spacewatch	·	790 m	MPC · JPL
212262	2005 JL_{115}	—	May 10, 2005	Kitt Peak	Spacewatch	·	2.6 km	MPC · JPL
212263	2005 JM_{117}	—	May 10, 2005	Kitt Peak	Spacewatch	·	3.0 km	MPC · JPL
212264	2005 JJ_{122}	—	May 11, 2005	Kitt Peak	Spacewatch	ADE	4.1 km	MPC · JPL
212265	2005 JA_{126}	—	May 12, 2005	Mount Lemmon	Mount Lemmon Survey	·	1.7 km	MPC · JPL
212266	2005 JF_{128}	—	May 12, 2005	Socorro	LINEAR	(5)	2.5 km	MPC · JPL
212267	2005 JT_{131}	—	May 13, 2005	Kitt Peak	Spacewatch	RAF	1.8 km	MPC · JPL
212268	2005 JH_{132}	—	May 13, 2005	Siding Spring	SSS	EUN ·	3.0 km	MPC · JPL
212269	2005 JQ_{136}	—	May 12, 2005	Kitt Peak	Spacewatch	JUN	1.2 km	MPC · JPL
212270	2005 JU_{136}	—	May 12, 2005	Kitt Peak	Spacewatch	·	2.8 km	MPC · JPL
212271	2005 JO_{140}	—	May 14, 2005	Socorro	LINEAR	·	2.2 km	MPC · JPL
212272	2005 JV_{143}	—	May 15, 2005	Mount Lemmon	Mount Lemmon Survey	·	1.7 km	MPC · JPL
212273	2005 JR_{147}	—	May 13, 2005	Catalina	CSS	EUN	2.2 km	MPC · JPL
212274	2005 JK_{148}	—	May 15, 2005	Palomar	NEAT	·	2.8 km	MPC · JPL
212275	2005 JY_{157}	—	May 4, 2005	Kitt Peak	Spacewatch	·	2.9 km	MPC · JPL
212276	2005 KO_{1}	—	May 16, 2005	Mount Lemmon	Mount Lemmon Survey	·	2.3 km	MPC · JPL
212277	2005 KN_{5}	—	May 16, 2005	Kitt Peak	Spacewatch	·	1.8 km	MPC · JPL
212278	2005 KV_{8}	—	May 21, 2005	Mount Lemmon	Mount Lemmon Survey	·	1.5 km	MPC · JPL
212279	2005 KF_{11}	—	May 30, 2005	Catalina	CSS	·	5.1 km	MPC · JPL
212280	2005 LK_{1}	—	June 1, 2005	Mount Lemmon	Mount Lemmon Survey	·	3.2 km	MPC · JPL
212281	2005 LQ_{6}	—	June 2, 2005	Socorro	LINEAR	GAL	2.4 km	MPC · JPL
212282	2005 LX_{8}	—	June 1, 2005	Mount Lemmon	Mount Lemmon Survey	·	2.8 km	MPC · JPL
212283	2005 LC_{21}	—	June 5, 2005	Socorro	LINEAR	·	3.0 km	MPC · JPL
212284	2005 LX_{22}	—	June 8, 2005	Kitt Peak	Spacewatch	·	2.9 km	MPC · JPL
212285	2005 LW_{28}	—	June 10, 2005	Kitt Peak	Spacewatch	·	2.6 km	MPC · JPL
212286	2005 LX_{32}	—	June 10, 2005	Kitt Peak	Spacewatch	·	2.4 km	MPC · JPL
212287	2005 LG_{38}	—	June 11, 2005	Kitt Peak	Spacewatch	·	2.6 km	MPC · JPL
212288	2005 LE_{45}	—	June 13, 2005	Kitt Peak	Spacewatch	ADE	3.8 km	MPC · JPL
212289	2005 MF_{3}	—	June 23, 2005	Palomar	NEAT	·	1.7 km	MPC · JPL
212290	2005 MJ_{3}	—	June 24, 2005	Palomar	NEAT	PAD	3.7 km	MPC · JPL
212291	2005 MC_{11}	—	June 27, 2005	Kitt Peak	Spacewatch	·	2.7 km	MPC · JPL
212292	2005 MZ_{14}	—	June 29, 2005	Palomar	NEAT	·	2.6 km	MPC · JPL
212293	2005 MG_{28}	—	June 29, 2005	Kitt Peak	Spacewatch	EOS ·	5.3 km	MPC · JPL
212294	2005 MP_{36}	—	June 30, 2005	Kitt Peak	Spacewatch	·	3.4 km	MPC · JPL
212295	2005 MT_{54}	—	June 27, 2005	Kitt Peak	Spacewatch	·	7.0 km	MPC · JPL
212296	2005 NH_{5}	—	July 3, 2005	Mount Lemmon	Mount Lemmon Survey	·	2.9 km	MPC · JPL
212297	2005 NV_{22}	—	July 3, 2005	Kitt Peak	Spacewatch	·	2.7 km	MPC · JPL
212298	2005 NN_{30}	—	July 4, 2005	Kitt Peak	Spacewatch	·	3.0 km	MPC · JPL
212299	2005 NP_{35}	—	July 5, 2005	Kitt Peak	Spacewatch	·	3.0 km	MPC · JPL
212300	2005 NB_{41}	—	July 4, 2005	Kitt Peak	Spacewatch	·	2.6 km	MPC · JPL

== 212301–212400 ==
back to top

Designation			Discovery			Properties		Ref
Permanent	Provisional	Named after	Date	Site	Discoverer(s)	Category	Diam.	Ref
212301	2005 NO_{52}	—	July 10, 2005	Kitt Peak	Spacewatch	HYG	3.9 km	MPC · JPL
212302	2005 NX_{57}	—	July 6, 2005	Kitt Peak	Spacewatch	VER	5.2 km	MPC · JPL
212303	2005 NZ_{71}	—	July 5, 2005	Palomar	NEAT	·	3.0 km	MPC · JPL
212304	2005 NR_{72}	—	July 7, 2005	Kitt Peak	Spacewatch	KOR	1.9 km	MPC · JPL
212305	2005 NT_{78}	—	July 12, 2005	Catalina	CSS	·	1.9 km	MPC · JPL
212306	2005 OT_{4}	—	July 28, 2005	Palomar	NEAT	·	1.3 km	MPC · JPL
212307	2005 OG_{6}	—	July 28, 2005	Palomar	NEAT	·	4.1 km	MPC · JPL
212308	2005 OD_{7}	—	July 28, 2005	Palomar	NEAT	VER	3.6 km	MPC · JPL
212309	2005 OS_{11}	—	July 29, 2005	Palomar	NEAT	·	5.3 km	MPC · JPL
212310	2005 QX_{6}	—	August 24, 2005	Palomar	NEAT	·	3.6 km	MPC · JPL
212311	2005 QM_{20}	—	August 26, 2005	Anderson Mesa	LONEOS	·	4.0 km	MPC · JPL
212312	2005 QY_{26}	—	August 27, 2005	Kitt Peak	Spacewatch	TIR	3.6 km	MPC · JPL
212313	2005 QZ_{34}	—	August 25, 2005	Palomar	NEAT	·	3.1 km	MPC · JPL
212314	2005 QU_{42}	—	August 26, 2005	Anderson Mesa	LONEOS	HYG	5.2 km	MPC · JPL
212315	2005 QZ_{55}	—	August 28, 2005	Kitt Peak	Spacewatch	·	3.7 km	MPC · JPL
212316	2005 QP_{60}	—	August 26, 2005	Anderson Mesa	LONEOS	LIX	5.1 km	MPC · JPL
212317	2005 QA_{62}	—	August 26, 2005	Palomar	NEAT	·	2.3 km	MPC · JPL
212318	2005 QV_{70}	—	August 29, 2005	Socorro	LINEAR	·	3.4 km	MPC · JPL
212319	2005 QZ_{71}	—	August 29, 2005	Anderson Mesa	LONEOS	·	4.3 km	MPC · JPL
212320	2005 QG_{108}	—	August 27, 2005	Palomar	NEAT	·	3.5 km	MPC · JPL
212321	2005 QQ_{126}	—	August 28, 2005	Kitt Peak	Spacewatch	·	2.1 km	MPC · JPL
212322	2005 QM_{146}	—	August 28, 2005	Siding Spring	SSS	·	4.4 km	MPC · JPL
212323	2005 QG_{157}	—	August 30, 2005	Palomar	NEAT	SYL · CYB	6.6 km	MPC · JPL
212324	2005 RH_{16}	—	September 1, 2005	Kitt Peak	Spacewatch	·	3.5 km	MPC · JPL
212325	2005 SB_{22}	—	September 23, 2005	Kitt Peak	Spacewatch	HYG	3.6 km	MPC · JPL
212326	2005 SU_{26}	—	September 23, 2005	Kitt Peak	Spacewatch	THM	3.5 km	MPC · JPL
212327	2005 SX_{54}	—	September 25, 2005	Kitt Peak	Spacewatch	(3460)	3.5 km	MPC · JPL
212328	2005 SD_{59}	—	September 26, 2005	Kitt Peak	Spacewatch	TIR	3.3 km	MPC · JPL
212329	2005 SR_{72}	—	September 23, 2005	Catalina	CSS	·	3.6 km	MPC · JPL
212330	2005 SM_{90}	—	September 24, 2005	Kitt Peak	Spacewatch	·	2.5 km	MPC · JPL
212331	2005 SK_{122}	—	September 29, 2005	Kitt Peak	Spacewatch	·	6.4 km	MPC · JPL
212332	2005 SC_{152}	—	September 25, 2005	Kitt Peak	Spacewatch	·	1.8 km	MPC · JPL
212333	2005 SF_{191}	—	September 29, 2005	Palomar	NEAT	·	5.8 km	MPC · JPL
212334	2005 SL_{204}	—	September 30, 2005	Mount Lemmon	Mount Lemmon Survey	3:2	6.3 km	MPC · JPL
212335	2005 SB_{212}	—	September 30, 2005	Mount Lemmon	Mount Lemmon Survey	·	2.2 km	MPC · JPL
212336	2005 SZ_{227}	—	September 30, 2005	Kitt Peak	Spacewatch	KOR	1.3 km	MPC · JPL
212337	2005 SD_{273}	—	September 30, 2005	Mount Lemmon	Mount Lemmon Survey	3:2	6.7 km	MPC · JPL
212338	2005 SH_{278}	—	September 23, 2005	Kitt Peak	Spacewatch	·	3.0 km	MPC · JPL
212339	2005 SL_{280}	—	September 25, 2005	Kitt Peak	Spacewatch	·	5.1 km	MPC · JPL
212340	2005 TN_{5}	—	October 1, 2005	Catalina	CSS	·	2.8 km	MPC · JPL
212341	2005 TX_{90}	—	October 6, 2005	Mount Lemmon	Mount Lemmon Survey	·	2.4 km	MPC · JPL
212342	2005 TY_{120}	—	October 7, 2005	Kitt Peak	Spacewatch	(12739)	2.1 km	MPC · JPL
212343	2005 TV_{135}	—	October 6, 2005	Kitt Peak	Spacewatch	·	5.8 km	MPC · JPL
212344	2005 UJ_{13}	—	October 22, 2005	Kitt Peak	Spacewatch	3:2	7.8 km	MPC · JPL
212345	2005 UW_{13}	—	October 22, 2005	Kitt Peak	Spacewatch	3:2 · SHU	7.1 km	MPC · JPL
212346	2005 UY_{68}	—	October 23, 2005	Palomar	NEAT	LIX	6.4 km	MPC · JPL
212347	2005 UX_{121}	—	October 24, 2005	Kitt Peak	Spacewatch	·	4.1 km	MPC · JPL
212348	2005 UK_{123}	—	October 24, 2005	Kitt Peak	Spacewatch	·	2.0 km	MPC · JPL
212349	2005 UM_{169}	—	October 24, 2005	Kitt Peak	Spacewatch	NYS	1.4 km	MPC · JPL
212350	2005 VU_{43}	—	November 3, 2005	Kitt Peak	Spacewatch	·	4.3 km	MPC · JPL
212351	2005 XE_{12}	—	December 1, 2005	Mount Lemmon	Mount Lemmon Survey	·	1.8 km	MPC · JPL
212352	2005 YC_{33}	—	December 22, 2005	Catalina	CSS	H	890 m	MPC · JPL
212353	2005 YG_{172}	—	December 22, 2005	Catalina	CSS	H	890 m	MPC · JPL
212354	2006 BQ_{101}	—	January 23, 2006	Mount Lemmon	Mount Lemmon Survey	·	1.8 km	MPC · JPL
212355	2006 DT_{37}	—	February 20, 2006	Mount Lemmon	Mount Lemmon Survey	·	1 km	MPC · JPL
212356	2006 DC_{87}	—	February 24, 2006	Kitt Peak	Spacewatch	·	1.1 km	MPC · JPL
212357	2006 DJ_{116}	—	February 27, 2006	Kitt Peak	Spacewatch	·	1.5 km	MPC · JPL
212358	2006 DP_{150}	—	February 25, 2006	Kitt Peak	Spacewatch	·	1.5 km	MPC · JPL
212359	2006 EV_{52}	—	March 2, 2006	Kitt Peak	Spacewatch	APO +1km	1.3 km	MPC · JPL
212360	2006 FD_{6}	—	March 23, 2006	Catalina	CSS	·	1.5 km	MPC · JPL
212361	2006 FQ_{24}	—	March 24, 2006	Kitt Peak	Spacewatch	NYS	1.1 km	MPC · JPL
212362	2006 FS_{41}	—	March 26, 2006	Mount Lemmon	Mount Lemmon Survey	·	980 m	MPC · JPL
212363	2006 GK_{12}	—	April 2, 2006	Kitt Peak	Spacewatch	·	850 m	MPC · JPL
212364	2006 GC_{23}	—	April 2, 2006	Kitt Peak	Spacewatch	·	1.7 km	MPC · JPL
212365	2006 GF_{25}	—	April 2, 2006	Kitt Peak	Spacewatch	·	660 m	MPC · JPL
212366	2006 GQ_{31}	—	April 2, 2006	Kitt Peak	Spacewatch	·	1.2 km	MPC · JPL
212367	2006 GC_{35}	—	April 7, 2006	Kitt Peak	Spacewatch	·	640 m	MPC · JPL
212368	2006 GK_{37}	—	April 2, 2006	Catalina	CSS	PHO	4.1 km	MPC · JPL
212369	2006 GD_{39}	—	April 8, 2006	Mount Lemmon	Mount Lemmon Survey	HIL · 3:2 · (3561)	9.4 km	MPC · JPL
212370	2006 GP_{40}	—	April 6, 2006	Catalina	CSS	·	1.0 km	MPC · JPL
212371	2006 HE_{6}	—	April 19, 2006	Catalina	CSS	·	1.0 km	MPC · JPL
212372	2006 HF_{15}	—	April 19, 2006	Palomar	NEAT	·	910 m	MPC · JPL
212373 Pietrocascella	2006 HL_{17}	Pietrocascella	April 22, 2006	Vallemare Borbona	V. S. Casulli	·	2.1 km	MPC · JPL
212374 Vellerat	2006 HG_{18}	Vellerat	April 21, 2006	Vicques	M. Ory	·	1.1 km	MPC · JPL
212375	2006 HE_{33}	—	April 19, 2006	Catalina	CSS	·	4.3 km	MPC · JPL
212376	2006 HR_{35}	—	April 19, 2006	Catalina	CSS	·	1.2 km	MPC · JPL
212377	2006 HO_{39}	—	April 21, 2006	Kitt Peak	Spacewatch	·	930 m	MPC · JPL
212378	2006 HW_{43}	—	April 24, 2006	Mount Lemmon	Mount Lemmon Survey	·	1.6 km	MPC · JPL
212379	2006 HD_{55}	—	April 21, 2006	Catalina	CSS	·	1.0 km	MPC · JPL
212380	2006 HQ_{55}	—	April 24, 2006	Socorro	LINEAR	·	1.2 km	MPC · JPL
212381	2006 HP_{59}	—	April 24, 2006	Anderson Mesa	LONEOS	·	910 m	MPC · JPL
212382	2006 HJ_{63}	—	April 24, 2006	Kitt Peak	Spacewatch	·	870 m	MPC · JPL
212383	2006 HQ_{77}	—	April 25, 2006	Palomar	NEAT	·	960 m	MPC · JPL
212384	2006 HK_{82}	—	April 26, 2006	Kitt Peak	Spacewatch	·	860 m	MPC · JPL
212385	2006 HL_{84}	—	April 26, 2006	Kitt Peak	Spacewatch	·	840 m	MPC · JPL
212386	2006 HP_{86}	—	April 27, 2006	Socorro	LINEAR	·	980 m	MPC · JPL
212387	2006 HM_{88}	—	April 30, 2006	Kitt Peak	Spacewatch	·	970 m	MPC · JPL
212388	2006 HP_{100}	—	April 30, 2006	Catalina	CSS	·	940 m	MPC · JPL
212389	2006 HU_{108}	—	April 30, 2006	Catalina	CSS	·	1.0 km	MPC · JPL
212390	2006 HD_{111}	—	April 21, 2006	Catalina	CSS	·	900 m	MPC · JPL
212391	2006 HG_{111}	—	April 26, 2006	Socorro	LINEAR	·	1.2 km	MPC · JPL
212392 Peterkollmann	2006 HE_{140}	Peterkollmann	April 26, 2006	Cerro Tololo	M. W. Buie	·	1.6 km	MPC · JPL
212393	2006 HE_{153}	—	April 26, 2006	Mount Lemmon	Mount Lemmon Survey	·	1.8 km	MPC · JPL
212394	2006 JD_{7}	—	May 1, 2006	Kitt Peak	Spacewatch	·	830 m	MPC · JPL
212395	2006 JL_{12}	—	May 1, 2006	Kitt Peak	Spacewatch	·	1.7 km	MPC · JPL
212396	2006 JN_{19}	—	May 2, 2006	Mount Lemmon	Mount Lemmon Survey	·	1.2 km	MPC · JPL
212397	2006 JZ_{23}	—	May 3, 2006	Mount Lemmon	Mount Lemmon Survey	·	2.1 km	MPC · JPL
212398	2006 JF_{27}	—	May 1, 2006	Kitt Peak	Spacewatch	·	720 m	MPC · JPL
212399	2006 JH_{38}	—	May 6, 2006	Mount Lemmon	Mount Lemmon Survey	·	770 m	MPC · JPL
212400	2006 JZ_{38}	—	May 6, 2006	Mount Lemmon	Mount Lemmon Survey	NYS	1.5 km	MPC · JPL

== 212401–212500 ==
back to top

Designation			Discovery			Properties		Ref
Permanent	Provisional	Named after	Date	Site	Discoverer(s)	Category	Diam.	Ref
212401	2006 JW_{42}	—	May 2, 2006	Mount Lemmon	Mount Lemmon Survey	·	1.2 km	MPC · JPL
212402	2006 JN_{48}	—	May 8, 2006	Kitt Peak	Spacewatch	·	870 m	MPC · JPL
212403 Marthakusterer	2006 JQ_{60}	Marthakusterer	May 1, 2006	Kitt Peak	M. W. Buie	·	1.5 km	MPC · JPL
212404	2006 KO_{1}	—	May 20, 2006	Reedy Creek	J. Broughton	·	2.1 km	MPC · JPL
212405	2006 KM_{8}	—	May 19, 2006	Mount Lemmon	Mount Lemmon Survey	·	1.2 km	MPC · JPL
212406	2006 KJ_{23}	—	May 23, 2006	Reedy Creek	J. Broughton	·	1.0 km	MPC · JPL
212407	2006 KE_{27}	—	May 20, 2006	Mount Lemmon	Mount Lemmon Survey	·	860 m	MPC · JPL
212408	2006 KV_{27}	—	May 20, 2006	Kitt Peak	Spacewatch	·	710 m	MPC · JPL
212409	2006 KZ_{36}	—	May 21, 2006	Kitt Peak	Spacewatch	·	670 m	MPC · JPL
212410	2006 KG_{39}	—	May 18, 2006	Palomar	NEAT	·	1.5 km	MPC · JPL
212411	2006 KO_{42}	—	May 20, 2006	Mount Lemmon	Mount Lemmon Survey	·	1.5 km	MPC · JPL
212412	2006 KN_{56}	—	May 22, 2006	Kitt Peak	Spacewatch	·	1.6 km	MPC · JPL
212413	2006 KW_{58}	—	May 22, 2006	Kitt Peak	Spacewatch	V	670 m	MPC · JPL
212414	2006 KB_{69}	—	May 20, 2006	Siding Spring	SSS	·	890 m	MPC · JPL
212415	2006 KP_{97}	—	May 26, 2006	Catalina	CSS	·	2.8 km	MPC · JPL
212416	2006 KV_{100}	—	May 24, 2006	Palomar	NEAT	·	990 m	MPC · JPL
212417	2006 KJ_{103}	—	May 28, 2006	Siding Spring	SSS	PHO	3.5 km	MPC · JPL
212418	2006 KD_{113}	—	May 18, 2006	Palomar	NEAT	·	1.0 km	MPC · JPL
212419	2006 KK_{113}	—	May 20, 2006	Catalina	CSS	·	970 m	MPC · JPL
212420	2006 KD_{116}	—	May 29, 2006	Kitt Peak	Spacewatch	·	1.3 km	MPC · JPL
212421	2006 KV_{120}	—	May 19, 2006	Catalina	CSS	·	1.0 km	MPC · JPL
212422	2006 LG_{7}	—	June 11, 2006	Palomar	NEAT	·	2.4 km	MPC · JPL
212423	2006 MT_{1}	—	June 18, 2006	Kitt Peak	Spacewatch	MAR	1.4 km	MPC · JPL
212424	2006 MA_{9}	—	June 19, 2006	Mount Lemmon	Mount Lemmon Survey	·	1.8 km	MPC · JPL
212425	2006 MQ_{13}	—	June 20, 2006	Hibiscus	S. F. Hönig	·	1.8 km	MPC · JPL
212426	2006 OB	—	July 16, 2006	Hibiscus	Teamo, N., S. F. Hönig	NYS	1.7 km	MPC · JPL
212427	2006 OL	—	July 17, 2006	Mayhill	Mayhill	·	960 m	MPC · JPL
212428	2006 OX_{1}	—	July 18, 2006	Reedy Creek	J. Broughton	MAS	1.1 km	MPC · JPL
212429	2006 OF_{4}	—	July 21, 2006	Mount Lemmon	Mount Lemmon Survey	·	1.8 km	MPC · JPL
212430	2006 OV_{7}	—	July 19, 2006	Palomar	NEAT	MAS	1.1 km	MPC · JPL
212431	2006 OO_{11}	—	July 20, 2006	Palomar	NEAT	NYS	1.6 km	MPC · JPL
212432	2006 OX_{12}	—	July 20, 2006	Palomar	NEAT	NYS	1.4 km	MPC · JPL
212433	2006 OP_{15}	—	July 26, 2006	Siding Spring	SSS	·	2.3 km	MPC · JPL
212434	2006 OA_{16}	—	July 29, 2006	Reedy Creek	J. Broughton	HNS	1.9 km	MPC · JPL
212435	2006 OJ_{16}	—	July 18, 2006	Mount Lemmon	Mount Lemmon Survey	·	1.8 km	MPC · JPL
212436	2006 OA_{20}	—	July 31, 2006	Siding Spring	SSS	·	2.3 km	MPC · JPL
212437	2006 PA_{13}	—	August 14, 2006	Siding Spring	SSS	·	830 m	MPC · JPL
212438	2006 PP_{13}	—	August 14, 2006	Siding Spring	SSS	·	1.9 km	MPC · JPL
212439	2006 PN_{15}	—	August 15, 2006	Palomar	NEAT	·	2.6 km	MPC · JPL
212440	2006 PH_{19}	—	August 13, 2006	Palomar	NEAT	NYS	1.4 km	MPC · JPL
212441	2006 PU_{19}	—	August 13, 2006	Palomar	NEAT	·	1.5 km	MPC · JPL
212442	2006 PQ_{23}	—	August 12, 2006	Palomar	NEAT	MAS	1.0 km	MPC · JPL
212443	2006 PA_{24}	—	August 12, 2006	Palomar	NEAT	·	2.0 km	MPC · JPL
212444	2006 PD_{24}	—	August 12, 2006	Palomar	NEAT	·	2.9 km	MPC · JPL
212445	2006 PQ_{34}	—	August 11, 2006	Palomar	NEAT	·	3.0 km	MPC · JPL
212446	2006 PL_{39}	—	August 14, 2006	Palomar	NEAT	·	3.9 km	MPC · JPL
212447	2006 PU_{39}	—	August 14, 2006	Palomar	NEAT	EOS	2.6 km	MPC · JPL
212448	2006 PT_{41}	—	August 14, 2006	Palomar	NEAT	EOS	2.2 km	MPC · JPL
212449	2006 PQ_{42}	—	August 14, 2006	Siding Spring	SSS	MRX	1.5 km	MPC · JPL
212450	2006 QO	—	August 16, 2006	Reedy Creek	J. Broughton	·	1.2 km	MPC · JPL
212451	2006 QV_{15}	—	August 17, 2006	Palomar	NEAT	KOR	1.8 km	MPC · JPL
212452	2006 QJ_{18}	—	August 17, 2006	Palomar	NEAT	·	2.1 km	MPC · JPL
212453	2006 QL_{19}	—	August 17, 2006	Palomar	NEAT	·	1.4 km	MPC · JPL
212454	2006 QZ_{19}	—	August 18, 2006	Anderson Mesa	LONEOS	·	4.1 km	MPC · JPL
212455	2006 QA_{20}	—	August 18, 2006	Anderson Mesa	LONEOS	·	1.3 km	MPC · JPL
212456	2006 QK_{20}	—	August 18, 2006	Anderson Mesa	LONEOS	·	5.4 km	MPC · JPL
212457	2006 QO_{22}	—	August 19, 2006	Anderson Mesa	LONEOS	·	2.2 km	MPC · JPL
212458	2006 QF_{24}	—	August 17, 2006	Palomar	NEAT	·	6.4 km	MPC · JPL
212459	2006 QK_{26}	—	August 19, 2006	Kitt Peak	Spacewatch	·	3.7 km	MPC · JPL
212460	2006 QD_{28}	—	August 20, 2006	Kitt Peak	Spacewatch	·	3.3 km	MPC · JPL
212461	2006 QT_{29}	—	August 17, 2006	Palomar	NEAT	NYS	1.8 km	MPC · JPL
212462	2006 QH_{30}	—	August 20, 2006	Palomar	NEAT	·	1.7 km	MPC · JPL
212463	2006 QP_{32}	—	August 21, 2006	Palomar	NEAT	·	3.3 km	MPC · JPL
212464	2006 QK_{34}	—	August 19, 2006	Kitt Peak	Spacewatch	·	2.7 km	MPC · JPL
212465 Goroshky	2006 QD_{40}	Goroshky	August 23, 2006	Andrushivka	Andrushivka	·	2.9 km	MPC · JPL
212466	2006 QA_{41}	—	August 17, 2006	Palomar	NEAT	·	4.1 km	MPC · JPL
212467	2006 QC_{42}	—	August 17, 2006	Palomar	NEAT	KOR	2.1 km	MPC · JPL
212468	2006 QL_{43}	—	August 18, 2006	Kitt Peak	Spacewatch	EOS ·	4.8 km	MPC · JPL
212469	2006 QS_{44}	—	August 19, 2006	Anderson Mesa	LONEOS	·	2.8 km	MPC · JPL
212470	2006 QU_{44}	—	August 19, 2006	Anderson Mesa	LONEOS	NYS	1.7 km	MPC · JPL
212471	2006 QH_{47}	—	August 20, 2006	Palomar	NEAT	EOS	3.1 km	MPC · JPL
212472	2006 QQ_{47}	—	August 20, 2006	Palomar	NEAT	·	1.3 km	MPC · JPL
212473	2006 QR_{52}	—	August 23, 2006	Palomar	NEAT	·	2.8 km	MPC · JPL
212474	2006 QW_{53}	—	August 16, 2006	Siding Spring	SSS	·	2.3 km	MPC · JPL
212475	2006 QL_{62}	—	August 22, 2006	Palomar	NEAT	·	1.8 km	MPC · JPL
212476	2006 QR_{65}	—	August 27, 2006	Kitt Peak	Spacewatch	·	2.5 km	MPC · JPL
212477	2006 QK_{71}	—	August 21, 2006	Kitt Peak	Spacewatch	HYG	3.2 km	MPC · JPL
212478	2006 QK_{72}	—	August 21, 2006	Kitt Peak	Spacewatch	HOF	4.0 km	MPC · JPL
212479	2006 QU_{78}	—	August 23, 2006	Socorro	LINEAR	·	2.1 km	MPC · JPL
212480	2006 QB_{79}	—	August 23, 2006	Palomar	NEAT	KOR	2.0 km	MPC · JPL
212481	2006 QM_{81}	—	August 24, 2006	Palomar	NEAT	·	1.8 km	MPC · JPL
212482	2006 QQ_{81}	—	August 24, 2006	Palomar	NEAT	·	3.2 km	MPC · JPL
212483	2006 QF_{82}	—	August 25, 2006	Pises	Pises	·	2.3 km	MPC · JPL
212484	2006 QC_{93}	—	August 16, 2006	Palomar	NEAT	V	900 m	MPC · JPL
212485	2006 QS_{93}	—	August 16, 2006	Palomar	NEAT	·	1.2 km	MPC · JPL
212486	2006 QE_{100}	—	August 24, 2006	Socorro	LINEAR	EOS	3.0 km	MPC · JPL
212487	2006 QM_{100}	—	August 24, 2006	Palomar	NEAT	GEF	1.7 km	MPC · JPL
212488	2006 QG_{103}	—	August 27, 2006	Kitt Peak	Spacewatch	·	1.2 km	MPC · JPL
212489	2006 QL_{113}	—	August 24, 2006	Socorro	LINEAR	·	2.0 km	MPC · JPL
212490	2006 QL_{117}	—	August 27, 2006	Anderson Mesa	LONEOS	3:2 · SHU	6.6 km	MPC · JPL
212491	2006 QW_{117}	—	August 27, 2006	Anderson Mesa	LONEOS	·	2.7 km	MPC · JPL
212492	2006 QH_{122}	—	August 29, 2006	Catalina	CSS	·	1.9 km	MPC · JPL
212493	2006 QL_{139}	—	August 17, 2006	Palomar	NEAT	KOR	1.7 km	MPC · JPL
212494	2006 QO_{139}	—	August 17, 2006	Palomar	NEAT	·	2.6 km	MPC · JPL
212495	2006 QU_{141}	—	August 18, 2006	Palomar	NEAT	·	2.3 km	MPC · JPL
212496	2006 QX_{144}	—	August 29, 2006	Catalina	CSS	·	2.6 km	MPC · JPL
212497	2006 QV_{154}	—	August 18, 2006	Palomar	NEAT	·	3.1 km	MPC · JPL
212498	2006 QS_{165}	—	August 29, 2006	Catalina	CSS	·	3.0 km	MPC · JPL
212499	2006 QA_{168}	—	August 30, 2006	Anderson Mesa	LONEOS	AGN	1.6 km	MPC · JPL
212500 Robertojoppolo	2006 RT	Robertojoppolo	September 4, 2006	Vallemare Borbona	V. S. Casulli	·	3.1 km	MPC · JPL

== 212501–212600 ==
back to top

Designation			Discovery			Properties		Ref
Permanent	Provisional	Named after	Date	Site	Discoverer(s)	Category	Diam.	Ref
212501 Deniserichards	2006 RK_{6}	Deniserichards	September 14, 2006	Catalina	CSS	·	2.2 km	MPC · JPL
212502	2006 RQ_{6}	—	September 14, 2006	Catalina	CSS	·	3.1 km	MPC · JPL
212503	2006 RS_{7}	—	September 12, 2006	Catalina	CSS	·	2.5 km	MPC · JPL
212504	2006 RK_{8}	—	September 12, 2006	Catalina	CSS	AGN	1.7 km	MPC · JPL
212505	2006 RT_{16}	—	September 14, 2006	Catalina	CSS	·	2.2 km	MPC · JPL
212506	2006 RE_{17}	—	September 14, 2006	Catalina	CSS	·	2.4 km	MPC · JPL
212507	2006 RB_{18}	—	September 14, 2006	Palomar	NEAT	·	4.8 km	MPC · JPL
212508	2006 RZ_{18}	—	September 14, 2006	Palomar	NEAT	EUN	1.8 km	MPC · JPL
212509	2006 RA_{20}	—	September 15, 2006	Kitt Peak	Spacewatch	·	2.3 km	MPC · JPL
212510	2006 RL_{22}	—	September 15, 2006	7300	W. K. Y. Yeung	·	1.0 km	MPC · JPL
212511	2006 RC_{27}	—	September 14, 2006	Catalina	CSS	(5)	1.6 km	MPC · JPL
212512	2006 RF_{27}	—	September 14, 2006	Catalina	CSS	·	2.0 km	MPC · JPL
212513	2006 RB_{31}	—	September 15, 2006	Socorro	LINEAR	·	4.5 km	MPC · JPL
212514	2006 RC_{33}	—	September 15, 2006	Palomar	NEAT	·	2.3 km	MPC · JPL
212515	2006 RG_{34}	—	September 12, 2006	Catalina	CSS	WIT	1.6 km	MPC · JPL
212516	2006 RM_{34}	—	September 12, 2006	Catalina	CSS	·	4.5 km	MPC · JPL
212517	2006 RZ_{35}	—	September 14, 2006	Catalina	CSS	·	4.4 km	MPC · JPL
212518	2006 RK_{36}	—	September 15, 2006	Palomar	NEAT	·	3.0 km	MPC · JPL
212519	2006 RE_{40}	—	September 12, 2006	Catalina	CSS	·	4.3 km	MPC · JPL
212520	2006 RD_{43}	—	September 14, 2006	Kitt Peak	Spacewatch	KOR	1.9 km	MPC · JPL
212521	2006 RK_{43}	—	September 14, 2006	Kitt Peak	Spacewatch	GEF	1.9 km	MPC · JPL
212522	2006 RY_{46}	—	September 14, 2006	Kitt Peak	Spacewatch	·	4.0 km	MPC · JPL
212523	2006 RB_{55}	—	September 14, 2006	Kitt Peak	Spacewatch	AST	3.4 km	MPC · JPL
212524	2006 RO_{57}	—	September 15, 2006	Kitt Peak	Spacewatch	·	2.3 km	MPC · JPL
212525	2006 RM_{61}	—	September 12, 2006	Catalina	CSS	KOR	1.8 km	MPC · JPL
212526	2006 RZ_{67}	—	September 15, 2006	Kitt Peak	Spacewatch	EOS	2.8 km	MPC · JPL
212527	2006 RY_{71}	—	September 15, 2006	Kitt Peak	Spacewatch	·	2.1 km	MPC · JPL
212528	2006 RE_{74}	—	September 15, 2006	Kitt Peak	Spacewatch	KOR	2.1 km	MPC · JPL
212529	2006 RL_{74}	—	September 15, 2006	Kitt Peak	Spacewatch	·	2.9 km	MPC · JPL
212530	2006 RR_{74}	—	September 15, 2006	Kitt Peak	Spacewatch	THM	2.8 km	MPC · JPL
212531	2006 RD_{77}	—	September 15, 2006	Kitt Peak	Spacewatch	KOR	2.0 km	MPC · JPL
212532	2006 RH_{78}	—	September 15, 2006	Kitt Peak	Spacewatch	·	1.7 km	MPC · JPL
212533	2006 RB_{85}	—	September 15, 2006	Kitt Peak	Spacewatch	·	3.4 km	MPC · JPL
212534	2006 RK_{87}	—	September 15, 2006	Kitt Peak	Spacewatch	·	2.7 km	MPC · JPL
212535	2006 RY_{89}	—	September 15, 2006	Kitt Peak	Spacewatch	·	2.0 km	MPC · JPL
212536	2006 RY_{91}	—	September 15, 2006	Kitt Peak	Spacewatch	HYG	3.8 km	MPC · JPL
212537	2006 RM_{95}	—	September 15, 2006	Kitt Peak	Spacewatch	·	3.2 km	MPC · JPL
212538	2006 RS_{95}	—	September 15, 2006	Kitt Peak	Spacewatch	(16286)	2.4 km	MPC · JPL
212539	2006 RS_{97}	—	September 15, 2006	Kitt Peak	Spacewatch	·	3.0 km	MPC · JPL
212540	2006 RR_{99}	—	September 12, 2006	Catalina	CSS	·	2.4 km	MPC · JPL
212541	2006 RY_{104}	—	September 15, 2006	Kitt Peak	Spacewatch	DOR	4.2 km	MPC · JPL
212542	2006 SF_{4}	—	September 16, 2006	Catalina	CSS	·	2.9 km	MPC · JPL
212543	2006 SU_{4}	—	September 16, 2006	Catalina	CSS	·	4.4 km	MPC · JPL
212544	2006 SA_{8}	—	September 16, 2006	Catalina	CSS	·	3.6 km	MPC · JPL
212545	2006 SG_{11}	—	September 16, 2006	Socorro	LINEAR	RAF	1.1 km	MPC · JPL
212546	2006 SV_{19}	—	September 19, 2006	Catalina	CSS	AMO +1km · PHA	1.0 km	MPC · JPL
212547	2006 SD_{20}	—	September 18, 2006	Calvin-Rehoboth	Calvin College	·	3.6 km	MPC · JPL
212548	2006 SW_{23}	—	September 18, 2006	Anderson Mesa	LONEOS	·	2.0 km	MPC · JPL
212549	2006 SA_{24}	—	September 18, 2006	Catalina	CSS	·	4.6 km	MPC · JPL
212550	2006 SR_{25}	—	September 16, 2006	Anderson Mesa	LONEOS	·	4.4 km	MPC · JPL
212551	2006 SL_{30}	—	September 17, 2006	Kitt Peak	Spacewatch	·	2.4 km	MPC · JPL
212552	2006 SU_{36}	—	September 17, 2006	Kitt Peak	Spacewatch	·	5.4 km	MPC · JPL
212553	2006 SY_{37}	—	September 18, 2006	Kitt Peak	Spacewatch	·	1.9 km	MPC · JPL
212554	2006 SG_{43}	—	September 18, 2006	Kitt Peak	Spacewatch	·	2.7 km	MPC · JPL
212555	2006 SQ_{46}	—	September 19, 2006	Catalina	CSS	·	2.8 km	MPC · JPL
212556	2006 SV_{49}	—	September 19, 2006	La Sagra	OAM	·	2.5 km	MPC · JPL
212557	2006 SW_{49}	—	September 19, 2006	La Sagra	OAM	·	6.3 km	MPC · JPL
212558	2006 SM_{50}	—	September 16, 2006	Catalina	CSS	·	4.6 km	MPC · JPL
212559	2006 SE_{66}	—	September 19, 2006	Anderson Mesa	LONEOS	NAE	3.8 km	MPC · JPL
212560	2006 SF_{66}	—	September 19, 2006	Kitt Peak	Spacewatch	GEF	1.6 km	MPC · JPL
212561	2006 SP_{73}	—	September 19, 2006	Kitt Peak	Spacewatch	·	5.6 km	MPC · JPL
212562	2006 SY_{74}	—	September 19, 2006	Kitt Peak	Spacewatch	KOR	1.7 km	MPC · JPL
212563	2006 SM_{80}	—	September 18, 2006	Catalina	CSS	·	3.0 km	MPC · JPL
212564	2006 SJ_{81}	—	September 18, 2006	Kitt Peak	Spacewatch	·	1.9 km	MPC · JPL
212565	2006 SW_{83}	—	September 18, 2006	Kitt Peak	Spacewatch	·	2.7 km	MPC · JPL
212566	2006 ST_{84}	—	September 18, 2006	Kitt Peak	Spacewatch	·	2.5 km	MPC · JPL
212567	2006 SW_{85}	—	September 18, 2006	Kitt Peak	Spacewatch	EOS	2.1 km	MPC · JPL
212568	2006 SH_{91}	—	September 18, 2006	Kitt Peak	Spacewatch	·	3.4 km	MPC · JPL
212569	2006 SL_{92}	—	September 18, 2006	Kitt Peak	Spacewatch	·	4.2 km	MPC · JPL
212570	2006 SE_{94}	—	September 18, 2006	Kitt Peak	Spacewatch	·	2.3 km	MPC · JPL
212571	2006 SH_{97}	—	September 18, 2006	Kitt Peak	Spacewatch	NEM	2.9 km	MPC · JPL
212572	2006 SG_{99}	—	September 18, 2006	Kitt Peak	Spacewatch	·	2.0 km	MPC · JPL
212573	2006 SM_{106}	—	September 19, 2006	Kitt Peak	Spacewatch	·	1.9 km	MPC · JPL
212574	2006 SO_{111}	—	September 22, 2006	Anderson Mesa	LONEOS	EOS	3.6 km	MPC · JPL
212575	2006 SH_{115}	—	September 24, 2006	Kitt Peak	Spacewatch	·	3.2 km	MPC · JPL
212576	2006 SK_{115}	—	September 24, 2006	Kitt Peak	Spacewatch	·	5.6 km	MPC · JPL
212577	2006 SK_{116}	—	September 24, 2006	Kitt Peak	Spacewatch	·	2.4 km	MPC · JPL
212578	2006 SD_{123}	—	September 19, 2006	Catalina	CSS	·	2.9 km	MPC · JPL
212579	2006 SG_{124}	—	September 19, 2006	Catalina	CSS	·	4.3 km	MPC · JPL
212580	2006 SN_{125}	—	September 20, 2006	Catalina	CSS	·	4.9 km	MPC · JPL
212581	2006 ST_{133}	—	September 17, 2006	Catalina	CSS	·	2.5 km	MPC · JPL
212582	2006 SD_{134}	—	September 20, 2006	Kitt Peak	Spacewatch	·	3.8 km	MPC · JPL
212583	2006 SS_{139}	—	September 22, 2006	Socorro	LINEAR	(194)	4.1 km	MPC · JPL
212584	2006 SO_{149}	—	September 19, 2006	Kitt Peak	Spacewatch	·	2.0 km	MPC · JPL
212585	2006 SQ_{159}	—	September 23, 2006	Kitt Peak	Spacewatch	·	2.9 km	MPC · JPL
212586	2006 SD_{161}	—	September 23, 2006	Kitt Peak	Spacewatch	KOR	1.9 km	MPC · JPL
212587 Bartašiūtė	2006 SQ_{161}	Bartašiūtė	September 23, 2006	Moletai	K. Černis, Zdanavicius, J.	·	2.3 km	MPC · JPL
212588	2006 SK_{173}	—	September 25, 2006	Kitt Peak	Spacewatch	NYS ·	1.1 km	MPC · JPL
212589	2006 SQ_{173}	—	September 25, 2006	Socorro	LINEAR	·	4.1 km	MPC · JPL
212590	2006 SA_{177}	—	September 25, 2006	Kitt Peak	Spacewatch	·	2.6 km	MPC · JPL
212591	2006 SO_{192}	—	September 26, 2006	Mount Lemmon	Mount Lemmon Survey	·	2.4 km	MPC · JPL
212592	2006 SH_{194}	—	September 26, 2006	Kitt Peak	Spacewatch	EOS	2.3 km	MPC · JPL
212593	2006 SF_{206}	—	September 25, 2006	Mount Lemmon	Mount Lemmon Survey	·	2.6 km	MPC · JPL
212594	2006 SN_{208}	—	September 26, 2006	Socorro	LINEAR	EOS	3.2 km	MPC · JPL
212595	2006 SZ_{208}	—	September 26, 2006	Kitt Peak	Spacewatch	·	2.0 km	MPC · JPL
212596	2006 SF_{218}	—	September 27, 2006	La Sagra	OAM	·	1.4 km	MPC · JPL
212597	2006 SM_{220}	—	September 25, 2006	Kitt Peak	Spacewatch	·	4.9 km	MPC · JPL
212598	2006 SW_{230}	—	September 26, 2006	Kitt Peak	Spacewatch	AEO	2.0 km	MPC · JPL
212599	2006 SN_{239}	—	September 26, 2006	Kitt Peak	Spacewatch	THM	2.9 km	MPC · JPL
212600	2006 SN_{241}	—	September 26, 2006	Mount Lemmon	Mount Lemmon Survey	·	2.4 km	MPC · JPL

== 212601–212700 ==
back to top

Designation			Discovery			Properties		Ref
Permanent	Provisional	Named after	Date	Site	Discoverer(s)	Category	Diam.	Ref
212601	2006 SO_{273}	—	September 27, 2006	Mount Lemmon	Mount Lemmon Survey	·	3.8 km	MPC · JPL
212602	2006 SG_{274}	—	September 27, 2006	Kitt Peak	Spacewatch	EOS	2.7 km	MPC · JPL
212603	2006 SR_{275}	—	September 28, 2006	Kitt Peak	Spacewatch	·	1.8 km	MPC · JPL
212604	2006 SR_{279}	—	September 28, 2006	Kitt Peak	Spacewatch	·	1.9 km	MPC · JPL
212605	2006 SO_{281}	—	September 16, 2006	Catalina	CSS	·	3.8 km	MPC · JPL
212606 Janulis	2006 SF_{285}	Janulis	September 27, 2006	Moletai	K. Černis, Zdanavicius, J.	·	2.7 km	MPC · JPL
212607	2006 SN_{299}	—	September 26, 2006	Kitt Peak	Spacewatch	EOS	2.2 km	MPC · JPL
212608	2006 SL_{316}	—	September 27, 2006	Kitt Peak	Spacewatch	·	1.7 km	MPC · JPL
212609	2006 SB_{320}	—	September 27, 2006	Kitt Peak	Spacewatch	·	4.0 km	MPC · JPL
212610	2006 ST_{325}	—	September 27, 2006	Kitt Peak	Spacewatch	·	2.4 km	MPC · JPL
212611	2006 SU_{353}	—	September 30, 2006	Catalina	CSS	·	4.5 km	MPC · JPL
212612	2006 SQ_{358}	—	September 30, 2006	Catalina	CSS	·	4.9 km	MPC · JPL
212613	2006 SY_{365}	—	September 30, 2006	Mount Lemmon	Mount Lemmon Survey	·	2.8 km	MPC · JPL
212614	2006 SZ_{385}	—	September 29, 2006	Apache Point	A. C. Becker	(31811)	4.4 km	MPC · JPL
212615	2006 SV_{386}	—	September 30, 2006	Kitt Peak	Spacewatch	·	2.5 km	MPC · JPL
212616	2006 SF_{396}	—	September 16, 2006	Kitt Peak	Spacewatch	·	4.8 km	MPC · JPL
212617	2006 SJ_{399}	—	September 17, 2006	Kitt Peak	Spacewatch	·	1.5 km	MPC · JPL
212618	2006 SK_{407}	—	September 19, 2006	Kitt Peak	Spacewatch	·	2.3 km	MPC · JPL
212619	2006 TD_{9}	—	October 11, 2006	Kitt Peak	Spacewatch	·	5.0 km	MPC · JPL
212620	2006 TF_{15}	—	October 11, 2006	Kitt Peak	Spacewatch	·	5.5 km	MPC · JPL
212621	2006 TC_{18}	—	October 11, 2006	Kitt Peak	Spacewatch	·	2.1 km	MPC · JPL
212622	2006 TU_{21}	—	October 11, 2006	Kitt Peak	Spacewatch	·	4.4 km	MPC · JPL
212623	2006 TB_{22}	—	October 11, 2006	Kitt Peak	Spacewatch	·	3.5 km	MPC · JPL
212624	2006 TD_{25}	—	October 12, 2006	Kitt Peak	Spacewatch	(159)	3.2 km	MPC · JPL
212625	2006 TZ_{26}	—	October 12, 2006	Kitt Peak	Spacewatch	·	3.1 km	MPC · JPL
212626	2006 TZ_{27}	—	October 12, 2006	Kitt Peak	Spacewatch	·	5.9 km	MPC · JPL
212627	2006 TW_{28}	—	October 12, 2006	Kitt Peak	Spacewatch	THM	3.3 km	MPC · JPL
212628	2006 TR_{41}	—	October 12, 2006	Palomar	NEAT	·	5.1 km	MPC · JPL
212629	2006 TC_{49}	—	October 12, 2006	Palomar	NEAT	·	1.5 km	MPC · JPL
212630	2006 TK_{54}	—	October 12, 2006	Palomar	NEAT	HYG	5.7 km	MPC · JPL
212631 Hsinchu	2006 TW_{56}	Hsinchu	October 14, 2006	Lulin	Lin, C.-S., Q. Ye	·	4.1 km	MPC · JPL
212632	2006 TY_{94}	—	October 15, 2006	San Marcello	San Marcello	·	3.4 km	MPC · JPL
212633	2006 TV_{95}	—	October 12, 2006	Palomar	NEAT	EUN	1.8 km	MPC · JPL
212634	2006 TB_{105}	—	October 15, 2006	Kitt Peak	Spacewatch	·	3.4 km	MPC · JPL
212635	2006 TJ_{106}	—	October 15, 2006	Kitt Peak	Spacewatch	·	5.2 km	MPC · JPL
212636	2006 TQ_{109}	—	October 4, 2006	Mount Lemmon	Mount Lemmon Survey	·	6.5 km	MPC · JPL
212637	2006 TC_{110}	—	October 12, 2006	Palomar	NEAT	·	4.6 km	MPC · JPL
212638	2006 UE_{2}	—	October 16, 2006	Bergisch Gladbach	W. Bickel	·	3.5 km	MPC · JPL
212639	2006 UB_{5}	—	October 16, 2006	Kitt Peak	Spacewatch	·	1.9 km	MPC · JPL
212640	2006 UD_{25}	—	October 16, 2006	Kitt Peak	Spacewatch	·	2.0 km	MPC · JPL
212641	2006 UP_{28}	—	October 16, 2006	Kitt Peak	Spacewatch	·	4.0 km	MPC · JPL
212642	2006 UJ_{33}	—	October 16, 2006	Kitt Peak	Spacewatch	THM	3.2 km	MPC · JPL
212643	2006 UW_{35}	—	October 16, 2006	Kitt Peak	Spacewatch	·	3.8 km	MPC · JPL
212644	2006 UA_{38}	—	October 16, 2006	Kitt Peak	Spacewatch	·	3.8 km	MPC · JPL
212645	2006 UF_{39}	—	October 16, 2006	Kitt Peak	Spacewatch	·	2.3 km	MPC · JPL
212646	2006 UV_{52}	—	October 17, 2006	Mount Lemmon	Mount Lemmon Survey	·	2.0 km	MPC · JPL
212647	2006 UX_{67}	—	October 16, 2006	Catalina	CSS	EOS	2.4 km	MPC · JPL
212648	2006 UH_{68}	—	October 16, 2006	Catalina	CSS	·	4.9 km	MPC · JPL
212649	2006 UW_{80}	—	October 17, 2006	Catalina	CSS	·	3.1 km	MPC · JPL
212650	2006 UF_{91}	—	October 17, 2006	Kitt Peak	Spacewatch	EOS · fast	2.4 km	MPC · JPL
212651	2006 UK_{103}	—	October 18, 2006	Kitt Peak	Spacewatch	·	4.5 km	MPC · JPL
212652	2006 UF_{116}	—	October 19, 2006	Catalina	CSS	·	1.3 km	MPC · JPL
212653	2006 UG_{124}	—	October 19, 2006	Catalina	CSS	EOS	3.4 km	MPC · JPL
212654	2006 UM_{125}	—	October 19, 2006	Kitt Peak	Spacewatch	EOS	1.9 km	MPC · JPL
212655	2006 UN_{135}	—	October 19, 2006	Kitt Peak	Spacewatch	·	2.9 km	MPC · JPL
212656	2006 UW_{163}	—	October 21, 2006	Mount Lemmon	Mount Lemmon Survey	·	1.8 km	MPC · JPL
212657	2006 UF_{173}	—	October 22, 2006	Kitt Peak	Spacewatch	·	800 m	MPC · JPL
212658	2006 UX_{178}	—	October 16, 2006	Catalina	CSS	·	3.6 km	MPC · JPL
212659	2006 UQ_{195}	—	October 20, 2006	Kitt Peak	Spacewatch	·	720 m	MPC · JPL
212660	2006 US_{195}	—	October 20, 2006	Mount Lemmon	Mount Lemmon Survey	·	2.8 km	MPC · JPL
212661	2006 UL_{213}	—	October 23, 2006	Kitt Peak	Spacewatch	·	2.5 km	MPC · JPL
212662	2006 UV_{218}	—	October 16, 2006	Catalina	CSS	·	2.9 km	MPC · JPL
212663	2006 UB_{233}	—	October 21, 2006	Palomar	NEAT	·	2.5 km	MPC · JPL
212664	2006 UF_{233}	—	October 21, 2006	Palomar	NEAT	·	3.5 km	MPC · JPL
212665	2006 UR_{237}	—	October 23, 2006	Kitt Peak	Spacewatch	·	4.6 km	MPC · JPL
212666	2006 UY_{246}	—	October 27, 2006	Mount Lemmon	Mount Lemmon Survey	·	3.7 km	MPC · JPL
212667	2006 UU_{253}	—	October 27, 2006	Mount Lemmon	Mount Lemmon Survey	THM	3.1 km	MPC · JPL
212668	2006 UL_{256}	—	October 28, 2006	Kitt Peak	Spacewatch	KOR	1.8 km	MPC · JPL
212669	2006 UL_{278}	—	October 28, 2006	Kitt Peak	Spacewatch	CYB	7.3 km	MPC · JPL
212670	2006 UB_{322}	—	October 16, 2006	Kitt Peak	Spacewatch	KOR	2.1 km	MPC · JPL
212671	2006 UB_{328}	—	October 19, 2006	Mount Lemmon	Mount Lemmon Survey	NAE	4.7 km	MPC · JPL
212672	2006 UP_{332}	—	October 21, 2006	Apache Point	A. C. Becker	EOS	2.5 km	MPC · JPL
212673	2006 UO_{333}	—	October 22, 2006	Apache Point	A. C. Becker	VER	3.2 km	MPC · JPL
212674	2006 VL_{1}	—	November 1, 2006	Mount Lemmon	Mount Lemmon Survey	·	4.1 km	MPC · JPL
212675	2006 VN_{17}	—	November 9, 2006	Kitt Peak	Spacewatch	·	3.7 km	MPC · JPL
212676	2006 VK_{21}	—	November 10, 2006	Kitt Peak	Spacewatch	·	2.1 km	MPC · JPL
212677	2006 VE_{45}	—	November 9, 2006	Altschwendt	W. Ries	·	4.8 km	MPC · JPL
212678	2006 VX_{59}	—	November 11, 2006	Kitt Peak	Spacewatch	·	3.7 km	MPC · JPL
212679	2006 VK_{67}	—	November 11, 2006	Kitt Peak	Spacewatch	·	5.3 km	MPC · JPL
212680	2006 VZ_{97}	—	November 11, 2006	Kitt Peak	Spacewatch	·	2.2 km	MPC · JPL
212681	2006 VP_{99}	—	November 11, 2006	Mount Lemmon	Mount Lemmon Survey	·	3.4 km	MPC · JPL
212682	2006 VT_{109}	—	November 13, 2006	Catalina	CSS	·	1.9 km	MPC · JPL
212683	2006 VL_{169}	—	November 11, 2006	Kitt Peak	Spacewatch	·	1.5 km	MPC · JPL
212684	2006 WF_{60}	—	November 17, 2006	Socorro	LINEAR	·	2.5 km	MPC · JPL
212685	2006 WK_{70}	—	November 18, 2006	Kitt Peak	Spacewatch	GEF	1.7 km	MPC · JPL
212686	2006 WV_{74}	—	November 18, 2006	Kitt Peak	Spacewatch	·	4.9 km	MPC · JPL
212687	2006 WL_{82}	—	November 18, 2006	Kitt Peak	Spacewatch	·	2.3 km	MPC · JPL
212688	2006 WR_{106}	—	November 19, 2006	Catalina	CSS	·	900 m	MPC · JPL
212689	2006 WF_{159}	—	November 22, 2006	Kitt Peak	Spacewatch	3:2	5.5 km	MPC · JPL
212690	2006 WW_{181}	—	November 24, 2006	Mount Lemmon	Mount Lemmon Survey	3:2	6.6 km	MPC · JPL
212691	2006 XJ_{25}	—	December 12, 2006	Socorro	LINEAR	·	3.9 km	MPC · JPL
212692 Lazauskaitė	2007 FT_{20}	Lazauskaitė	March 23, 2007	Moletai	K. Černis, Zdanavicius, J.	EOS	2.9 km	MPC · JPL
212693	2007 HD_{18}	—	April 16, 2007	Catalina	CSS	NEM	5.1 km	MPC · JPL
212694	2007 PT_{11}	—	August 12, 2007	XuYi	PMO NEO Survey Program	L4	14 km	MPC · JPL
212695	2007 PQ_{38}	—	August 14, 2007	Siding Spring	SSS	H	700 m	MPC · JPL
212696	2007 PH_{39}	—	August 15, 2007	La Sagra	OAM	NYS	1.8 km	MPC · JPL
212697	2007 PF_{40}	—	August 10, 2007	Kitt Peak	Spacewatch	·	1.2 km	MPC · JPL
212698	2007 PA_{41}	—	August 13, 2007	Socorro	LINEAR	·	2.0 km	MPC · JPL
212699	2007 QN_{3}	—	August 23, 2007	Dauban	Chante-Perdrix	·	1.1 km	MPC · JPL
212700	2007 QJ_{6}	—	August 21, 2007	Anderson Mesa	LONEOS	·	1.1 km	MPC · JPL

== 212701–212800 ==
back to top

Designation			Discovery			Properties		Ref
Permanent	Provisional	Named after	Date	Site	Discoverer(s)	Category	Diam.	Ref
212701	2007 QR_{9}	—	August 22, 2007	Socorro	LINEAR	MAS	1.1 km	MPC · JPL
212702	2007 QQ_{11}	—	August 23, 2007	Kitt Peak	Spacewatch	·	840 m	MPC · JPL
212703	2007 RA_{13}	—	September 2, 2007	Catalina	CSS	·	1.8 km	MPC · JPL
212704	2007 RA_{14}	—	September 8, 2007	La Sagra	OAM	·	1.7 km	MPC · JPL
212705 Friûl	2007 RF_{15}	Friûl	September 12, 2007	Remanzacco	Remanzacco	·	1.4 km	MPC · JPL
212706	2007 RU_{16}	—	September 12, 2007	Goodricke-Pigott	R. A. Tucker	·	1.0 km	MPC · JPL
212707	2007 RD_{17}	—	September 13, 2007	Mount Lemmon	Mount Lemmon Survey	H	850 m	MPC · JPL
212708	2007 RW_{24}	—	September 4, 2007	Mount Lemmon	Mount Lemmon Survey	V	650 m	MPC · JPL
212709	2007 RC_{39}	—	September 8, 2007	Catalina	CSS	·	3.7 km	MPC · JPL
212710	2007 RS_{39}	—	September 9, 2007	Kitt Peak	Spacewatch	H	750 m	MPC · JPL
212711	2007 RE_{45}	—	September 9, 2007	Kitt Peak	Spacewatch	·	1.9 km	MPC · JPL
212712	2007 RW_{46}	—	September 9, 2007	Kitt Peak	Spacewatch	·	1.9 km	MPC · JPL
212713	2007 RN_{57}	—	September 9, 2007	Kitt Peak	Spacewatch	·	860 m	MPC · JPL
212714	2007 RY_{57}	—	September 9, 2007	Anderson Mesa	LONEOS	·	3.0 km	MPC · JPL
212715	2007 RO_{92}	—	September 10, 2007	Mount Lemmon	Mount Lemmon Survey	·	1.1 km	MPC · JPL
212716	2007 RY_{103}	—	September 11, 2007	Catalina	CSS	·	1.4 km	MPC · JPL
212717	2007 RH_{118}	—	September 11, 2007	Mount Lemmon	Mount Lemmon Survey	·	1.9 km	MPC · JPL
212718	2007 RO_{126}	—	September 12, 2007	Mount Lemmon	Mount Lemmon Survey	·	1.4 km	MPC · JPL
212719	2007 RN_{127}	—	September 12, 2007	Mount Lemmon	Mount Lemmon Survey	·	680 m	MPC · JPL
212720	2007 RA_{128}	—	September 12, 2007	Mount Lemmon	Mount Lemmon Survey	·	1.4 km	MPC · JPL
212721	2007 RX_{134}	—	September 12, 2007	Anderson Mesa	LONEOS	·	1.2 km	MPC · JPL
212722	2007 RM_{135}	—	September 13, 2007	Anderson Mesa	LONEOS	·	1.2 km	MPC · JPL
212723 Klitschko	2007 RN_{138}	Klitschko	September 14, 2007	Andrushivka	Andrushivka	·	1.7 km	MPC · JPL
212724	2007 RP_{144}	—	September 14, 2007	Socorro	LINEAR	V	910 m	MPC · JPL
212725	2007 RC_{145}	—	September 14, 2007	Socorro	LINEAR	·	1.1 km	MPC · JPL
212726	2007 RD_{145}	—	September 14, 2007	Socorro	LINEAR	·	940 m	MPC · JPL
212727	2007 RW_{161}	—	September 13, 2007	Mount Lemmon	Mount Lemmon Survey	·	1 km	MPC · JPL
212728	2007 RK_{162}	—	September 13, 2007	Mount Lemmon	Mount Lemmon Survey	·	1.4 km	MPC · JPL
212729	2007 RJ_{168}	—	September 10, 2007	Kitt Peak	Spacewatch	·	1.2 km	MPC · JPL
212730	2007 RG_{184}	—	September 13, 2007	Kitt Peak	Spacewatch	·	1.5 km	MPC · JPL
212731	2007 RF_{188}	—	September 9, 2007	Kitt Peak	Spacewatch	·	1.6 km	MPC · JPL
212732	2007 RL_{193}	—	September 12, 2007	Catalina	CSS	·	1.5 km	MPC · JPL
212733	2007 RV_{194}	—	September 12, 2007	Anderson Mesa	LONEOS	·	2.1 km	MPC · JPL
212734	2007 RX_{235}	—	September 12, 2007	Mount Lemmon	Mount Lemmon Survey	·	1.1 km	MPC · JPL
212735	2007 RT_{242}	—	September 15, 2007	Socorro	LINEAR	·	1.4 km	MPC · JPL
212736	2007 RC_{244}	—	September 15, 2007	Socorro	LINEAR	·	1.5 km	MPC · JPL
212737	2007 RZ_{252}	—	September 13, 2007	Mount Lemmon	Mount Lemmon Survey	EUN	1.6 km	MPC · JPL
212738	2007 RJ_{271}	—	September 15, 2007	Mount Lemmon	Mount Lemmon Survey	AGN	1.6 km	MPC · JPL
212739	2007 RN_{271}	—	September 15, 2007	Mount Lemmon	Mount Lemmon Survey	·	1.8 km	MPC · JPL
212740	2007 RZ_{273}	—	September 15, 2007	Kitt Peak	Spacewatch	·	1.8 km	MPC · JPL
212741	2007 RH_{277}	—	September 5, 2007	Catalina	CSS	MAR	1.3 km	MPC · JPL
212742	2007 RU_{277}	—	September 5, 2007	Catalina	CSS	·	5.5 km	MPC · JPL
212743	2007 RT_{289}	—	September 14, 2007	Catalina	CSS	T_{j} (2.98) · EUP	5.2 km	MPC · JPL
212744	2007 RL_{296}	—	September 15, 2007	Mount Lemmon	Mount Lemmon Survey	·	1.3 km	MPC · JPL
212745	2007 SG_{19}	—	September 18, 2007	Mount Lemmon	Mount Lemmon Survey	·	1.7 km	MPC · JPL
212746	2007 SF_{20}	—	September 18, 2007	Mount Lemmon	Mount Lemmon Survey	(5)	1.7 km	MPC · JPL
212747	2007 TY	—	October 2, 2007	Charleston	Astronomical Research Observatory	·	2.1 km	MPC · JPL
212748	2007 TB_{2}	—	October 4, 2007	Kitt Peak	Spacewatch	·	850 m	MPC · JPL
212749	2007 TM_{4}	—	October 6, 2007	7300	W. K. Y. Yeung	·	1.3 km	MPC · JPL
212750	2007 TW_{6}	—	October 6, 2007	La Sagra	OAM	V	1.1 km	MPC · JPL
212751	2007 TD_{9}	—	October 6, 2007	Socorro	LINEAR	·	2.4 km	MPC · JPL
212752	2007 TA_{10}	—	October 6, 2007	Socorro	LINEAR	·	1.6 km	MPC · JPL
212753	2007 TE_{11}	—	October 6, 2007	Socorro	LINEAR	·	2.0 km	MPC · JPL
212754	2007 TL_{12}	—	October 6, 2007	Socorro	LINEAR	(5)	1.5 km	MPC · JPL
212755	2007 TW_{12}	—	October 6, 2007	Socorro	LINEAR	·	1.2 km	MPC · JPL
212756	2007 TY_{16}	—	October 7, 2007	Calvin-Rehoboth	Calvin College	·	1.3 km	MPC · JPL
212757	2007 TZ_{19}	—	October 6, 2007	Socorro	LINEAR	·	1.9 km	MPC · JPL
212758	2007 TR_{27}	—	October 4, 2007	Kitt Peak	Spacewatch	·	1.1 km	MPC · JPL
212759	2007 TM_{29}	—	October 4, 2007	Kitt Peak	Spacewatch	·	1.4 km	MPC · JPL
212760	2007 TF_{38}	—	October 4, 2007	Catalina	CSS	·	920 m	MPC · JPL
212761	2007 TA_{40}	—	October 6, 2007	Kitt Peak	Spacewatch	GEF	1.8 km	MPC · JPL
212762	2007 TN_{40}	—	October 6, 2007	Kitt Peak	Spacewatch	AGN	1.7 km	MPC · JPL
212763	2007 TH_{44}	—	October 7, 2007	Kitt Peak	Spacewatch	·	2.2 km	MPC · JPL
212764	2007 TU_{57}	—	October 4, 2007	Kitt Peak	Spacewatch	·	2.1 km	MPC · JPL
212765	2007 TK_{63}	—	October 7, 2007	Mount Lemmon	Mount Lemmon Survey	·	1.3 km	MPC · JPL
212766	2007 TK_{66}	—	October 8, 2007	Pla D'Arguines	R. Ferrando	·	3.1 km	MPC · JPL
212767	2007 TG_{70}	—	October 10, 2007	Mount Lemmon	Mount Lemmon Survey	·	1.7 km	MPC · JPL
212768	2007 TO_{70}	—	October 12, 2007	Goodricke-Pigott	R. A. Tucker	HYG	4.1 km	MPC · JPL
212769	2007 TZ_{78}	—	October 5, 2007	Kitt Peak	Spacewatch	·	1.0 km	MPC · JPL
212770	2007 TL_{79}	—	October 5, 2007	Kitt Peak	Spacewatch	·	2.2 km	MPC · JPL
212771	2007 TZ_{87}	—	October 8, 2007	Mount Lemmon	Mount Lemmon Survey	·	2.3 km	MPC · JPL
212772	2007 TZ_{92}	—	October 6, 2007	Kitt Peak	Spacewatch	·	2.7 km	MPC · JPL
212773	2007 TA_{115}	—	October 8, 2007	Anderson Mesa	LONEOS	·	2.0 km	MPC · JPL
212774	2007 TR_{118}	—	October 9, 2007	Anderson Mesa	LONEOS	·	2.0 km	MPC · JPL
212775	2007 TC_{120}	—	October 7, 2007	Catalina	CSS	NYS	1.6 km	MPC · JPL
212776	2007 TQ_{125}	—	October 6, 2007	Kitt Peak	Spacewatch	MIS	3.6 km	MPC · JPL
212777	2007 TH_{139}	—	October 9, 2007	Kitt Peak	Spacewatch	·	1.6 km	MPC · JPL
212778	2007 TW_{141}	—	October 9, 2007	Mount Lemmon	Mount Lemmon Survey	MAS	770 m	MPC · JPL
212779	2007 TA_{143}	—	October 15, 2007	Dauban	Chante-Perdrix	·	720 m	MPC · JPL
212780	2007 TQ_{158}	—	October 9, 2007	Socorro	LINEAR	·	1.3 km	MPC · JPL
212781	2007 TU_{165}	—	October 11, 2007	Socorro	LINEAR	·	2.9 km	MPC · JPL
212782	2007 TT_{186}	—	October 13, 2007	Socorro	LINEAR	·	1.6 km	MPC · JPL
212783	2007 TO_{203}	—	October 8, 2007	Mount Lemmon	Mount Lemmon Survey	·	4.4 km	MPC · JPL
212784	2007 TV_{212}	—	October 7, 2007	Kitt Peak	Spacewatch	·	960 m	MPC · JPL
212785	2007 TG_{213}	—	October 7, 2007	Kitt Peak	Spacewatch	·	1.2 km	MPC · JPL
212786	2007 TC_{217}	—	October 7, 2007	Kitt Peak	Spacewatch	·	1.9 km	MPC · JPL
212787	2007 TF_{221}	—	October 9, 2007	Kitt Peak	Spacewatch	·	1.0 km	MPC · JPL
212788	2007 TK_{221}	—	October 9, 2007	Kitt Peak	Spacewatch	MAS	980 m	MPC · JPL
212789	2007 TH_{226}	—	October 8, 2007	Catalina	CSS	V	820 m	MPC · JPL
212790	2007 TX_{228}	—	October 8, 2007	Kitt Peak	Spacewatch	·	2.0 km	MPC · JPL
212791	2007 TN_{232}	—	October 8, 2007	Kitt Peak	Spacewatch	·	2.2 km	MPC · JPL
212792	2007 TZ_{233}	—	October 8, 2007	Kitt Peak	Spacewatch	·	3.7 km	MPC · JPL
212793	2007 TQ_{242}	—	October 8, 2007	Catalina	CSS	·	6.0 km	MPC · JPL
212794	2007 TM_{243}	—	October 8, 2007	Catalina	CSS	·	2.3 km	MPC · JPL
212795 Fangjiancheng	2007 TD_{247}	Fangjiancheng	October 9, 2007	XuYi	PMO NEO Survey Program	·	980 m	MPC · JPL
212796 Guoyonghuai	2007 TE_{247}	Guoyonghuai	October 9, 2007	XuYi	PMO NEO Survey Program	·	2.5 km	MPC · JPL
212797 Lipei	2007 TG_{247}	Lipei	October 9, 2007	XuYi	PMO NEO Survey Program	PAD	2.2 km	MPC · JPL
212798	2007 TK_{257}	—	October 10, 2007	Kitt Peak	Spacewatch	V	890 m	MPC · JPL
212799	2007 TB_{289}	—	October 11, 2007	Catalina	CSS	·	6.6 km	MPC · JPL
212800	2007 TN_{292}	—	October 8, 2007	Mount Lemmon	Mount Lemmon Survey	·	1.2 km	MPC · JPL

== 212801–212900 ==
back to top

Designation			Discovery			Properties		Ref
Permanent	Provisional	Named after	Date	Site	Discoverer(s)	Category	Diam.	Ref
212801	2007 TR_{299}	—	October 12, 2007	Kitt Peak	Spacewatch	·	1.1 km	MPC · JPL
212802	2007 TZ_{315}	—	October 12, 2007	Kitt Peak	Spacewatch	·	1.1 km	MPC · JPL
212803	2007 TS_{317}	—	October 12, 2007	Kitt Peak	Spacewatch	·	1.9 km	MPC · JPL
212804	2007 TY_{358}	—	October 14, 2007	Kitt Peak	Spacewatch	·	1.8 km	MPC · JPL
212805	2007 TU_{361}	—	October 14, 2007	Mount Lemmon	Mount Lemmon Survey	·	1.5 km	MPC · JPL
212806	2007 TK_{362}	—	October 14, 2007	Mount Lemmon	Mount Lemmon Survey	·	2.3 km	MPC · JPL
212807	2007 TR_{366}	—	October 9, 2007	Kitt Peak	Spacewatch	·	2.3 km	MPC · JPL
212808	2007 TK_{368}	—	October 10, 2007	Catalina	CSS	·	2.1 km	MPC · JPL
212809	2007 TW_{379}	—	October 14, 2007	Kitt Peak	Spacewatch	·	1.4 km	MPC · JPL
212810	2007 TK_{380}	—	October 14, 2007	Kitt Peak	Spacewatch	AGN	1.6 km	MPC · JPL
212811	2007 TE_{388}	—	October 13, 2007	Mount Lemmon	Mount Lemmon Survey	·	1.4 km	MPC · JPL
212812	2007 TX_{391}	—	October 15, 2007	Catalina	CSS	·	3.0 km	MPC · JPL
212813	2007 TH_{392}	—	October 15, 2007	Catalina	CSS	·	1.6 km	MPC · JPL
212814	2007 TC_{400}	—	October 15, 2007	Kitt Peak	Spacewatch	·	1.1 km	MPC · JPL
212815	2007 TF_{430}	—	October 13, 2007	Kitt Peak	Spacewatch	·	3.0 km	MPC · JPL
212816	2007 TM_{436}	—	October 7, 2007	Anderson Mesa	LONEOS	(17392)	2.2 km	MPC · JPL
212817	2007 UH_{1}	—	October 16, 2007	Bisei SG Center	BATTeRS	THM	2.9 km	MPC · JPL
212818	2007 UN_{1}	—	October 16, 2007	Bisei SG Center	BATTeRS	·	1.9 km	MPC · JPL
212819	2007 UJ_{2}	—	October 18, 2007	Mayhill	Lowe, A.	·	1.5 km	MPC · JPL
212820	2007 UJ_{14}	—	October 16, 2007	Kitt Peak	Spacewatch	·	2.1 km	MPC · JPL
212821	2007 UV_{15}	—	October 18, 2007	Mount Lemmon	Mount Lemmon Survey	·	1.5 km	MPC · JPL
212822	2007 UU_{17}	—	October 18, 2007	Kitt Peak	Spacewatch	·	890 m	MPC · JPL
212823	2007 UW_{19}	—	October 18, 2007	Mount Lemmon	Mount Lemmon Survey	(12739)	2.0 km	MPC · JPL
212824	2007 UL_{25}	—	October 16, 2007	Kitt Peak	Spacewatch	·	960 m	MPC · JPL
212825	2007 UV_{25}	—	October 16, 2007	Kitt Peak	Spacewatch	GEF	1.6 km	MPC · JPL
212826	2007 UZ_{31}	—	October 19, 2007	Anderson Mesa	LONEOS	NYS	1.7 km	MPC · JPL
212827	2007 UT_{33}	—	October 16, 2007	Catalina	CSS	·	1.6 km	MPC · JPL
212828	2007 UP_{47}	—	October 19, 2007	Anderson Mesa	LONEOS	·	2.6 km	MPC · JPL
212829	2007 UE_{50}	—	October 24, 2007	Mount Lemmon	Mount Lemmon Survey	·	2.1 km	MPC · JPL
212830	2007 UC_{55}	—	October 30, 2007	Kitt Peak	Spacewatch	·	2.3 km	MPC · JPL
212831	2007 UK_{64}	—	October 30, 2007	Catalina	CSS	·	810 m	MPC · JPL
212832	2007 UX_{66}	—	October 30, 2007	Kitt Peak	Spacewatch	·	1.5 km	MPC · JPL
212833	2007 UO_{67}	—	October 30, 2007	Mount Lemmon	Mount Lemmon Survey	·	920 m	MPC · JPL
212834	2007 UO_{71}	—	October 30, 2007	Catalina	CSS	·	2.6 km	MPC · JPL
212835	2007 UX_{71}	—	October 31, 2007	Kitt Peak	Spacewatch	·	1.7 km	MPC · JPL
212836	2007 UN_{83}	—	October 30, 2007	Kitt Peak	Spacewatch	·	2.0 km	MPC · JPL
212837	2007 UQ_{84}	—	October 30, 2007	Kitt Peak	Spacewatch	MAS	910 m	MPC · JPL
212838	2007 UX_{84}	—	October 30, 2007	Kitt Peak	Spacewatch	·	3.4 km	MPC · JPL
212839	2007 UR_{85}	—	October 30, 2007	Kitt Peak	Spacewatch	KOR	1.9 km	MPC · JPL
212840	2007 UU_{91}	—	October 30, 2007	Mount Lemmon	Mount Lemmon Survey	THM	2.6 km	MPC · JPL
212841	2007 UV_{98}	—	October 30, 2007	Kitt Peak	Spacewatch	·	2.4 km	MPC · JPL
212842	2007 UH_{104}	—	October 30, 2007	Kitt Peak	Spacewatch	V	980 m	MPC · JPL
212843	2007 UV_{112}	—	October 30, 2007	Mount Lemmon	Mount Lemmon Survey	·	1.2 km	MPC · JPL
212844	2007 UU_{121}	—	October 30, 2007	Kitt Peak	Spacewatch	·	1.6 km	MPC · JPL
212845	2007 VD_{2}	—	November 2, 2007	Socorro	LINEAR	·	1.1 km	MPC · JPL
212846	2007 VP_{7}	—	November 3, 2007	Junk Bond	D. Healy	HNS	1.8 km	MPC · JPL
212847	2007 VD_{19}	—	November 1, 2007	Mount Lemmon	Mount Lemmon Survey	·	1.4 km	MPC · JPL
212848	2007 VW_{34}	—	November 3, 2007	7300	W. K. Y. Yeung	·	3.0 km	MPC · JPL
212849	2007 VJ_{36}	—	November 2, 2007	Mount Lemmon	Mount Lemmon Survey	·	1.3 km	MPC · JPL
212850	2007 VL_{54}	—	November 1, 2007	Kitt Peak	Spacewatch	·	2.0 km	MPC · JPL
212851	2007 VN_{60}	—	November 1, 2007	Kitt Peak	Spacewatch	·	2.2 km	MPC · JPL
212852	2007 VM_{63}	—	November 1, 2007	Kitt Peak	Spacewatch	·	2.2 km	MPC · JPL
212853	2007 VS_{63}	—	November 1, 2007	Kitt Peak	Spacewatch	·	2.7 km	MPC · JPL
212854	2007 VU_{72}	—	November 1, 2007	Kitt Peak	Spacewatch	·	1.4 km	MPC · JPL
212855	2007 VW_{72}	—	November 1, 2007	Kitt Peak	Spacewatch	·	2.1 km	MPC · JPL
212856	2007 VX_{73}	—	November 3, 2007	Kitt Peak	Spacewatch	·	1.4 km	MPC · JPL
212857	2007 VK_{84}	—	November 5, 2007	Catalina	CSS	·	2.5 km	MPC · JPL
212858	2007 VM_{85}	—	November 2, 2007	Socorro	LINEAR	V	920 m	MPC · JPL
212859	2007 VQ_{91}	—	November 7, 2007	Bisei SG Center	BATTeRS	·	1.5 km	MPC · JPL
212860	2007 VJ_{105}	—	November 3, 2007	Kitt Peak	Spacewatch	·	2.3 km	MPC · JPL
212861	2007 VZ_{106}	—	November 3, 2007	Kitt Peak	Spacewatch	·	1.7 km	MPC · JPL
212862	2007 VF_{111}	—	November 3, 2007	Kitt Peak	Spacewatch	·	990 m	MPC · JPL
212863	2007 VN_{114}	—	November 3, 2007	Kitt Peak	Spacewatch	·	1.6 km	MPC · JPL
212864	2007 VN_{115}	—	November 3, 2007	Kitt Peak	Spacewatch	·	3.3 km	MPC · JPL
212865	2007 VX_{119}	—	November 5, 2007	Kitt Peak	Spacewatch	·	1.9 km	MPC · JPL
212866	2007 VL_{123}	—	November 5, 2007	Mount Lemmon	Mount Lemmon Survey	·	1.4 km	MPC · JPL
212867	2007 VL_{127}	—	November 1, 2007	Mount Lemmon	Mount Lemmon Survey	·	1.1 km	MPC · JPL
212868	2007 VB_{143}	—	November 4, 2007	Kitt Peak	Spacewatch	·	2.2 km	MPC · JPL
212869	2007 VW_{152}	—	November 2, 2007	Kitt Peak	Spacewatch	HOF	4.4 km	MPC · JPL
212870	2007 VX_{166}	—	November 5, 2007	Mount Lemmon	Mount Lemmon Survey	·	1.8 km	MPC · JPL
212871	2007 VG_{169}	—	November 5, 2007	Kitt Peak	Spacewatch	·	3.0 km	MPC · JPL
212872	2007 VT_{173}	—	November 2, 2007	Catalina	CSS	·	2.8 km	MPC · JPL
212873	2007 VP_{184}	—	November 6, 2007	Marly	P. Kocher	PAD	2.4 km	MPC · JPL
212874	2007 VC_{185}	—	November 12, 2007	Bisei SG Center	BATTeRS	·	2.6 km	MPC · JPL
212875	2007 VM_{188}	—	November 7, 2007	Socorro	LINEAR	·	770 m	MPC · JPL
212876	2007 VD_{219}	—	November 9, 2007	Kitt Peak	Spacewatch	HOF	3.8 km	MPC · JPL
212877	2007 VB_{229}	—	November 7, 2007	Kitt Peak	Spacewatch	(5)	1.6 km	MPC · JPL
212878	2007 VA_{230}	—	November 7, 2007	Kitt Peak	Spacewatch	·	800 m	MPC · JPL
212879	2007 VH_{230}	—	November 7, 2007	Kitt Peak	Spacewatch	MAS	1.2 km	MPC · JPL
212880	2007 VK_{232}	—	November 7, 2007	Kitt Peak	Spacewatch	·	1.4 km	MPC · JPL
212881	2007 VC_{235}	—	November 9, 2007	Kitt Peak	Spacewatch	·	3.6 km	MPC · JPL
212882	2007 VT_{238}	—	November 13, 2007	Kitt Peak	Spacewatch	·	2.9 km	MPC · JPL
212883	2007 VV_{241}	—	November 12, 2007	Catalina	CSS	·	1.1 km	MPC · JPL
212884	2007 VD_{252}	—	November 12, 2007	Mount Lemmon	Mount Lemmon Survey	AGN	1.8 km	MPC · JPL
212885	2007 VP_{253}	—	November 14, 2007	Anderson Mesa	LONEOS	·	4.0 km	MPC · JPL
212886	2007 VC_{270}	—	November 15, 2007	Socorro	LINEAR	·	1.1 km	MPC · JPL
212887	2007 VV_{272}	—	November 11, 2007	Catalina	CSS	HNS	1.5 km	MPC · JPL
212888	2007 VU_{284}	—	November 14, 2007	Kitt Peak	Spacewatch	·	3.0 km	MPC · JPL
212889	2007 VK_{286}	—	November 14, 2007	Kitt Peak	Spacewatch	·	1.8 km	MPC · JPL
212890	2007 VE_{287}	—	November 15, 2007	Anderson Mesa	LONEOS	·	1.2 km	MPC · JPL
212891	2007 VW_{290}	—	November 14, 2007	Kitt Peak	Spacewatch	·	2.6 km	MPC · JPL
212892	2007 VV_{291}	—	November 14, 2007	Kitt Peak	Spacewatch	·	2.0 km	MPC · JPL
212893	2007 VG_{293}	—	November 15, 2007	Catalina	CSS	VER	3.1 km	MPC · JPL
212894	2007 VV_{306}	—	November 2, 2007	Kitt Peak	Spacewatch	·	3.2 km	MPC · JPL
212895	2007 VS_{309}	—	November 2, 2007	Kitt Peak	Spacewatch	·	1.6 km	MPC · JPL
212896	2007 WR	—	November 17, 2007	La Cañada	Lacruz, J.	KOR	2.1 km	MPC · JPL
212897	2007 WE_{4}	—	November 18, 2007	Socorro	LINEAR	·	940 m	MPC · JPL
212898	2007 WT_{5}	—	November 17, 2007	Socorro	LINEAR	·	2.7 km	MPC · JPL
212899	2007 WH_{11}	—	November 17, 2007	Catalina	CSS	·	2.3 km	MPC · JPL
212900	2007 WH_{18}	—	November 18, 2007	Mount Lemmon	Mount Lemmon Survey	KOR	1.8 km	MPC · JPL

== 212901–213000 ==
back to top

Designation			Discovery			Properties		Ref
Permanent	Provisional	Named after	Date	Site	Discoverer(s)	Category	Diam.	Ref
212901	2007 WR_{18}	—	November 18, 2007	Mount Lemmon	Mount Lemmon Survey	·	1.3 km	MPC · JPL
212902	2007 WY_{31}	—	November 19, 2007	Mount Lemmon	Mount Lemmon Survey	·	4.0 km	MPC · JPL
212903	2007 WZ_{38}	—	November 19, 2007	Kitt Peak	Spacewatch	HYG	3.5 km	MPC · JPL
212904	2007 XB_{4}	—	December 3, 2007	Catalina	CSS	·	5.0 km	MPC · JPL
212905	2007 XN_{4}	—	December 3, 2007	Catalina	CSS	THM	2.7 km	MPC · JPL
212906	2007 XN_{7}	—	December 4, 2007	Catalina	CSS	·	1.7 km	MPC · JPL
212907	2007 XO_{7}	—	December 4, 2007	Catalina	CSS	·	5.2 km	MPC · JPL
212908	2007 XD_{8}	—	December 4, 2007	Mount Lemmon	Mount Lemmon Survey	·	2.8 km	MPC · JPL
212909	2007 XQ_{15}	—	December 8, 2007	Bisei SG Center	BATTeRS	·	2.3 km	MPC · JPL
212910	2007 XF_{22}	—	December 10, 2007	Socorro	LINEAR	·	2.5 km	MPC · JPL
212911	2007 XG_{22}	—	December 10, 2007	Socorro	LINEAR	·	2.6 km	MPC · JPL
212912	2007 XY_{34}	—	December 13, 2007	Socorro	LINEAR	·	2.0 km	MPC · JPL
212913	2007 XF_{38}	—	December 13, 2007	Socorro	LINEAR	·	2.1 km	MPC · JPL
212914	2007 XL_{44}	—	December 15, 2007	Kitt Peak	Spacewatch	·	3.5 km	MPC · JPL
212915	2007 XH_{47}	—	December 15, 2007	Kitt Peak	Spacewatch	KOR	2.2 km	MPC · JPL
212916	2007 XM_{50}	—	December 11, 2007	Cerro Burek	Burek, Cerro	·	3.4 km	MPC · JPL
212917	2007 YR	—	December 16, 2007	Bergisch Gladbach	W. Bickel	·	3.1 km	MPC · JPL
212918	2007 YL_{4}	—	December 16, 2007	Kitt Peak	Spacewatch	·	1.0 km	MPC · JPL
212919	2007 YL_{13}	—	December 17, 2007	Mount Lemmon	Mount Lemmon Survey	·	5.4 km	MPC · JPL
212920	2007 YN_{21}	—	December 16, 2007	Kitt Peak	Spacewatch	·	2.3 km	MPC · JPL
212921	2007 YD_{23}	—	December 16, 2007	Mount Lemmon	Mount Lemmon Survey	·	4.7 km	MPC · JPL
212922	2007 YL_{32}	—	December 28, 2007	Kitt Peak	Spacewatch	·	3.6 km	MPC · JPL
212923	2007 YZ_{53}	—	December 31, 2007	Catalina	CSS	·	2.3 km	MPC · JPL
212924 Yurishevchuk	2008 AK_{1}	Yurishevchuk	January 6, 2008	Zelenchukskaya Stn	Zelenchukskaya Stn	·	4.7 km	MPC · JPL
212925	2008 AL_{31}	—	January 10, 2008	Calvin-Rehoboth	Calvin College	·	4.1 km	MPC · JPL
212926	2008 AD_{43}	—	January 10, 2008	Catalina	CSS	VER	4.4 km	MPC · JPL
212927	2008 AL_{95}	—	January 14, 2008	Kitt Peak	Spacewatch	THM	3.5 km	MPC · JPL
212928	2008 AK_{106}	—	January 15, 2008	Mount Lemmon	Mount Lemmon Survey	3:2	5.3 km	MPC · JPL
212929 Satovski	2008 AD_{112}	Satovski	January 15, 2008	Zelenchukskaya Stn	Zelenchukskaya Stn	·	4.0 km	MPC · JPL
212930	2008 BX_{6}	—	January 16, 2008	Kitt Peak	Spacewatch	HYG	4.3 km	MPC · JPL
212931	2008 BZ_{10}	—	January 18, 2008	Kitt Peak	Spacewatch	·	4.3 km	MPC · JPL
212932	2008 CS_{204}	—	February 3, 2008	Catalina	CSS	·	6.1 km	MPC · JPL
212933	2008 DQ_{8}	—	February 25, 2008	Mount Lemmon	Mount Lemmon Survey	THM	3.0 km	MPC · JPL
212934	2008 SN_{81}	—	September 23, 2008	Mount Lemmon	Mount Lemmon Survey	(194)	4.6 km	MPC · JPL
212935	2008 UH_{96}	—	October 24, 2008	Socorro	LINEAR	EOS	3.2 km	MPC · JPL
212936	2008 UX_{248}	—	October 26, 2008	Mount Lemmon	Mount Lemmon Survey	·	2.1 km	MPC · JPL
212937	2008 UD_{291}	—	October 28, 2008	Kitt Peak	Spacewatch	·	4.4 km	MPC · JPL
212938	2008 UE_{346}	—	October 31, 2008	Mount Lemmon	Mount Lemmon Survey	·	1.9 km	MPC · JPL
212939	2008 WL_{91}	—	November 23, 2008	Mount Lemmon	Mount Lemmon Survey	·	1.8 km	MPC · JPL
212940	2008 YS_{17}	—	December 21, 2008	Mount Lemmon	Mount Lemmon Survey	·	1.9 km	MPC · JPL
212941	2008 YR_{22}	—	December 21, 2008	Mount Lemmon	Mount Lemmon Survey	MAS	1.1 km	MPC · JPL
212942	2008 YC_{30}	—	December 30, 2008	Mayhill	Lowe, A.	·	1.0 km	MPC · JPL
212943	2008 YX_{39}	—	December 29, 2008	Mount Lemmon	Mount Lemmon Survey	·	1.8 km	MPC · JPL
212944	2008 YE_{51}	—	December 29, 2008	Mount Lemmon	Mount Lemmon Survey	·	3.8 km	MPC · JPL
212945	2008 YS_{65}	—	December 30, 2008	Mount Lemmon	Mount Lemmon Survey	·	3.5 km	MPC · JPL
212946	2008 YU_{145}	—	December 30, 2008	Kitt Peak	Spacewatch	THM	2.7 km	MPC · JPL
212947	2009 AC_{28}	—	January 3, 2009	Kitt Peak	Spacewatch	·	2.5 km	MPC · JPL
212948	2009 BZ_{8}	—	January 17, 2009	Socorro	LINEAR	·	2.6 km	MPC · JPL
212949	2009 BV_{23}	—	January 17, 2009	Kitt Peak	Spacewatch	·	1.1 km	MPC · JPL
212950	2009 BZ_{23}	—	January 17, 2009	Kitt Peak	Spacewatch	EUN	1.4 km	MPC · JPL
212951	2009 BB_{40}	—	January 16, 2009	Kitt Peak	Spacewatch	·	2.0 km	MPC · JPL
212952	2009 BP_{40}	—	January 16, 2009	Kitt Peak	Spacewatch	·	3.2 km	MPC · JPL
212953	2009 BU_{44}	—	January 16, 2009	Kitt Peak	Spacewatch	·	4.5 km	MPC · JPL
212954	2009 BL_{46}	—	January 16, 2009	Kitt Peak	Spacewatch	·	1.7 km	MPC · JPL
212955	2009 BF_{47}	—	January 16, 2009	Kitt Peak	Spacewatch	·	1.6 km	MPC · JPL
212956	2009 BH_{51}	—	January 16, 2009	Kitt Peak	Spacewatch	·	1.6 km	MPC · JPL
212957	2009 BY_{57}	—	January 20, 2009	Kitt Peak	Spacewatch	·	1.7 km	MPC · JPL
212958	2009 BW_{61}	—	January 18, 2009	Mount Lemmon	Mount Lemmon Survey	THM	3.0 km	MPC · JPL
212959	2009 BD_{65}	—	January 20, 2009	Kitt Peak	Spacewatch	·	1.6 km	MPC · JPL
212960	2009 BB_{66}	—	January 20, 2009	Kitt Peak	Spacewatch	·	2.2 km	MPC · JPL
212961	2009 BD_{66}	—	January 20, 2009	Kitt Peak	Spacewatch	AST	3.5 km	MPC · JPL
212962	2009 BV_{72}	—	January 29, 2009	Dauban	Chante-Perdrix	·	850 m	MPC · JPL
212963	2009 BZ_{72}	—	January 29, 2009	Dauban	Chante-Perdrix	·	2.9 km	MPC · JPL
212964	2009 BZ_{75}	—	January 25, 2009	Kitt Peak	Spacewatch	·	1.5 km	MPC · JPL
212965	2009 BV_{87}	—	January 25, 2009	Kitt Peak	Spacewatch	·	3.0 km	MPC · JPL
212966	2009 BF_{102}	—	January 29, 2009	Mount Lemmon	Mount Lemmon Survey	·	2.2 km	MPC · JPL
212967	2009 BK_{102}	—	January 29, 2009	Catalina	CSS	·	4.9 km	MPC · JPL
212968	2009 BH_{104}	—	January 25, 2009	Kitt Peak	Spacewatch	NYS	1.6 km	MPC · JPL
212969	2009 BK_{107}	—	January 29, 2009	Kitt Peak	Spacewatch	MAS	1.1 km	MPC · JPL
212970	2009 BY_{109}	—	January 30, 2009	Mount Lemmon	Mount Lemmon Survey	·	920 m	MPC · JPL
212971	2009 BA_{121}	—	January 31, 2009	Kitt Peak	Spacewatch	·	2.1 km	MPC · JPL
212972	2009 BQ_{123}	—	January 31, 2009	Kitt Peak	Spacewatch	·	3.2 km	MPC · JPL
212973	2009 BN_{146}	—	January 30, 2009	Mount Lemmon	Mount Lemmon Survey	·	980 m	MPC · JPL
212974	2009 BQ_{155}	—	January 31, 2009	Kitt Peak	Spacewatch	·	3.2 km	MPC · JPL
212975	2009 BJ_{156}	—	January 31, 2009	Kitt Peak	Spacewatch	V	750 m	MPC · JPL
212976	2009 BK_{167}	—	January 24, 2009	Cerro Burek	Burek, Cerro	·	900 m	MPC · JPL
212977 Birutė	2009 CT_{3}	Birutė	February 2, 2009	Moletai	K. Černis	·	1.5 km	MPC · JPL
212978	2009 CT_{25}	—	February 1, 2009	Kitt Peak	Spacewatch	·	2.7 km	MPC · JPL
212979	2009 CN_{34}	—	February 2, 2009	Kitt Peak	Spacewatch	AGN	1.3 km	MPC · JPL
212980	2009 CW_{37}	—	February 14, 2009	Bisei SG Center	BATTeRS	·	3.0 km	MPC · JPL
212981 Majalitović	2009 CH_{51}	Majalitović	February 14, 2009	La Sagra	OAM	·	700 m	MPC · JPL
212982	2009 CC_{52}	—	February 14, 2009	Mount Lemmon	Mount Lemmon Survey	MAS	930 m	MPC · JPL
212983	2009 CW_{52}	—	February 14, 2009	Mount Lemmon	Mount Lemmon Survey	·	950 m	MPC · JPL
212984	2009 DC	—	February 17, 2009	Mayhill	Lowe, A.	·	2.1 km	MPC · JPL
212985	2009 DZ_{5}	—	February 16, 2009	Kitt Peak	Spacewatch	EOS	3.7 km	MPC · JPL
212986	2009 DG_{14}	—	February 19, 2009	Catalina	CSS	NYS	1.7 km	MPC · JPL
212987	2009 DO_{16}	—	February 17, 2009	La Sagra	OAM	·	2.7 km	MPC · JPL
212988	2009 DA_{18}	—	February 19, 2009	Kitt Peak	Spacewatch	·	2.3 km	MPC · JPL
212989	2009 DZ_{22}	—	February 19, 2009	Kitt Peak	Spacewatch	·	1.6 km	MPC · JPL
212990	2009 DT_{24}	—	February 21, 2009	Kitt Peak	Spacewatch	KOR	2.2 km	MPC · JPL
212991 Garcíalorca	2009 DE_{30}	Garcíalorca	February 23, 2009	Calar Alto	F. Hormuth	·	1.1 km	MPC · JPL
212992	2009 DW_{56}	—	February 22, 2009	Kitt Peak	Spacewatch	·	2.3 km	MPC · JPL
212993	2132 P-L	—	September 24, 1960	Palomar	C. J. van Houten, I. van Houten-Groeneveld, T. Gehrels	·	4.8 km	MPC · JPL
212994	6598 P-L	—	September 24, 1960	Palomar	C. J. van Houten, I. van Houten-Groeneveld, T. Gehrels	·	3.7 km	MPC · JPL
212995	1230 T-2	—	September 29, 1973	Palomar	C. J. van Houten, I. van Houten-Groeneveld, T. Gehrels	·	920 m	MPC · JPL
212996	3226 T-2	—	September 30, 1973	Palomar	C. J. van Houten, I. van Houten-Groeneveld, T. Gehrels	NYS	1.8 km	MPC · JPL
212997	3238 T-2	—	September 30, 1973	Palomar	C. J. van Houten, I. van Houten-Groeneveld, T. Gehrels	·	6.2 km	MPC · JPL
212998 Tolbachik	3931 T-3	Tolbachik	October 16, 1977	Palomar	C. J. van Houten, I. van Houten-Groeneveld, T. Gehrels	H	970 m	MPC · JPL
212999	4330 T-3	—	October 16, 1977	Palomar	C. J. van Houten, I. van Houten-Groeneveld, T. Gehrels	HYG	4.2 km	MPC · JPL
213000	1981 ET_{2}	—	March 2, 1981	Siding Spring	S. J. Bus	LIX	5.0 km	MPC · JPL

back to top

== See also ==
- Meanings of minor-planet names: 212001–213000
