= Kuangbiao-1 =

1972 Chinese atmospheric nuclear test

- Display weapon
- Type: Nuclear weapon

Service history
- Used by: People's Liberation Army Air Force

Production history
- Designer: Ninth Institute of the Second Ministry of Machine Building
- Designed: 1970
- Developed from: Project 639

Specifications
- Mass: 1000 kg
- Length: 2 m (6 ft 7 in)
- Detonation mechanism: Airburst
- Blast yield: 8 kilotons of TNT (33 TJ)

Kuangbiao-1

Information
- Country: China
- Test site: Lop Nur Test Base
- Date: 7 January 1972
- Test type: Atmospheric
- Device type: Pure fission weapon; composite HEU and plutonium pit
- Yield: 8 kilotons of TNT (33 TJ)

Test chronology

The Kuangbiao-1 (Chinese: 狂飙一号; pinyin: Kuángbiāo yīhào, meaning "Hurricane-1") was a tactical nuclear gravity bomb of the People's Liberation Army Air Force.

Following the high tensions of the 1969 Sino-Soviet border conflict, over 9,000 of the 14,000 Soviet tanks were deployed to the border. The weapon was developed with the specific objective of destroying Soviet armored division columns.

Unlike previous Chinese nuclear weapons, it was miniaturized, allowing it to be carried by a supersonic fighter rather than subsonic Xi'an H-6 and Harbin H-5 bombers. It was designed to be carried by the Nanchang Q-5, in a "semi-buried" fashion beneath the airframe.

The bomb was tested, dropped from a Q-5 jet, in the 13th Chinese nuclear test, on 7 January 1972. The test originally was intended for 30 December 1971, but a release mechanism failure forced the jet to return and land at Lop Nur, with at least three of its five safeties off. This triggered the evacuation to bomb shelters of all 10,000 personnel at the base. The successful test yield was estimated at 8 to 20 kilotons of TNT.

According to academic Hui Zhang, there is circumstantial evidence the pure fission device used a composite core, with a central plutonium sphere surrounded by a highly enriched uranium shell. The weapon is frequently erroneously cited as a hydrogen bomb. Its early designation during development was "Small Detonator Bomb for Hydrogen Bomb" (小型氢弹引爆弹), meaning it was an atomic bomb, intended as the miniaturized nuclear primary for subsequent hydrogen bombs, specifically the first version of the 515 warhead, used atop the JL-1 submarine launched ballistic missile.

== See also ==
- Project 596
- Two Bombs, One Satellite
- Yu Min (physicist)
