= Operation 21-716 =

Chinese nuclear weapons test in 1980

21-716
- The mushroom cloud over Lop Nur following the test

Information
- Country: China
- Test site: Lop Nur Test Base
- Period: 16 October 1980
- Number of tests: 1
- Agency: Second Ministry of Machine Building
- Test type: Atmospheric
- Device type: Two-stage thermonuclear bomb
- Explosive: "515" warhead
- Max. yield: 700 kilotons of TNT (2,900 TJ)

Test chronology

Operation 21-716 (CIA designation: CHIC-27) was a atmospheric nuclear weapon test conducted by the nuclear weapons program of China on 16 October 1980, at Lop Nur Nuclear Test Base in Xinjiang, and is the world's most recent atmospheric nuclear explosion. Yielding approximately 700 kilotons, it was a test of the thermonuclear warhead design codenamed "515", which tipped the DF-21 intermediate-range ballistic missile and JL-1 submarine-launched ballistic missile. The design utilized a boosted nuclear primary containing solid lithium deuteride-tritide. Western estimates of the yield varied from 200 kilotons to 1 megaton.

== Name ==
The test was the 27th nuclear weapons tests by China, and the 16th that was an airburst. The Second Ministry of Machine Building codenamed all nuclear tests beginning "21-", and all airburst nuclear tests as "21-7x", hence 21-716. The Central Intelligence Agency designated Chinese nuclear tests as CHIC-x, sequentially, short for CHICOM, a US shortening of "Chinese Communist" during the Cold War.

== Warhead design ==
The 515 warhead was a new variant testing a boosted design. Solid lithium deuteride-tritide (a mixture of LiD and LiT) was used within the plutonium fission primary to boost its yield, and thus the energy delivered to compress the thermonuclear secondary. Previous Chinese thermonuclear secondaries were spherical, with an natural uranium tamper and lithium deuteride core. China did not start testing nuclear sparkplugs or highly enriched uranium tampers until its June 1987, with its thirty-third nuclear test, Operation 21-85 (CHIC-33), an underground test yielding approximately 250 kilotons.

This new 515 warhead variant was intended to tip the DF-21 intermediate-range ballistic missile and JL-1 submarine-launched ballistic missile. According to academic Hui Zhang, there is circumstantial evidence that the previous 515 warhead variant used a pure fission primary with a composite core, with a central plutonium sphere surrounded by a highly enriched uranium shell. This nuclear primary was tested in China's 13th nuclear test in 1972 and deployed as the Kuangbiao-1 gravity bomb.

== Testing ==
A prior full-yield 515 test attempt, 21-715, failed on 13 September 1979 when the bomb's parachute did not open and it crashed into the desert six kilometers away from the intended airburst center. As head of the program, Deng Jiaxian went to the accident site investigate in an effort to show his responsibility, despite his colleague's attempt to dissuade him from doing so. The dispersed plutonium contaminated Deng heavily and may have contributed to the development of rectal cancer, which caused his death on 29 July 1986.

On 16 October 1980, dropped from a Xi'an H-6 bomber and falling to a height of 1 to 2 km, the 515 warhead exploded yielding approximately 700 kilotons.

== International context ==
Prior to the test, the nuclear programs of the United States, Soviet Union, and United Kingdom had abandoned atmospheric nuclear testing under the 1963 Partial Nuclear Test Ban Treaty. China had conducted the majority of its nuclear program in defiance of this initiative, but recognized international pressure, and had conducted four underground nuclear tests between 1969 and 1978. France, facing similar pressure due to its nuclear testing in French Polynesia, including an International Court of Justice lawsuit by Australia and New Zealand, ceased atmospheric testing in 1974. The 1979 Vela incident was an atmospheric nuclear explosion widely believed to have been a test of an Israeli nuclear weapon.

The international reaction was mild. French president Valéry Giscard d'Estaing, visiting China at the time, claimed to be in agreement with Chinese officials that the United States and Soviet Union should not have a nuclear monopoly. US officials considered the test would mostly affect the Soviet Union, and announced that the nuclear fallout reaching the US Pacific coast on 20 October was of little danger.

== Aborted 1985 atmospheric test ==
Following 21-716, China begun development of a second-generation thermonuclear warhead, codenamed "535", which would tip the DF-31 and probably the multiple independently targetable reentry vehicles of the modernized DF-5B. This used a deuterium-tritium gas-boosted nuclear primary with improved explosive lenses, and potentially nuclear sparkplugs and highly enriched uranium tampers for its secondary. Following underground tests of the primary, workers at Lop Nur completed preparations for a full-yield atmospheric test of the warhead in November 1985, but this was cancelled at the last minute for political reasons. Premier Zhao Ziyang, in New York City at the time for the fortieth anniversary of the founding of the United Nations, did not want to face political pressure for an atmospheric test. China had also begun a national "military-to-civilian conversion" in the 1980s as part of reform and opening up. Lastly, the specialized steel alloy necessary to prevent hydrogen isotope gas leakage from the primary would not be available for weapon production for a few years.

On 21 March 1986, Zhao announced that China would not conduct further atmospheric nuclear tests. The 535 warhead was tested in June 1987 as Operation 21-85 (CHIC-33), an underground test yielding approximately 250 kilotons.

== See also ==
- Operation Fishbowl - Last US atmospheric test series
- 1962 Soviet nuclear tests - Last Soviet atmospheric test series
- Operation Grapple - Last British atmospheric test series
- 1971–74 French nuclear tests - Last French atmospheric test series
