= China Academy of Engineering Physics =

Chinese nuclear weapons research institute

- 中国工程物理研究院
- Formation: October 1958; 68 years ago
- Fields: nuclear weapons
- Website: www.caep.ac.cn
- Formerly called: Ninth Academy of the Second Ministry of Machine Building

China Academy of Engineering Physics, formerly known as Ninth Institute, was founded in October 1958. The CAEP is the main and only organization responsible for advancing the Chinese nuclear weapons program by researching and developing fissile materials as well as testing of Chinese nuclear weapons.

== History ==
The Chinese Communist Party established the Ninth Institute (or Ninth Bureau) for developing the for nuclear weapoons in October 1958. The Ninth Bureau was attached to the Second Ministry of Machine Industry in November 1958. The research group was initially located in Beijing but the major components of its nuclear program were relocated to Qinghai Province in the 1950s. After China's first nuclear test in 1964, the institute and its activities (nuclear weapons research, development, and production) were moved to Sichuan Province to avoid detection by foreign powers. It was renamed the China Academy of Engineering Physics (CAEP) in the 1980s.

== Organization ==
The CAEP headquarters, since the 1980s, is in the 839 area of Mianyang and covers a land area of 5 km^{2}. It is also nicknamed Scientific Town. It has multiple outlets located in Beijing, Jiangyou, Mianyang, Chengdu, and Shanghai.

Since the 1990s, the CAEP has included 12 research institutes and 15 national key laboratories. Its research areas include theoretical physics, plasma physics, engineering and material sciences, electronics and photo-electronics, materials chemistry and chemical engineering, computer science, and computational mathematics. Most of the names of the research organizations in the Mianyang area include "Southwest Institute" in their titles because they are located in the southwest part of China.

In 1998, CAEP was placed within the purview of the General Armament Department of the People's Liberation Army.

As of 2017, the CAEP staff has included as many as 23,000 scientists, engineers, mathematicians, and technicians.

=== U.S. sanctions ===
Due to its collaboration with KRL of Pakistan, the CAEP and some of its related institutes and companies has been on the United States Department of Commerce's Entity List since 1997.

== CAEP Institutes ==
The institutes of the CAEP include:

- Graduate School, Beijing
- Southwest Computer Center
- Institute of Applied Physics and Computational Mathematics, Beijing
- Southwest Institute of Chemical Materials, China
- Southwest Institute of Environmental Testing
- Southwest Institute of Electronic Engineering
- Southwest Institute of Explosives and Chemical Engineering
- Southwest Institute of Fluid Physics, China
- Southwest Institute of Environmental Testing
- Southwest Institute of Nuclear Physics and Chemistry, Mianyang 621900, Sichuan Province
- Southwest Institute of Structural Mechanics, Mianyang 621900, Sichuan Province
- Institute of Systems Engineering, Mianyang 6219000, Sichuan Province
- Terahertz Research Center, Mianyang, Sichuan Province
- Research Center of Laser Fusion, Mianyang, Sichuan Province

== Notable persons related to CAEP and China's nuclear weapons program ==
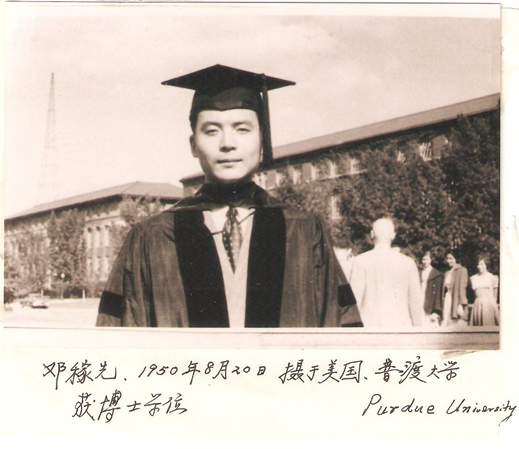
Deng Jiaxian (1924–1986) upon Graduation from Purdue University in 1950.

- Wang Ganchang (1907–1998), vice director of the Ninth Academy
- Zhu Guangya (1924–2011), first director of the CAEP in 1994
- Zhou Guangzhao (1929–2024), director of the nuclear weapons institute
- Peng Huanwu (1915–2007), led the development of the first fission and thermonuclear weapons
- Deng Jiaxian (1924–1986), considered the father of China's nuclear weapons program
- Cheng Kaijia (1918–2019), nuclear weapons designer and director of the Lop Nur test site
- Yu Min (1926–2019), nuclear weapons designer
- Chen Nengkuan (1923–2016), key contributor to the nuclear weapons program
- Guo Yonghuai (1909–1968), vice director of the Ninth Institute in 1960

The CAEP has included as many as 14 academicians of the Chinese Academy of Sciences (CAS) and 15 academicians of the Chinese Academy of Engineering (CAE), as well as many other outstanding Chinese scientists and engineers.

== See also ==
- Mianyang Hi-Tech Industrial Development Zone
- China and weapons of mass destruction
- List of nuclear weapons tests of China
- Lop Nur Nuclear Weapons Test Base
