= Li Jue (Chinese general) =

Chinese general

Li Jue (Chinese: 李觉, February 1914 – February 12, 2010), a native of Yishui, Shandong, was a major general of the People's Republic of China.

== Biography ==
From 1933 to 1936, Li Jue studied at Hongda College in Beiping and China University in Beiping, and from March to September 1936, he studied at the Northeast Army Cavalry Group School in Xifeng, Gansu, and in 1937, he joined the Red Army and served as a deputy platoon leader of Company 1 of the 7th Regiment of the 3rd Division of the Cavalry of the Northeast Army, as well as an instructor of the 3rd Regiment of the Infantry School of the Red Army, and in September 1937, he joined the Chinese Communist Party. During the Second Sino-Japanese War, he served as a cultural instructor in the school accompanying the headquarters of the Eighth Route Army, a staff member in the school accompanying the headquarters in Xiaoyi County, Shanxi, a political instructor in the 11th Shanxi Death Squad, a secretary of the Party branch of the 3rd brigade of the Jinsi Detachment, a political instructor in the 3rd battalion of the 2nd regiment of the Jinsi Detachment, a deputy director of the political office of the 7th regiment of the 3rd Brigade of the Ruxi Military Region, a head of the operations unit and a head of the staff office of the 8th military sub-district of the Ji-Lu-Yu Military Region.

During the Second Kuomintang-Communist Civil War, he served as Chief of Staff of the First Brigade of the First Column of the Jin-Ji-Lu-Yu Military Region (Chinese: 晋冀鲁豫军区, Chief of Staff of the First Column, Deputy Brigade Commander of the 20th Brigade of the First Column of the Second Field Army, Commander of the Forty-Seventh Division of the Sixteenth Army of the Second Field Army, and Chief of the Operations Division of the Command of the Second Field Army.

After the founding of the People's Republic of China, he served as the second chief of staff of the 18th Army of the Fifth Corps of the Second Field Army, deputy commander and head of the logistics department, deputy commander and chief of staff. in March 1950, he assisted in the command of the Battle of Chamdo. 1955, he was conferred the rank of major general. After 1957, he served as the director of the Ninth Bureau of the Second Ministry of Machine Industry of the People's Republic of China, and the director of the Institute of Nuclear Weapons Research (Chinese: 核武器研究院). 1965, he was appointed deputy minister of Ministry of Nuclear Industry. In May 1982, he became a consultant of the Ministry of Nuclear Industry, and in April 1997, he retired.

He was also a member of the 4th, 5th, 6th National Committees of the Chinese People's Political Consultative Conference, and in 2005, he was awarded the Medal of Commemoration for the 60th Anniversary of the Victory of the Chinese People's War of Resistance Against Japanese Aggression by the Central Committee of the Chinese Communist Party, the State Council, and the Central Military Commission, and he died on February 12, 2010, at the age of 96 in Beijing.
