= Li Jue =

Li Jue may refer to:

- Li Jue (Han dynasty) (李傕; died 198), general of the Han dynasty
- Li Jue (Tang dynasty) (李珏; c. 784–852), chancellor of the Tang dynasty
- Li Jue (1900) (Chinese: 李覺; 1900–1987), Commander of the 70th Army of the National Revolutionary Army
- Li Jue (1914), (Chinese: 李觉; 1914 - February 12, 2010), a native of Yishui, Shandong, was a general of the People's Liberation Army (PLA).
