= Qian Ji =

Chinese physicist and aerospace engineer

Qian Ji (Chinese: 钱骥; 27 December 1917 – 28 August 1983) was a Chinese physicist and aerospace engineer who was instrumental in the development of China's first satellite, the Dong Fang Hong I, and its first successful 3-in-1 satellite launch, the Shijian 2. In 1999, he was posthumously awarded the Two Bombs, One Satellite Meritorious Medal.

== Early life and career ==
Qian was born on 27 December 1917 in Jintan, Jiangsu, Republic of China. He studied at Wuxi Normal School (无锡师范学校) from 1935 until October 1937, when the school was destroyed by Japanese aerial bombing after the outbreak of the Second Sino-Japanese War. As Jiangsu fell to Japanese occupation, Qian fled to Sichuan province, the centre of Kuomintang resistance during the war.

Qian graduated from National Sichuan High School in Beibei in 1938, and tested into National Central University, then exiled in Chongqing. Upon graduation in 1943, he was hired by the university as an assistant professor.

After the surrender of Japan, Qian was transferred in 1947 to the Institute of Meteorology of Academia Sinica in Nanjing, working as an assistant researcher under the renowned scientist Zhao Jiuzhang. When the Kuomintang lost the Chinese Civil War to the Communist Party and retreated to Taiwan, Zhao and Qian both chose to stay in mainland China.

== Satellite design ==
After the founding of the People's Republic of China in 1949, Qian and Zhao worked for the Institute of Geophysics of the Chinese Academy of Sciences, which was relocated to Beijing in 1954. Following the launch of the Sputnik 1, Qian visited the Soviet Union in October 1958 with a delegation of the Chinese Academy of Sciences. After returning from the trip, he began to focus on basic research to lay the foundation for China's own artificial satellite.

After more than five years of work, Zhao Jiuzhang and Qian Ji felt that the necessary preparations had been in place, and Qian wrote a detailed proposal for China's satellite project in 1965. The proposal was adopted by the Chinese government, and the Dongfanghong program started in September 1965. Zhao was appointed the head of the newly established Satellite Design Institute under the Chinese Academy of Sciences, and Qian the technical director.

Soon afterwards, the Cultural Revolution erupted in 1966 and China fell into chaos. Zhao and Qian, as leaders of the Satellite Design Institute, were targeted by the rebel faction of the Red Guards and came under severe persecution. When Zhao committed suicide in 1968, the national government was alarmed and Premier Zhou Enlai personally intervened to restore order at the institute. Qian resumed his work and on 24 April 1970, China's first satellite, the Dong Fang Hong I, was successfully launched.

In 1974, Qian was appointed design director of the Beijing Institute of Spacecraft Systems Engineering. There he led the design of the Shijian 2 satellite, which was successfully launched in 1981. The Shijian 2 was China's first successful 3-in-1 satellite launch and its first satellite with a complete solar orientation system for maximizing solar power. It marked a significant advance in satellite technology.

== Death and honours ==
On 28 August 1983, Qian died of cancer at the age of 65. In 1986, he was posthumously awarded the Special Prize of the State Science and Technology Progress Award. In 1999, he was awarded the Two Bombs, One Satellite Meritorious Medal.
