= Two Bombs, One Satellite =

Nuclear and aerospace projects of the People's Republic of China

Two Bombs, One Satellite (Chinese: 两弹一星; pinyin: liǎng dàn, yī xīng) is a retronym for the early nuclear weapon, ballistic missile, and artificial satellite development of the People's Republic of China, coined by the Chinese government in 1999.

China's nuclear weapons program detonated its first fission and first thermonuclear weapons in 1964 and 1967 respectively, and combined a nuclear weapon with a surface-to-surface missile in 1966. China's space program successfully launched its first satellite in 1970.

== History ==
=== Proposal ===
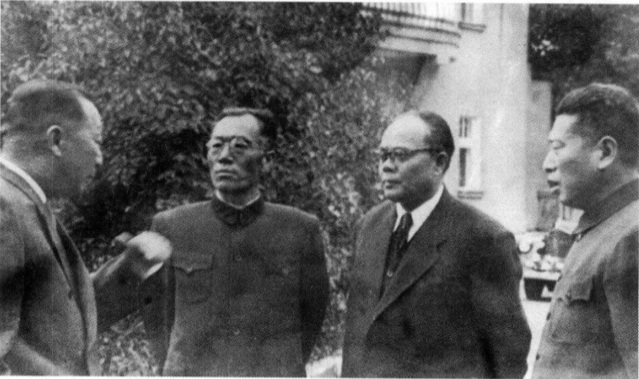
Nie Rongzhen (left) with Chinese officials in Moscow (1957).

In the 1940s and 1950s, a group of notable scientists including Qian Weichang, Qian Xuesen, Deng Jiaxian, Peng Huanwu and Qian Sanqiang returned to mainland China.

United States President Dwight D. Eisenhower's threats during the First Taiwan Strait Crisis to use nuclear weapons against military targets in Fujian province prompted Mao to begin China's nuclear program. In January 1955, Mao Zedong expressed the intention of developing atomic bombs during a meeting of the Secretariat of the Chinese Communist Party.

In 1956, hundreds of experts were called by Zhou Enlai, Chen Yi, Li Fuchun and Nie Rongzhen to make plans for China's scientific development, eventually creating an outline of development for the period from 1956 to 1967 (1956-1967年科学技术发展远景规划纲要).

In 1958, Mao formally announced the plan to develop nuclear bombs, missiles and satellites.

=== Soviet aid, its termination, and uranium enrichment ===
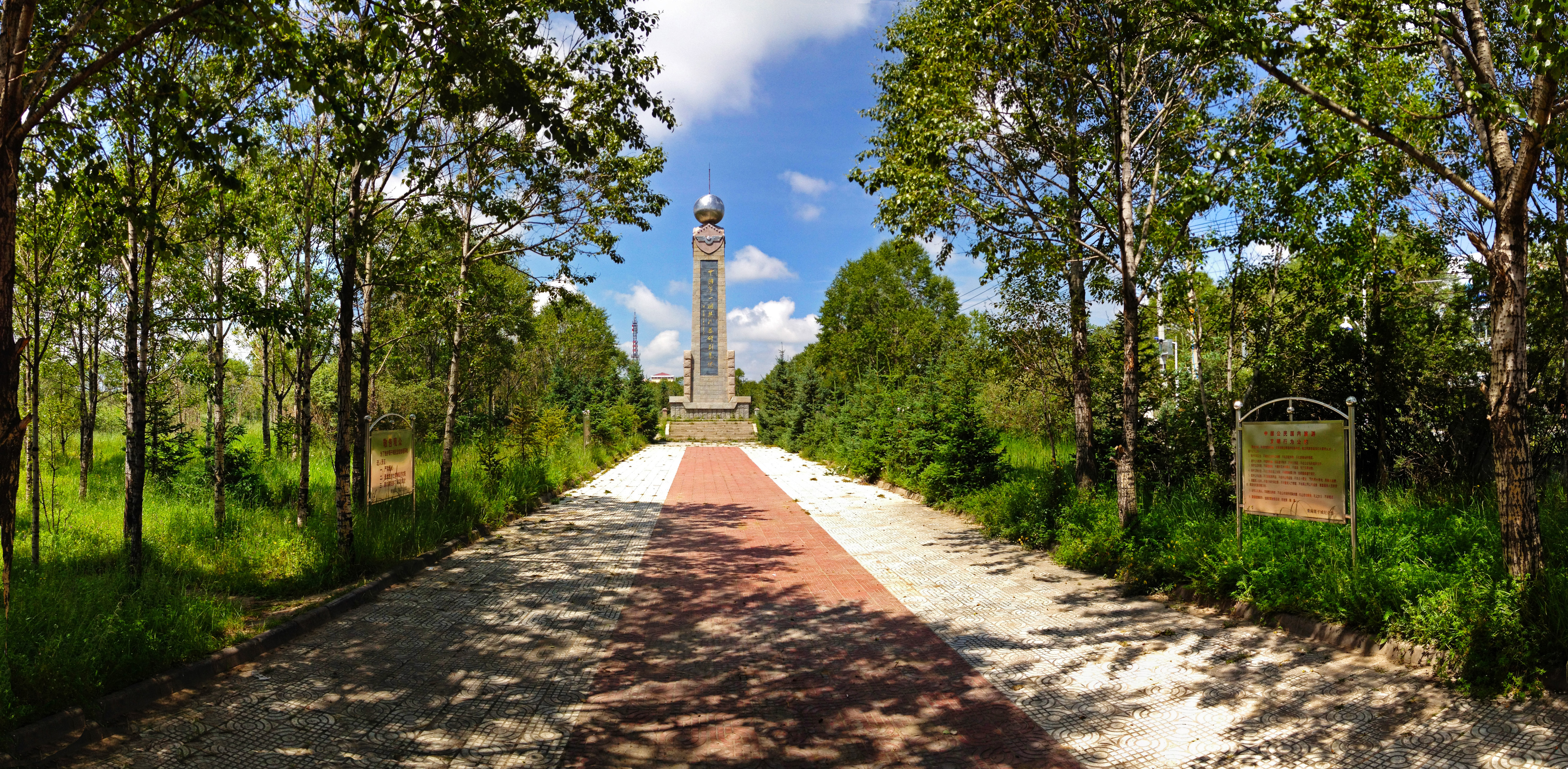
The monument of the successful atomic detonation in Qinghai.

At the same time, the Soviet Union had provided China with important assistance since 1955, even though on December 10, 1957, the Soviet Union proposed that the United States, the United Kingdom, and the USSR should halt nuclear weapons tests for the next two to three years, to which China supported.

In 1956, the Third Ministry of Machinery Building was established, and nuclear research was conducted at the Institute of Physics and Atomic Energy in Beijing. In 1957, China and the USSR signed an agreement on sharing defense technology that involved a prototype boosted fission weapon being supplied by Moscow to Beijing, technical data, and an exchange of hundreds of Russian and Chinese scientists. A joint search for uranium in China was conducted between the two countries. A location near Lake Lop Nur in Xinjiang was selected to be the test site with its headquarters at Malan. Construction of the test site began on April 1, 1960, involving tens of thousands of laborers and prisoners under tough conditions. It took four years to complete. Being the sole site for nuclear testing in China for years to come, the Lop Nur test site underwent extensive expansion and is by far the world's largest nuclear weapons test site, covering around 100,000 square kilometers. From 1958, the Lanzhou uranium enrichment plant was constructed with gaseous diffusion technology.

Sino-Soviet relations worsened in the late 1950s. The Soviet Union withdrew the delivery of a prototype bomb and over 1,400 Russian advisers and technicians involved in 200 scientific projects in China meant to foster cooperation between the two countries.

After Nikita Khrushchev decided to stop helping the Chinese with their nuclear program on June 20, 1959, Mao shifted toward an overall policy of self-reliance. Project 596, named after the month of June 1959, was initiated as an independent nuclear project. The Second Ministry of Machine Building Industry, which oversaw China's nuclear industry, continued with the development of an atomic bomb. By January 14, 1964, enough fissionable U-235 had been successfully enriched from the Lanzhou plant. On October 16, 1964, a uranium-235 fission implosion device, weighing 1550 kilograms was detonated on a 102-meter tower.

In 1961–62, there was a disagreement among senior officials of the Chinese Communist Party and the Chinese government on whether China should continue with the "Two Bombs, One Satellite" project. Eventually, in November 1962, a central committee led by Zhou Enlai, Nie Rongzhen and others was established, and the project was carried on.

=== Cultural Revolution ===
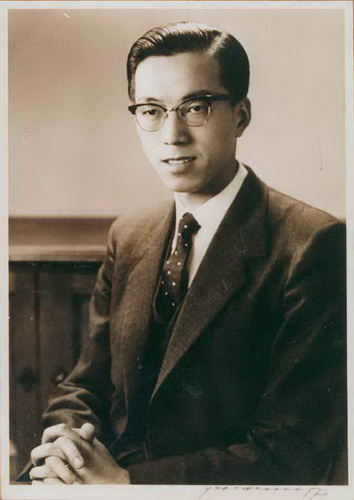
Yao Tongbin was a leading missile expert of the "Two Bombs, One Satellite" program. He was beaten to death in 1968 during the Cultural Revolution, among many others who were persecuted.

In 1966, Mao launched the Cultural Revolution. Academics and intellectuals were regarded as Stinking Old Ninth and were widely persecuted. In 1968, among the leading scientists who worked on the "Two Bombs, One Satellite" program, Yao Tongbin a member of the 916 "rebel" faction was beaten to death by "conservative" Red Guards, Zhao Jiuzhang committed suicide, and Guo Yonghuai died in a plane crash. By September 1971, more than 4,000 staff members of China's nuclear center in Qinghai were persecuted. More than 310 of them were permanently disabled, over 40 people committed suicide, and five were executed. Many researchers with overseas education background (especially from the United States and the United Kingdom) were regarded as "spies". Only a few scientists including Qian Xuesen were protected in the Revolution because of a special list made by Premier Zhou Enlai (approved by Mao) in August 1966.

=== Timeline of milestones ===
- On October 16, 1964, Project 596 detonated China's first atomic bomb in Lop Nur, making China the fifth country in the world to possess nuclear weapons.
- On October 27, 1966, China's first surface-to-surface missile (Dongfeng-2) carrying nuclear bomb was successfully launched and detonated.
- On June 17, 1967, Test No. 6 successfully detonated China's first hydrogen bomb in Lop Nur.
- On September 22, 1969, China's first underground nuclear test was successfully detonated in Lop Nur.
- On April 24, 1970, China's first satellite (Dong Fang Hong I) was successfully launched into space, making China the fifth nation to put a spacecraft into orbit using its own rocket.

=== Fissile material production ===
Plutonium production reactors
Reactor location	Name	Began operation	Shut down	Design power	Upgraded power	Total energy	Total weapons-grade plutonium produced	Design
Jiuquan, Gansu	Plant 404	October 1966	1984	250 MWth	300 MWth	1050 GWth-days	0.9 tons	Graphite-moderated, water-cooled
Guangyuan, Sichuan	Plant 821	December 1973	1989?	250 MWth	325 MWth	1300 GWth-days	1.1 tons	Graphite-moderated, water-cooled

Highly enriched uranium production plants
Plant location	Name	Began operation	Ended HEU production	Initial output	Upgraded output	Total SWU	Total HEU produced	Design
Lanzhou, Gansu	Plant 504	1964	1979	20,000 SWU/yr	180,000 SWU/yr	1.1 million SWU	6 tons	Gaseous diffusion
Heping, Jinkouhe, Sichuan	Plant 814	1975	1987	100,000 SWU/yr	230,000 SWU/yr	2.7 million SWU	14 tons	Gaseous diffusion

== Aftermath and memorial ==
Ultimately, China developed the atomic and hydrogen bombs in record time.

After the Cultural Revolution, Deng Xiaoping became the new paramount leader of China and started the Boluan Fanzheng program. Scientists and intellectuals were rehabilitated and, in particular, Yao Tongbin was honored as a martyr. Deng emphasized that knowledge and talented people must be respected, and the wrong thought of disrespecting intellectuals must be opposed.

In 1986, four leading scientists who had worked on the Two Bombs, One Satellite program proposed to Deng that China must stimulate the development of advanced technologies. Upon Deng's approval, the 863 Program was launched. Inspecting the Beijing Electron–Positron Collider in 1988, Deng remarked "If it were not for the atomic bomb, the hydrogen bomb and the satellites we have launched since the 1960s, China would not have its present international standing as a great, influential country."

In 1999, twenty-three scientists who had made significant contributions in the "Two Bombs, One Satellite" program were awarded the Two Bombs and One Satellite Merit Award (Chinese: 两弹一星功勋奖章; pinyin: Liǎng dàn yì xīng gōngxūn jiǎngzhāng). In 2015, the "Two Bombs, One Satellite Memorial Museum" was opened on the Huairou campus of the University of the Chinese Academy of Sciences.

List of Two Bombs, One Satellite Meritorious Medal recipients
Awardee	Field	Contribution	Alma mater
Chen Fangyun (1916–2000)	Radio electronics	Satellite	National Southwestern Associated University
Chen Nengkuan (1923–2016)	Metal physics Detonation physics	Atomic bomb and hydrogen bomb	National Tangshan Engineering College; Yale University
Cheng Kaijia (1918–2018)	Nuclear physics	Atomic bomb and hydrogen bomb	Zhejiang University; University of Edinburgh
Deng Jiaxian (1924–1986)	Nuclear physics	Atomic bomb and hydrogen bomb	National Southwestern Associated University; Purdue University
Guo Yonghuai (1909–1968)	Aerodynamics	Atomic bomb, hydrogen bomb and missile	Peking University; University of Toronto; California Institute of Technology
Huang Weilu (1916–2011)	Engineering cybernetics	Missile	National Central University; Imperial College London
Peng Huanwu (1915–2007)	Theoretical physics	Atomic bomb and hydrogen bomb	Tsinghua University; University of Edinburgh
Qian Ji (1917–1983)	Space physics	Satellite	National Central University
Qian Sanqiang (1913–1992)	Nuclear physics	Atomic bomb and hydrogen bomb	Tsinghua University; University of Paris; Collège de France
Qian Xuesen (1911–2009)	Aeronautics; Engineering cybernetics	Rocket, missile and satellite	National Chiao Tung University; Massachusetts Institute of Technology; California Institute of Technology
Ren Xinmin (1915–2017)	Aeronautics	Rocket, missile and satellite	National Central University; Chongqing Ordnance School affiliated to Military Ministry; University of Michigan
Sun Jiadong (1929–)	Aeronautics	Missile and satellite	Harbin Institute of Technology; Zhukovsky Air Force Academy
Tu Shou'e (1917–2012)	Aeronautics	Missile and rocket	National Southwestern Associated University; Massachusetts Institute of Technology
Wang Daheng (1915–2011)	Optics	Atomic bomb and satellite	Tsinghua University; Imperial College London; University of Sheffield
Wang Ganchang (1907–1998)	Nuclear physics	Atomic bomb and hydrogen bomb	Tsinghua University; University of Berlin
Wang Xiji (1921–2026)	Space technology	Rocket and satellite	National Southwestern Associated University; Virginia Polytechnic Institute and State University
Wu Ziliang (1917–2008)	Chemical metallurgy	Atomic bomb	National Northwestern Engineering Institute; Carnegie Institute of Technology
Yang Jiachi (1919–2006)	Automation	Satellite	National Chiao Tung University; Harvard University
Yao Tongbin (1922–1968)	Aerospace materials and technology	Missile and rocket	National Tangshan Engineering College; University of Birmingham
Yu Min (1926–2019)	Nuclear physics	Hydrogen bomb	Peking University
Zhao Jiuzhang (1907–1968)	Meteorology; Geophysics	Satellite	Tsinghua University; University of Berlin
Zhou Guangzhao (1929–2024)	Theoretical physics	Atomic bomb and hydrogen bomb	Tsinghua University; Peking University
Zhu Guangya (1924–2011)	Nuclear physics	Atomic bomb and hydrogen bomb	National Southwestern Associated University; University of Michigan

== See also ==
- 863 Program – Chinese technology program
- Chang'e 3 – Chinese lunar lander and rover (2013–Present)
- China and weapons of mass destruction
- Chinese space program
- List of nuclear weapons tests of China
- Shenzhou 5 – 2003 first human spaceflight mission of China
- Tiangong-1 – Chinese space station (2011–2018)
