= A List of Cadres to Be Protected =

Document written by Zhou Enlai

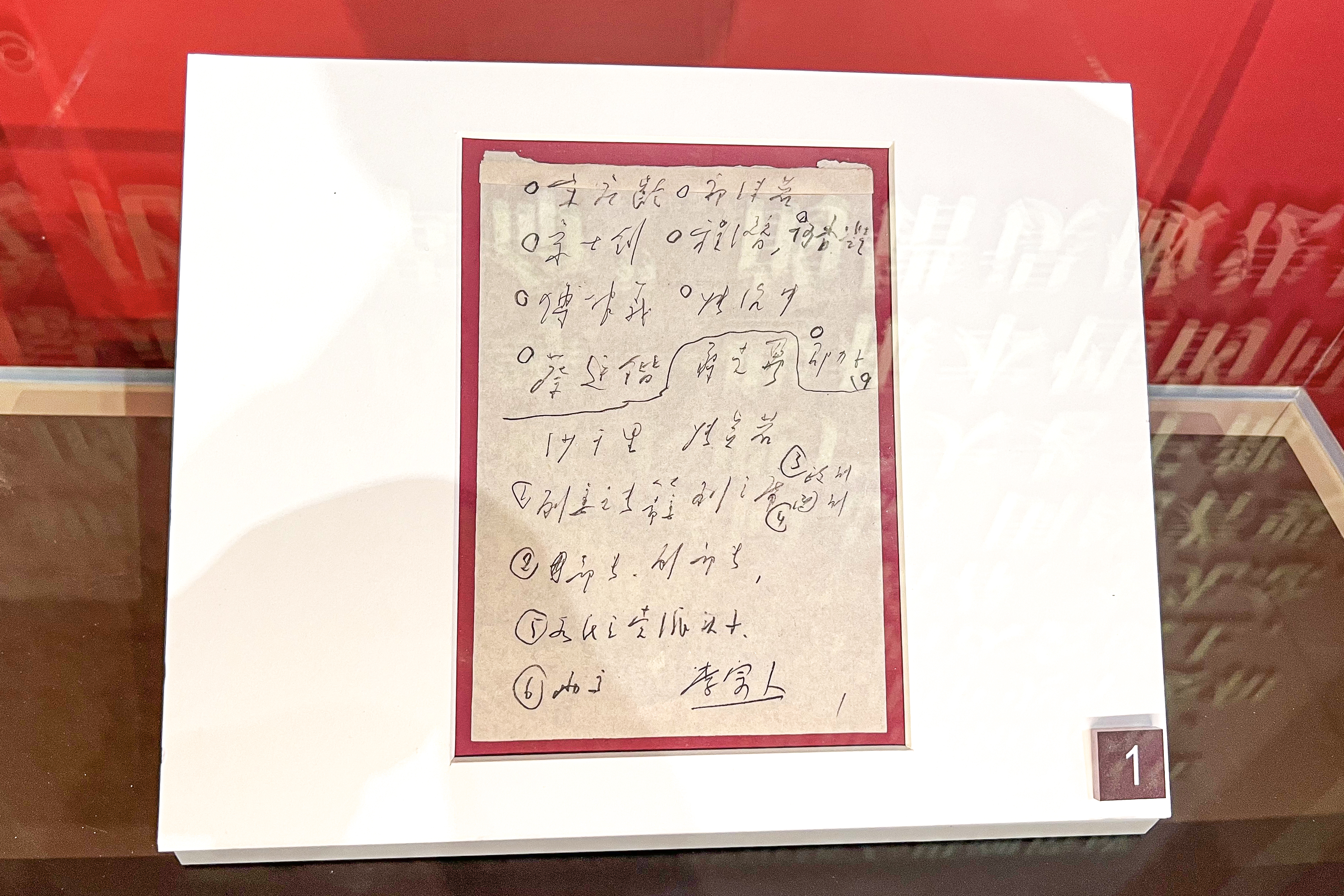
Draft handwritten by Zhou Enlai

A List of Cadres to Be Protected was a roster of prominent individuals compiled by Chinese Premier Zhou Enlai in 1966 to ensure their safety during the Cultural Revolution. The list received approval from Chairman Mao Zedong.

== Background ==
On the night of 29 August 1966, the New Peking University Red Guards ransacked Zhang Shizhao's residence in Beijing. Early in the morning on 30 August, Zhang wrote a letter to Mao Zedong. Mao issued a directive: "Forward this to the Premier for appropriate action; he should be protected." Zhou Enlai severely criticised those involved, ordered the immediate return of all confiscated books, and assigned personnel to safeguard Zhang Shizhao's home. Additionally, Zhou began drafting the list of the cadres to be protected at that time. On 1 September, Zhou further instructed the 301 Hospital to prepare for the admission and protection of Zhang Shizhao, Cheng Qian, Fu Zuoyi, Cai Tingkai, Li Zongren, and others. The list was created in part as a response to the murder of scientist Yao Tongbin.

== List of protected people ==
The list of individuals designated for protection included: Soong Ching-ling, Guo Moruo, Zhang Shizhao, Cheng Qian, He Xiangning, Fu Zuoyi, Zhang Zhizhong, Shao Lizi, Jiang Guangnai, Cai Tingkai, Sha Qianli, and Zhang Xiruo.

In addition, positions specified for protection were:

- Vice chairpersons and members of the Standing Committee of the National People's Congress, as well as the vice president of the State;
- Ministers and vice ministers of various ministries under the State Council of the People's Republic of China;
- Vice chairpersons of the Chinese People's Political Consultative Conference;
- Vice premiers of the State Council;
- Leaders of various democratic parties;
- President of the Supreme People's Court and Procurator-General of the Supreme People's Procuratorate.

Li Zongren was later added to the list.

=== Protected by name ===
Party	Name	Image	Political position	Note
RCCK	Soong Ching-ling		Vice president of China	Madame Sun Yat-sen
CCP	Guo Moruo		Deputy chair of National People's Congress Standing Committee	
None	Zhang Shizhao		Member of National People's Congress Standing Committee	Facilitated Communist take-overs of Beijing and Hunan
RCCK	Cheng Qian		Deputy chair of National People's Congress Standing Committee; Standing Committee Member of the National Committee of the Chinese People's Political Consultative Conference; Vice Chairperson of the Central Committee of the Revolutionary Committee of the Chinese Kuomintang	Facilitated Communist take-overs of Hunan
RCCK	He Xiangning		Vice Chairperson of the Standing Committee of the National People's Congress; Chairperson of the Central Committee of the Revolutionary Committee of the Chinese Kuomintang	Madame Liao Zhongkai
RCCK	Fu Zuoyi		Minister of Water Resources and Electric Power of the People's Republic of China; Vice Chairperson of the National Committee of the Chinese People's Political Consultative Conference; Vice Chairperson of the National Defence Commission of the People's Republic of China; Deputy to the National People's Congress	Facilitated Communist take-overs of Beijing
RCCK	Zhang Zhizhong		Vice Chairperson of the Standing Committee of the National People's Congress; Standing Committee Member of the Central Committee of the Revolutionary Committee of the Chinese Kuomintang	Facilitated Communist take-overs of Beijing
RCCK	Shao Lizi		Member of the Standing Committee of the National People's Congress; Standing Committee Member of the National Committee of the Chinese People's Political Consultative Conference; Standing Committee Member of the Central Committee of the Revolutionary Committee of the Chinese Kuomintang	Facilitated Communist take-overs of Beijing
RCCK	Jiang Guangnai		Minister of the Ministry of Textile Industry of the People's Republic of China; Deputy to the National People's Congress; Standing Committee Member of the Central Committee of the Revolutionary Committee of the Chinese Kuomintang	Leader of Fujian People's Government
RCCK	Cai Tingkai		First Vice Chairman of the Sports Commission of the People's Republic of China; Vice Chairman of the National Committee of the Chinese People's Political Consultative Conference; Member of the Standing Committee of the National People's Congress; Standing Committee Member of the Central Committee of the Revolutionary Committee of the Chinese Kuomintang	Leader of Fujian People's Government
CCP	Sha Qianli		Minister of Grain of the People's Republic of China; Deputy to the National People's Congress; Standing Committee Member of the Central Committee of the China Democratic National Construction Association; Vice Chairman of the executive committee of the All-China Federation of Industry and Commerce	
None	Zhang Xiruo		Director of the Cultural Relations Committee of the People's Republic of China; Standing Committee Member of the National Committee of the Chinese People's Political Consultative Conference; Deputy to the National People's Congress	
KMT	Li Zongren		None	Former president of the Republic of China
