= Lanzhou uranium enrichment plant =

Uranium enrichment plant in Gansu, China

CNNC Lanzhou Uranium Enrichment Co., Ltd.
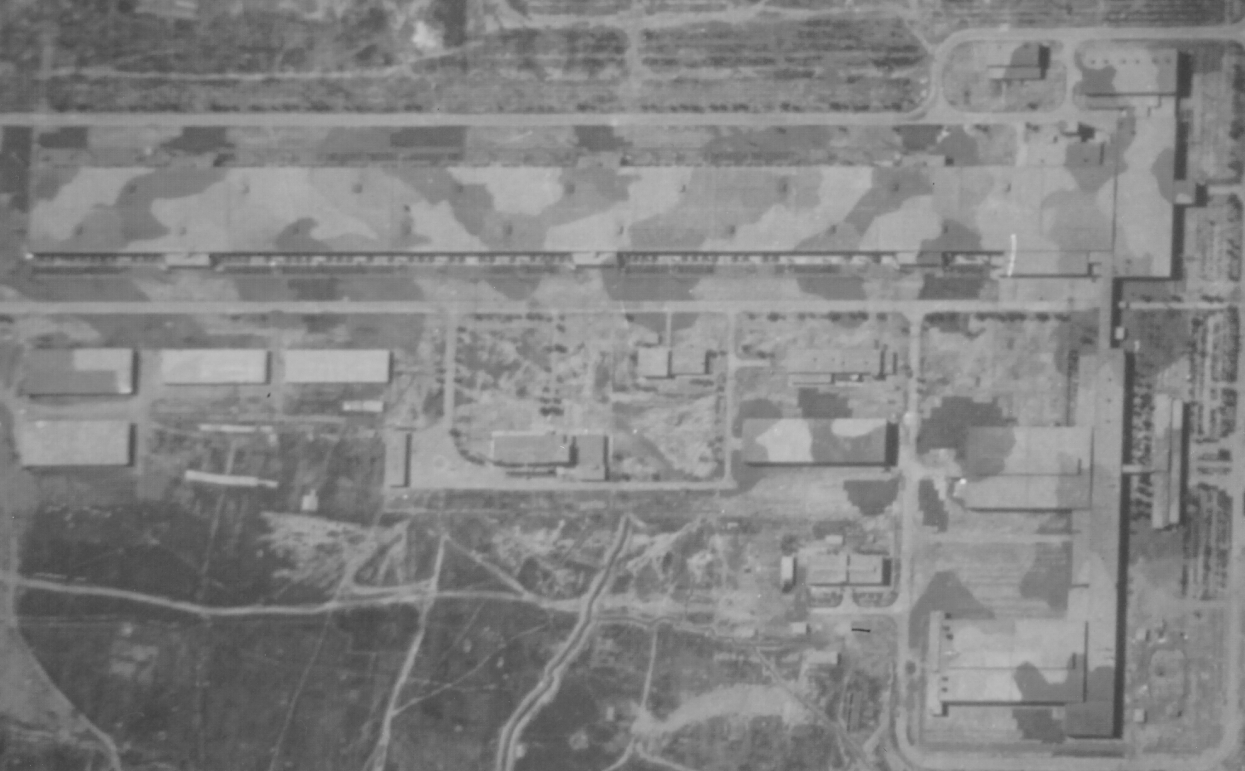
- Lanzhou enrichment plant imaged by a US KH-7 Gambit satellite in 1966. A camouflage pattern is apparent.
- Built: 1958 to 1964
- Operated: 1964-present
- Location: Xigu District, Lanzhou, Gansu, China
- Coordinates: 36.150744°N 103.518431°E
- Industry: Nuclear power
- Products: (post-1980) Low-enriched uranium; Capacity: 4.1-4.6 million SWU/year; (pre-1980) Highly enriched uranium and (since 2023); Capacity: 0.2 million SWU/year (1979) 0.02 million SWU/year (1964)
- Area: 142,600 m^{2} (35.2 acres)

Lanzhou uranium enrichment plant (Chinese official name: CNNC Lanzhou Uranium Enrichment Co., Ltd., weapon program codename: Plant 504) is the largest uranium enrichment plant in China. It currently produces enriched uranium for China's fleet of civilian nuclear reactors and its nuclear program since 2023. It was constructed from 1958 as part of China's nuclear weapons program, producing highly enriched uranium (HEU) for its first (Project 596) and subsequent nuclear tests.

In 1958, the construction began with Soviet assistance, based on the gaseous diffusion plant of the Ural Electrochemical Combine in Novouralsk in Russia. In 1960, Soviet advisors were recalled due to the Sino-Soviet split. Chinese researchers led by Wang Chengshu eventually completed the theoretical design for the plant.

Between 1963 and 1964, American U-2 spy planes took photographs of the site. Initially judged to be too small for HEU production, infrared sensing flights after the first nuclear test confirmed it as operational.

In January 1964, the plant produced its first highly enriched uranium, and by October 1964, it had produced at least the 15 kg (33 lb) used in the China's first nuclear test. China used HEU as the fissile material for its first seven nuclear tests, and began plutonium usage in December 1968. It was China's only site for uranium enrichment until the startup of a similar gaseous diffusion plant at Jinkouhe, Leshan in 1970.

HEU production ended in 1979, as China pivoted to civilian nuclear power. The gaseous diffusion plant produced LEU from 1980 until its shutdown in 2000. To meet increasing demand from new pressurized water reactors, more efficient gas centrifuge enrichment plants were constructed and operated at the Lanzhou site: China Enrichment Plant (CEP) allegedly supplied by Pakistan in 1980 and CEP1 supplied by Russia in 1991 under secret mutual understanding. The CEP2 in 2010, CEP3 in 2012, CEP4 in 2015, CEP5 in 2023, all domestically constructed by the China National Nuclear Corporation (CNNC).

== See also ==
- Project 596, first Chinese nuclear test
- China and weapons of mass destruction, including nuclear weapons
- Two Bombs, One Satellite, China's program to develop the atomic bomb, hydrogen bomb, and space technology
- Ural Electrochemical Combine, analogous first Soviet gaseous diffusion plant, heavily influenced Lanzhou design
