= Leśnica =

Leśnica Leschnitz
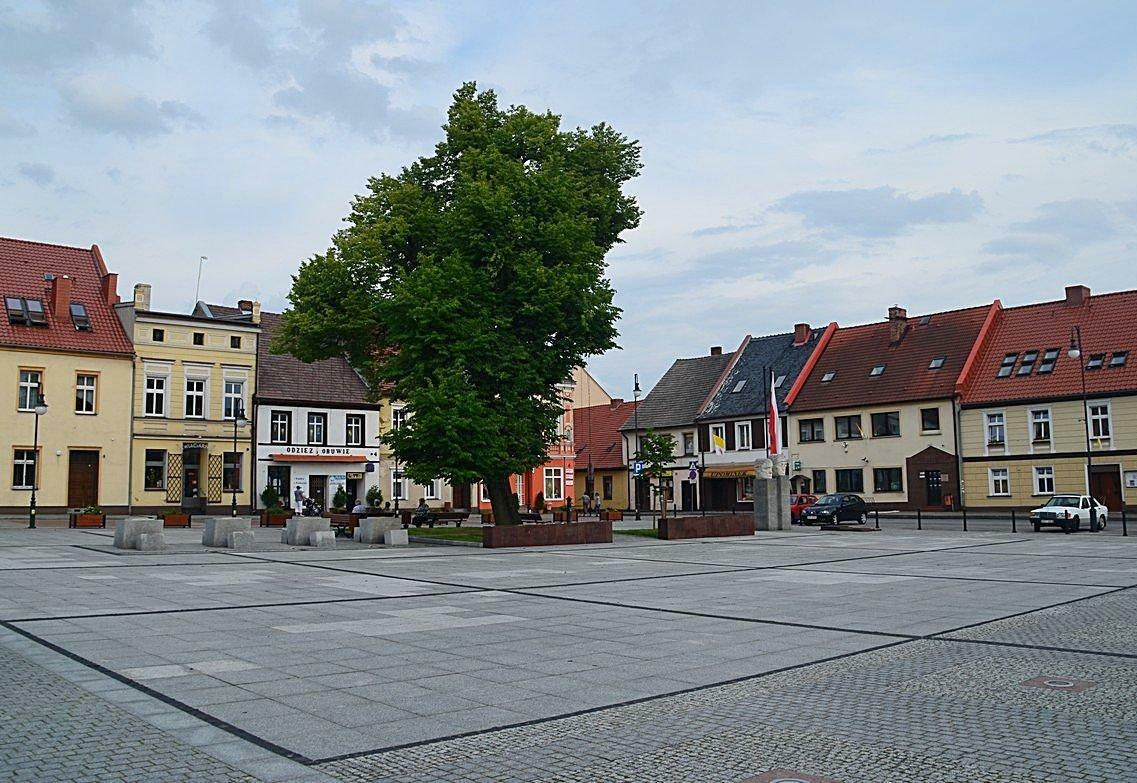
- Main Square

- Flag Coat of arms

- Location within Poland
- Coordinates: 50°25′45″N 18°10′52″E
- Country: Poland
- Voivodeship: Opole
- County: Strzelce
- Gmina: Leśnica
- Established: 13th century
- Town rights: 1217

Government
  - Mayor: Łukasz Jastrzembski

Area
  - Total: 14.45 km^{2} (5.58 sq mi)
- Elevation: 205 m (673 ft)

Population (2019-06-30)
  - Total: 2,556
  - Density: 176.9/km^{2} (458.1/sq mi)
- Time zone: UTC+1 (CET)
  - Summer (DST): UTC+2 (CEST)
- Postal code: 47-150
- Area code: +48 77
- Car plates: OST
- Website: Official website

Leśnica [lɛɕˈɲit͡sa] (German: Leschnitz, 1936-1945: Bergstadt; Silesian: Lesznica) is a town in Poland, located in Strzelce County, Opole Voivodship.

== History ==
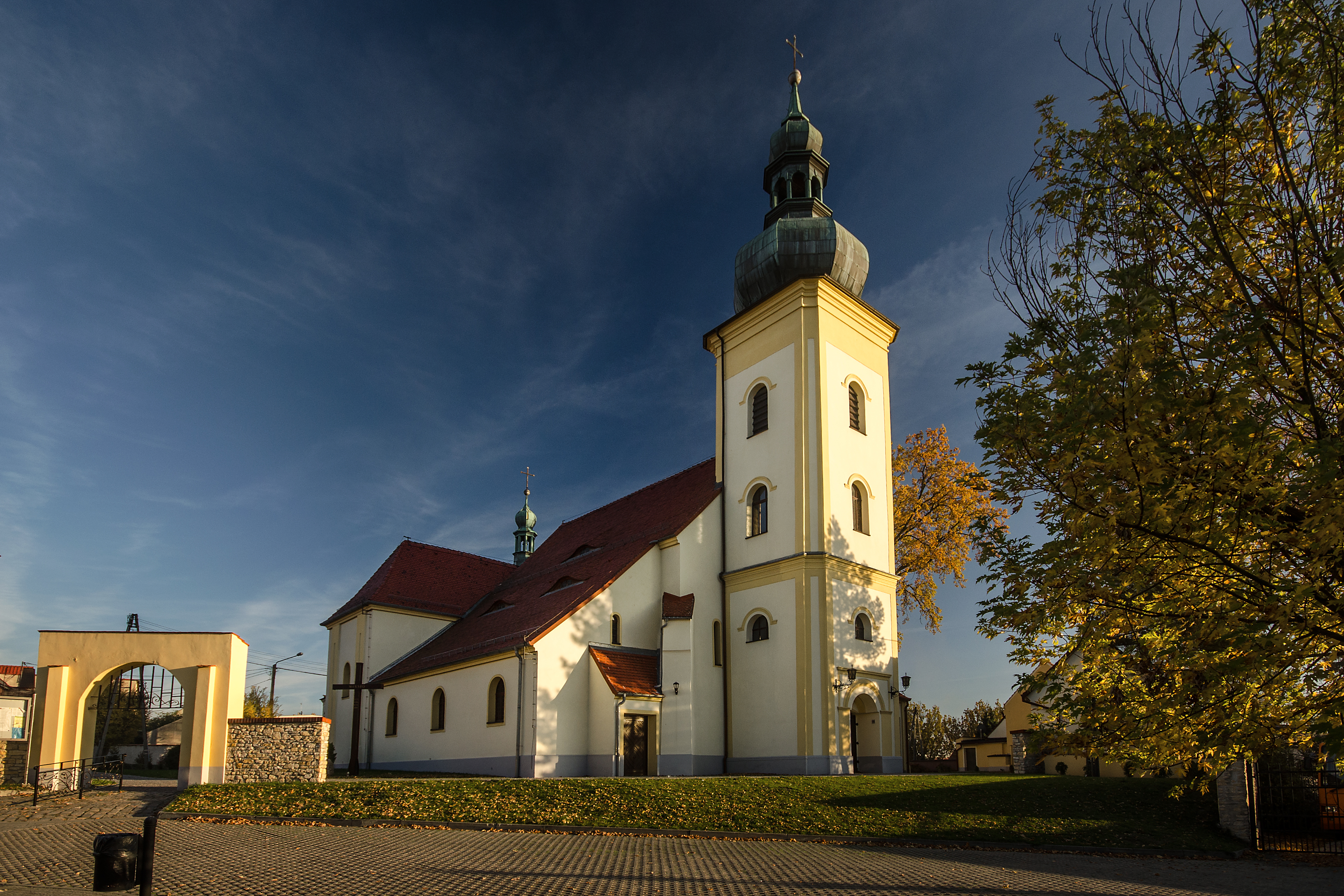
Baroque Holy Trinity church

The oldest known mention of Leśnica comes from a 1217 document of Duke Casimir I of Opole. Its name is derived from the Polish word las ("forest"). The town was part of the Duchy of Opole of fragmented Poland, and remained ruled by the Piast dynasty until 1532. The town was destroyed in 1429 during the Hussite Wars. In 1532 incorporated into the Bohemian Crown Lands, in 1645 it passed to the Poles again under the House of Vasa, and in 1666 it fell back to Bohemia.

Under the Germanized name Leschnitz, it was annexed by the Kingdom of Prussia in 1742 during the First Silesian War. In the 18th century, Leschnitz belonged to the tax inspection region of Neustadt. The town was included in Landkreis Groß Strehlitz within the Prussian Province of Silesia in 1816. Leschnitz became part of the German Empire in 1871 during the unification of Germany. In the 1921 Upper Silesia plebiscite, 89.6% of votes in the town were cast in favour of remaining in Germany.

During the Nazi campaign of renaming of placenames, in 1936 while part of the Province of Upper Silesia, it was renamed Bergstadt ("mountain town") to remove traces of Polish origin. In 1945, it became again part of Poland according to the Potsdam Agreement and the historic name Leśnica was restored. Due to fact that no less than 20% of its population belongs to the German minority in Poland, the town uses bilingual Polish and German signs and language – Polish remains official, German is the language of "assistance".

== Notable people ==
- Theodor Aufrecht (1822–1907), Indologist and Sanskritist
- Falk Valentin Grünfeld (1837–1897), textile merchant and retailer
- Joseph Glowatzki (1847–1936), Catholic clergyman
- Bruno Schindler (1882–1964), Sinologist
- Eugen Piwowarsky (1891–1953), German material scientist and metallurgist
- Gerhard Schaffran (1912–1996), Catholic Bishop of Dresden-Meißen
- Hans Lipinsky-Gottersdorf (1920–1991), German writer

== Twin towns – sister cities ==
See twin towns of Gmina Leśnica.
