= Zhu Guangya =

Chinese nuclear physicist and politician

Zhu Guangya Chu Kuang-Ya
- 朱光亚
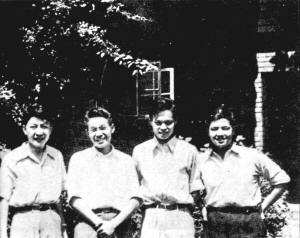
- Left to right: Zhu Guangya, Zhang Wenyu, Chen Ning Yang, and Tsung-Dao Lee (1947)
- Other name: Kuang-Ya Chu
- Citizenship: China
- Education: National Southwestern Associated University (BS); University of Michigan (PhD)
- Scientific career
- Fields: Nuclear physics
- Thesis: A study on the decay schemes of gold-198 and hafnium-181 by means of a beta-ray spectrometer and coincidence measurements (1950)
- Doctoral advisor: M. L. Wiedenbeck

Zhu Guangya (Chinese: 朱光亚; pinyin: Zhū Guāngyà; December 25, 1924 – February 26, 2011; also spelled as Kuang-Ya Chu) was a Chinese nuclear physicist. Zhu Guangya was noted for his dedication to the Chinese nuclear development, and his great devotion to his country.

Zhu Guangya graduated from the National Southwestern Associated University in 1945; in 1950, he received his Ph.D. in physics from the University of Michigan. In 1980, he was elected as a member (academician) of the Chinese Academy of Sciences; in 1991, he served as the chairman of the China Association for Science and Technology. In 1994, he was selected as one of the first academicians of the Chinese Academy of Engineering, and served as the first president of the Chinese Academy of Engineering. In May 1996, he was elected as the honorary chairman of the China Association for Science and Technology; in January 1999, he was appointed the director of the Science and Technology Committee of the People's Liberation Army General Armament Department.

In the early days, Zhu Guangya was mainly engaged in teaching and scientific research in nuclear physics and atomic energy technology; in the late 1950s, he was in charge of and organized and led the research, design, manufacture and testing of China's atomic bombs and hydrogen bombs. Zhu participated in and led the formulation and implementation of the national high-tech research and development plan, and the research on national defense science and technology development strategies. He organized and led the research on the sustainable development of China's nuclear weapons technology under the conditions of the nuclear test ban, the research on arms control and the research on the development strategy of weapons and equipment, and made significant contributions to the development of China's nuclear science and technology and national defense science and technology.

== Biography ==
Zhu Guangya was born on December 25, 1924, in Yichang, Hubei province. He received his early education in Hubei, and later moved to Sichuan province with his family, due to the outbreak of the Second World War. Young Guangya developed his interests in physics during high school in Sichuan, and he got accepted to the Physics Department at the National Central University (nowadays the Nanjing University) in 1941. One year later, he transferred to National Southwestern Associated University where he continued his study in physical science, and graduated in 1945. After graduation, Zhu stayed at the university and became a lecturer. In 1946, Zhu became a graduate student at the University of Michigan, where he later obtained his doctoral degree in physics in 1949.

He returned to China in the spring of 1950. After 1957, he was involved in nuclear reactor research. Together with Deng Jiaxian and others, Zhu led the development of China's atomic bomb and hydrogen bomb program. In 1970, he joined the National Defense Science and Technology Commission (NDSTC) as a deputy director for its nuclear weapons program.

As director of the Commission for Science, Technology, and Industry (COSTIND), Zhu led efforts to study and respond to the US' Strategic Defense Initiative (SDI).

In 1994 when Chinese Academy of Engineering (CAE) was founded, he served as the first president. In 1999, he received an achievement medal in recognition of his contribution to China's Two Bombs, One Satellite projects.

In the influential People's Liberation Army journal China Military Science, Zhu wrote that nuclear weapons are too destructive to be used and that first-use nuclear policies are not credible, stating, "The extreme increase in lethality ... has given rise to many political problems and limited their use."

Zhu was an alternate member of 9th and 10th Central Committees of the Chinese Communist Party (CCP), and a full member of 11th, 12th, 13th and 14th Central Committees of CCP.

Zhu died on February 26, 2011, at the age of 86.
