= Yu Min (physicist) =

Chinese nuclear physicist (1926–2019)

- 于敏
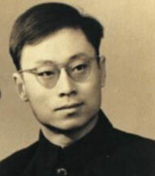
- Born: 16 August 1926; Lutai Town, Ninghe County, Hebei, China (now Ninghe District, Tianjin)
- Died: 16 January 2019 (aged 92); Beijing, China
- Education: Peking University
- Spouse: Sun Yuqin
- Children: 2
- Awards: Highest Science and Technology Award (2014); Medal of the Republic (2019, posthumously)
- Scientific career
- Fields: Nuclear physics
- Institutions: Chinese Academy of Sciences (CAS)

Chinese name
- Chinese: 于敏
Transcriptions
Standard Mandarin
- Hanyu Pinyin: Yú Mǐn

Yu Min (Chinese: 于敏; pinyin: Yú Mǐn; 16 August 1926 – 16 January 2019) was a prominent Chinese nuclear physicist. He was an academic of Chinese Academy of Sciences (CAS), a lead nuclear weapon designer in the Ninth Academy, and a recipient of Two Bombs, One Satellite Achievement Medal. He is remembered as "the father of [the] Chinese Hydrogen Bomb".

Yu was posthumously bestowed the Medal of the Republic, the highest honorary medal of the People's Republic of China, in September 2019.

== Life ==
He was born in Tianjin in August 1926. He was famous for his excellent performances in Yaohua High School. Later he was admitted by Department of Electrical engineering of Peking University, however, out of the passion for the physical theories, he transferred into Department of Physics to work on theory.

From 1949, Yu started his postgraduate research in the Department of Physics of Peking University, and also served as a teaching assistant. In 1951, he became an assistant researcher and associate researcher at Modern Physics Institute of Chinese Academy of Sciences, and began to study nuclear physics theory under the supervision of Peng Huanwu. In 1951 he joined the Institute of Atomic Energy.

Early 1958, with China-Soviet National Defense Contract, Yu and his colleagues including Deng Jiaxian, Sun Yuzhang etc. moved to No.221 Factory near Qinghai Lake.

From the end of 1960, Yu was involved in the theoretical research of nuclear weapons. In 1961 he joined as a member of the Light Nucleus Theory Group set up by Peng the previous year. The working group merged with the Ninth Academy in 1965. Yu's major contributions included the solutions to a series of fundamental and critical theoretical problems of nuclear weapons, which led to the breakthrough of the hydrogen bomb. He gained reputation and became the academician of Chinese Academy of Science for his design of the hydrogen bomb.

By 1978, Yu had planned an approach to neutron bomb design using information he had collected from newspaper reports, proposing to "hammer out" the neutron bomb "through three beats".

In 1980, Yu became deputy director of the Ninth Academy of Nuclear Weapons Research and Design and director of the Ninth Institute (the Beijing Nuclear Weapons Institute).

Yu's involvement with China's nuclear weapons program remained secret until his retirement in 1988. He was awarded the national top science award in January 2015. With the RMB 5 million prize, Yu founded the Yu Min Foundation to support scientific development in China. The following year, he became a laureate of the Asian Scientist 100 by the Asian Scientist.

Yu died in Beijing on 16 January 2019.

== Personal life ==
Yu married Sun Yuqin (Chinese: 孙玉芹). The couple had a son, Yu Xin (Chinese: 于辛), and a daughter, Yu Yuan (Chinese: 于元).
