= Theodor Aufrecht =

German Indologist and comparative linguist (1822–1907)

Simon Theodor Aufrecht (7 January 1822 – 3 April 1907) was a German Indologist and comparative linguist. He was the first Professor of Sanskrit and Comparative Philology at the University of Edinburgh, and subsequently spent two decades as Professor of Indology at the University of Bonn.

== Biography ==
Aufrecht was born in Leschnitz, Prussian Silesia, into a Jewish family; he later adopted Christianity. He was educated at Humboldt-Universität in Berlin, graduating in 1847, in which year he also published a treatise on Sanskrit accent (De Accentu Sancritico, Bonn, 1847), originally his dissertation. With Kirchhoff, he collaborated in the publication of Die umbrischen Denkmäler (Umbrian memorials, 1849–51). With Adalbert Kuhn, he founded the Zeitschrift für vergleichende Sprachforschung (1852). In 1852 he moved to Oxford to assist Friedrich Max Muller in preparation of his edition of Rigveda with Sāyaṇa's commentary. He studied at the Bodleian Library and prepared a catalogue of its collection of Sanskrit manuscripts (Catalogi codicum manuscriptorum bibl. Bodleianae P. VIII. codices Sanscriticos complectens, 1859–64). From 1862 until 1875, he was professor at the University of Edinburgh in Scotland, where he occupied the newly established chair of Sanskrit and comparative philology. There, in 1875, he was granted the degree of LL.D.

In 1875, Aufrecht was appointed to the chair of indology at the University of Bonn, and remained at that post until 1889. Between 1891 and 1903, he published a three volume alphabetical catalogue of all Sanskrit manuscript collections known at the time, in a work titled, Catalogus Catalogorum. This was the first such attempt to catalogue all Indian manuscripts, built on Aufrecht's previous catalogues of Sanskrit manuscripts of libraries of Trinity College, Cambridge (1869), Florence (1892), Leipzig (1901), and München (1909). Beginning in 1935, the University of Madras began working on an updated catalogue called the New Catalogus Catalogorum, which was completed in 2019 with the publication of its 42nd volume.

Aufrecht died in Bonn.

== Bibliography ==
- De accentu sanscritico, Bonnae: H. B. Konig, 1847.
- Ujjvaladatta's Commentary (from a manuscript in the library of the East India House), 1859.
- Die Hymnen des Rigveda, 2 volumes,1877.
- Aitareya Brahmana, 1879.
- Catalogus Catalogorum, 3 volumes, Leipzig, 1891, 1896 and 1903.
