= Military attacks on nuclear facilities =

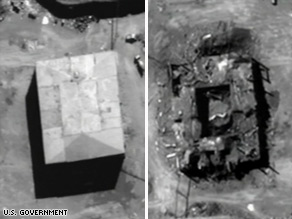
Destruction of suspected Syrian nuclear reactor after Israel's 2007 Operation Outside the Box airstrike

Intentional attacks by organized militaries on facilities for the production of both nuclear weapons and civilian nuclear power have been carried out since the inception of nuclear technologies during World War II. They are often a type of preemptive strike, to prevent an adversary from becoming a nuclear-weapon state and thus shielded from attack by nuclear deterrence. Targeted sites nuclear research facilities, uranium enrichment plants, and nuclear reactors, which may be used to produce weapons-grade plutonium. The latter case is of greater consideration as bombing operational reactors may create significant fallout from dangerous fission products in the reactor fuel.

The first such attacks were carried out in World War II, almost exclusively by the Allies, targeted at facilities of the German nuclear weapons program and Japanese nuclear weapons program, themselves generally limited to laboratories or supply sites such as Vemork. During the Cold War, attacks to prevent nuclear proliferation were considered, such by the Kennedy administration surrounding the first Chinese nuclear test. The Iran–Iraq War during the 1980s marked the first targeting of nuclear reactor sites, with airstrikes, on Iraq's Osiraq reactor and Iran's Bushehr reactor. Israel's Air Force carried out successful airstrikes on regional nuclear facilities: on Iraq's Osiraq reactor in 1981, on a suspected Syrian nuclear reactor in 2007, and on Iranian nuclear facilities in 2025. Since 2022, a crisis has been ongoing at the Zaporizhzhia Nuclear Power Plant in Ukraine following its occupation by Russian forces.

== See also ==
- Assassinations of Iranian nuclear scientists
- Nuclear arms race
