= Cheng Kaijia =

Chinese physicist

- Born: 3 August 1918; Suzhou, Jiangsu, China
- Died: 17 November 2018 (aged 100); Beijing, China
- Education: Zhejiang University; University of Edinburgh
- Scientific career
- Fields: Nuclear physics Nuclear engineering
- Doctoral advisor: Max Born

Chinese name
- Traditional Chinese: 程開甲
- Simplified Chinese: 程开甲
Transcriptions
Standard Mandarin
- Hanyu Pinyin: Chéng Kāijiǎ
- Wade–Giles: Ch'eng K'ai-chia

Cheng Kaijia (Chinese: 程开甲; 3 August 1918 – 17 November 2018), also known as Kai Chia Cheng, was a Chinese nuclear engineer and nuclear physicist. He was a pioneer and key figure in Chinese nuclear weapon development. He is known as one of the founding fathers of Two Bombs, One Satellite.

== Life ==
Cheng was born in Wujiang, Jiangsu in 1918. He graduated from the Department of Physics of Zhejiang University in 1941. In 1946, he went to the United Kingdom to study at the University of Edinburgh, obtaining a PhD in 1948 under advisor Max Born. He then became a researcher in the UK.

Cheng returned to the People's Republic of China in 1950. He was an associate professor at Zhejiang University, he then went to Nanjing in 1952, where he became an associate professor in Nanjing University, and was later promoted to full professorship.

Cheng was a pioneer of Chinese nuclear technology and played an important role in the development of the first Chinese atomic bomb. He first calculated out the inner temperature and pressure for an atomic bomb blast in China. His calculation was an extremely heavy task and nearly manual, because during that time China did not have any computer or even calculator. He also solved the mechanism of the inner explosion, which could support the design of the bomb. He was the chief director for many nuclear weapon test fields/bases and their explosion processes.

Cheng was elected to the Chinese Academy of Sciences in 1980. He was also a standing member of the Science and Technology Committee, Chinese National Nuclear Industry Corporation. He was former vice-president of the Nuclear Weapons Research Institute, and the deputy chief director of the Nuclear Weapons Research Institute, People's Republic of China.

In 1999, he was awarded "Two Bombs and One Satellite Meritorious Award" by President Jiang Zemin for his contribution on atomic bomb and hydrogen bomb. In July 2017, Chairman Xi Jinping awarded Cheng the Order of August First, the highest military award of People's Republic of China.

He died on 17 November 2018, three months after his 100th birthday.

== See also ==
- Project 596 – China's first nuclear weapons test
