= Wu Ziliang =

Chinese metallurgist

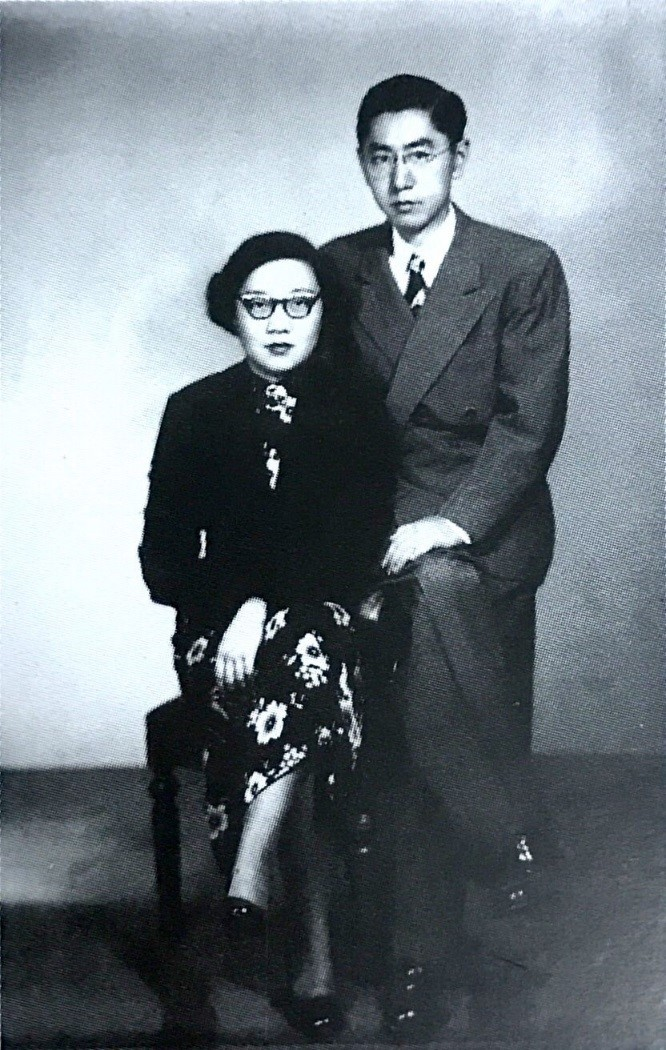
Wu Ziliang and wife Xu Ren in 1952

Wu Ziliang (Chinese: 吴自良; 25 December 1917 – 24 May 2008), also known as Tsu-Liang Wu, was a Chinese materials engineer, physical metallurgist, and physicist. He led the team that developed the essential membrane separation technology which enabled China to separate uranium-235 used for making its first nuclear bomb. He was awarded the Two Bombs, One Satellite Meritorious Medal in 1999, and also made significant contributions to steel metallurgy, semiconductors, and superconductivity research. Wu was a fellow of the American Association for the Advancement of Science and an academician of the Chinese Academy of Sciences.

== Early life ==
Wu was born in December 1917 in Pujiang County, Zhejiang, Republic of China. He was the seventh and youngest child of his father, a Qing dynasty xiucai who later became a lawyer. When Wu was a child, his father died and the family fell into poverty. He worked as a cowherd for two years and did not attend elementary school until 1926. He excelled in school and tested into Zhejiang Provincial No. 1 Middle School and later Hangzhou High School, two of the best schools in the provincial capital Hangzhou.

== Second Sino-Japanese War ==
In 1935, Wu was admitted to the Mining and Metallurgy Department of Peiyang University (now Tianjin University). A year later, he transferred to the newly established Department of Aeronautical Mechanics. After the Second Sino-Japanese War broke out in July 1937, Tianjin fell under Japanese occupation and Peiyang University evacuated to Xi'an in inland China. In 1938, Peiyang and other universities exiled from the occupied areas established the Northwestern Engineering Institute in a mountainous village in Chenggu County, using a temple as its classroom. Despite the difficult wartime conditions, Wu later recalled that the professors and students were highly competent and motivated. He was especially impressed by his professor Wei Shoukun and the older classmate Ye Peida.

Upon graduation in 1939, Wu worked as a junior designer at the Sino-American Central Aircraft Manufacturing Company in Leiyun (or Loiwing), Yunnan. In 1942, the aircraft factory was bombed by the Japanese and forced to move to Kunming, and Wu worked as an engineer at the Central Machinery Works. He was later dismissed from the factory for refusing to join the Kuomintang.

== Career in the United States ==
In 1943, Wu went to the United States to pursue graduate studies with financial support from his eldest sister, who was a doctor. He attended Carnegie Institute of Technology, where he earned his D.Sc. in physical metallurgy in 1948 and then worked as a post-doctoral researcher. From 1949 to 1950 he worked as an engineer for a naval research project in the Department of Material Science and Engineering of Syracuse University. He was elected a Fellow of the American Association for the Advancement of Science in 1950. Despite his career success, Wu was offended by the racism he experienced in the American society. He later recalled an incident when he was shopping at a high-end clothing store, the salesperson assumed he was a laundryman coming to pick up clothes for a customer.

== Career in the People's Republic of China ==
After the founding of the People's Republic of China in 1949, Wu returned to China in early 1951 and became a professor in the Department of Metallurgical Engineering at Tangshan Jiaotong University (now Southwest Jiaotong University). Later that year, he transferred to the Shanghai Institute of Metallurgy (SIM) of the Chinese Academy of Sciences. At SIM he developed manganese molybdenum steel, which became widely produced in steel works in China, and he received the State Natural Science Award (Third Class) in 1956. He was later promoted to deputy director of SIM.

In 1961, Wu was put in charge of the development of membrane separation technology for separating uranium-235, used in nuclear fission chain reaction, from uranium-238, the predominant isotope of uranium that cannot sustain a chain reaction. It was an essential technology for making nuclear bombs, but highly challenging because of the similar physical and chemical properties of the two isotopes. Under Wu's leadership, a team of more than 60 scientists developed the technology at SIM in three years. On 16 October 1964, China exploded its first nuclear bomb.

In the 1970s, Wu researched semiconductors and large-scale integrated circuit, laying the foundation for the production of China's first integrated circuit at SIM. In the late 1980s and early 1990s, he made significant discoveries in the research of the superconductor yttrium barium copper oxide (YBCO).

== Honours and recognition ==
For his achievement in nuclear research, Wu was awarded the National Invention Prize (First Class) in 1984 and a Special Prize of the State Science and Technology Progress Award in 1985. In 1999, he was among the 23 scientists awarded the Two Bombs, One Satellite Meritorious Medal. He also received the Ho Leung Ho Lee Prize for Technological Sciences. He was elected an academician of the Chinese Academy of Sciences in 1980.

== Personal life ==
In 1952, Wu married Xu Ren (徐仁), an English instructor at Aurora University and later Fudan University. They had two sons, Wu Kangqi (吴康琪) and Wu Danlin (吴丹琳).

Wu died on 24 May 2008 in Shanghai, at the age of 90.
