= Catalogus Catalogorum =

Catalogus Catalogorum (Latin, "Catalog of Catalogs") is a list of all existing works written in the ancient Indian language varieties, including Sanskrit, and their authors, begun in 1891 by the German Indologist and Sanskritist Theodor Aufrecht.

Theodor Aufrecht himself wrote a total of three volumes between 1891 and 1903. In November 1935, this work was resumed under the name New Catalogus Catalogorum at the suggestion of A. C. Woolner, the then vice-chancellor of the University of the Punjab, and with the support of the British government, and is now under the leadership of the University of Madras. Just two years later, a new edition of the Catalogus Catalogorum was published based on Aufrecht's work.

In 1949, the first volume of the revised New Catalogus Catalogorum, which was planned for forty volumes, was published. Fourteen of the planned forty volumes have been published so far (2013) and more are in preparation. Forty-two were published in 2019.

In terms of content, this alphabetical index covers a thematic range that includes all areas of life.
