= Yao Tongbin =

Chinese scientist and missile engineer

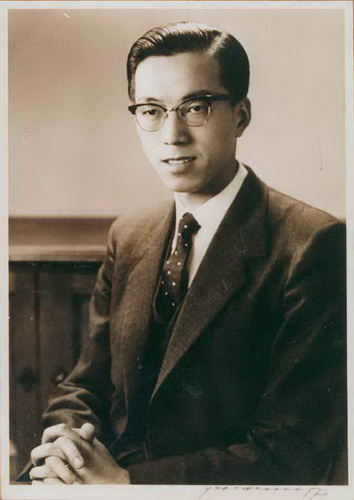
- Yao in Aachen, West Germany, shortly before his return to China in 1957
- Born: Yao Tongbin; September 3, 1922; Wuxi, Jiangsu Province, Republic of China
- Died: June 8, 1968 (aged 45); Beijing, People's Republic of China
- Education: National Tangshan Engineering College (B.A.); University of Birmingham (PhD)
- Awards: Two Bombs, One Satellite Meritorious Award
- Scientific career
- Fields: Metallurgy
- Workplaces: Royal School of Mines; RWTH Aachen University
- Academic advisors: Eugen Piwowarsky

Yao Tongbin (Chinese: 姚桐斌; September 3, 1922 – June 8, 1968) was a Chinese scientist and one of China's foremost missile engineers. He was beaten to death during the Cultural Revolution in 1968. In 1999, he was posthumously awarded the "Two Bombs, One Satellite Meritorious Award", and became officially recognized as a "martyr" within contemporary China.

== Early life and education ==
Yao was born in Wuxi, Jiangsu Province. He graduated from the department of metallurgy of National Tangshan Engineering College, now Southwest Jiaotong University in July 1945, and obtained a doctorate of foundry engineering from University of Birmingham in UK in 1951. In June 1953, Yao earned a Diploma in Metallurgy from the Royal School of Mines, Imperial College London. At the invitation of Eugen Piwowarsky from the RWTH Aachen University, he moved to West Germany in early 1954 and worked at Aachen as a research assistant at what was then the Institute for Ferrous Metallurgy.

== Career ==
After returning to China in September 1957, Yao served in the Fifth Academy of the Ministry of National Defense, headed by Qian Xuesen. He helped found the Institute of Materials and Technology (later affiliated to the Seventh Ministry of Machine Building) and became the director.

== Murder ==
During the Cultural Revolution, the Seventh Ministry experienced conflicting factions within it. In January 1967, key leadership including Qian Xuesen were ousted for several months; Zhou Enlai ultimately intervened and reversed the ouster. Conflict, including physical conflict, later resumed.

Within the Seventh Ministry, two mass factions, labeled as "915" and "916" respectively, appeared in September 1966. Whereas Faction 915 comprised mainly administrative office staff members and blue collar workers and was regarded as the "conservative" faction, Faction 916 primarily consisted of scientists, engineers, and technicians and was regarded as the "rebel" faction. The differences in opinion between the two factions soon escalated into warfare, spreading from the Third Academy to the First Academy and then throughout the entire Seventh Ministry. On June 8, 1968, Yao Tongbin, who was part of Faction 916, was beaten to death at his own home by members of Faction 915.

== Legacy ==
After this loss of one of China's foremost missile engineers, Zhou Enlai ordered special protection for key technical experts. Yao's death was later described as a "major blow" to China's missile programs.

After the end of the Cultural Revolution, the two perpetrators were sentenced in 1979 to 15 years and 12 years in prison for the murder of Yao.

Because of his significant contribution to China's astronautical materials and technology, Yao was posthumously awarded the Two Bombs, One Satellite Meritorious Award in 1999 by Chinese government, over three decades after his murder.
