= Deng Jiaxian =

Chinese nuclear physicist (1924–1986)

Deng Jiaxian Teng Chia-Hsien
- 邓稼先
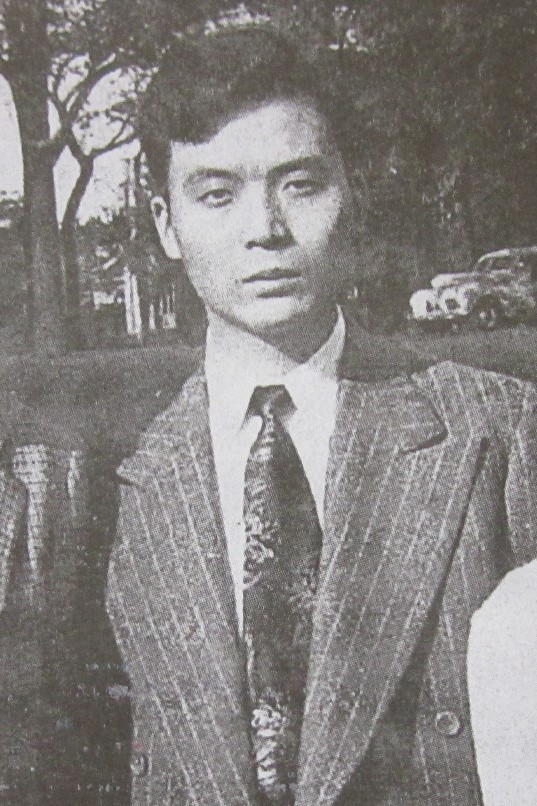
- Deng in 1949
- Born: June 25, 1924; Huaining County, Anhui, Republic of China
- Died: July 29, 1986 (aged 62); Beijing, People's Republic of China
- Education: National Southwestern Associated University (BS); Purdue University (PhD)
- Spouse: Xu Luxi
- Children: 2
- Scientific career
- Fields: Nuclear physics
- Workplaces: China Academy of Engineering Physics
- Thesis: The photo-disintegration of the deuteron (1950)
- Doctoral advisors: Dirk ter Haar; Frederik Belinfante

Chinese name
- Traditional Chinese: 鄧稼先
- Simplified Chinese: 邓稼先
Transcriptions
Standard Mandarin
- Hanyu Pinyin: Dèng Jiàxiān
- Wade–Giles: Teng Chia-hsien

Deng Jiaxian (June 25, 1924 – July 29, 1986; also spelled as Teng Chia-Hsien) was a Chinese theoretical physicist, nuclear physicist, member of the Chinese Academy of Sciences, member of the 12th Central Committee of the Chinese Communist Party, and member of the Central Committee of the Jiusan Society. Deng Jiaxian graduated from the National Southwestern Associated University of the Republic of China, then went to the United States to study, and received a doctorate in physics from Purdue University in 1950. Deng Jiaxian made significant contributions to the development of the atomic bomb of the People's Republic of China and was honored as the "Patriot of the Two Bombs". In 1999, he was named the "Patron of the Two Bombs and One Star" by the Chinese government.

== Early life and education ==
Deng Jiaxian, born on June 25, 1924 in Huaining, Anhui, during the Republic of China era, had a father named Deng Yizhe who was an academic. His father studied overseas at Waseda University and Columbia University before returning to teach esthetics and art theory at various Chinese universities such as Peking University and Tsinghua University. Naming his son "Jiaxian," which symbolizes flourishing crops in hopes that he would grow roots deeply on Chinese soil for the benefit of society. Growing up under his father's guidance from a young age in Beijing schools like Peking Chongde Middle School where besides regular studies he delved into traditional texts and poetry recitations daily while focusing later on English language skills alongside mathematics.

During troubling times post-Marco Polo Bridge Incident when Japanese invaders pressured students to show support publicly for their cause by waving flags; Deng Yizhe fearing persecution sent his son away to Kunming instructing him firmly to pursue science over literature emphasizing its importance for national progress. This directive influenced Deng Jiaxian profoundly towards choosing a scientific path dedicated to serving his country.

In 1946 from National Southwestern Associated University. Deng taught at Beijing University and then studied at Purdue University, earning his PhD in nuclear physics.

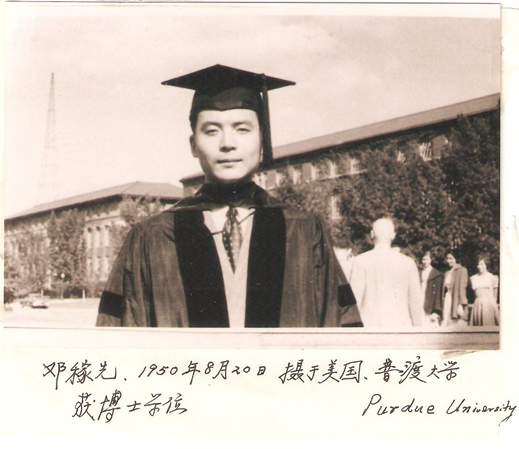
Deng at Purdue University in August 1950, after receiving his Ph.D.

== Career ==
Deng Jiaxian served as assistant researcher and associate researcher at the Institute of Modern Physics, Chinese Academy of Sciences. He joined the Chinese Communist Party in 1956.

Deng joined China's nuclear weapons research institute soon after its establishment in July 1958. From then on, Deng collaborated for more than two decades in secrecy with a group of young scientists, including Qian Sanqiang, as part of China's Two Bombs, One Satellite initiative to develop nuclear and hydrogen bombs. He led the theoretical group responsible for weapon designs.

After the Soviet Union reneged on its promises of nuclear support made in the New Defense Technical Accord, Deng and his team were tasked with designing China's first atomic bomb, starting with the incomplete information provided by the Soviet experts during a single lecture. Deng and his group conducted the "Nine Calculations," a milestone of China's nuclear weapons program which confirmed a key weapons design parameter (the central pressure needed to reach supercriticality in an implosion-type atomic bomb). In March 1963, Deng submitted the preliminary design of China's first atomic bomb.

The efforts of Deng and his group led to successful outcomes in 1964 and 1967. Subsequently, in 1972, he was appointed deputy director at the Ninth Institute of the Ministry of Nuclear Industry and later served as its director. On April 9, 1982, Deng Jiaxian was named deputy director of the Science and Technology Commission at the Ministry of Nuclear Industry by the State Council. In June 1986, he was appointed by the Central Military Commission as director of the National Defense Science and Technology Commission, Deputy Director of the Committee's Science and Technology Committee, and Member of the 12th Central Committee of the Chinese Communist Party.

Deng Jiaxian is a pioneer and founder of China's nuclear weapons cause. In the research of nuclear bombs and hydrogen bombs, Deng Jiaxian led the basic theoretical research on detonation physics, fluid mechanics, equation of state, neutron transport, etc., conducted a large number of simulation calculations and analyzes of the physical processes of atomic bombs, and took the lead in China's independent research on nuclear weapons. He led the completion of the theoretical plan for the atomic bomb and participated in guiding the detonation simulation tests of nuclear tests. After the atomic bomb test was successful, forces were immediately organized to explore the design principles of the hydrogen bomb and select technical approaches.

On 13 September 1979, Chinese nuclear test 21-715 (a H-bomb) failed when the bomb's parachute did not open and it crashed into the desert six kilometers away from the intended airburst center. As head of the program, Deng went to the accident site investigate in an effort to show his responsibility, despite his colleague's attempt to dissuade him from doing so. The dispersed plutonium contaminated Deng heavily and may have contributed to the development of rectal cancer, which caused his death on 29 July 1986.

According to China's nuclear scientists, the date of China's last nuclear test (29 July 1996) was selected to memorialize the tenth anniversary of Deng's death.

During his lifetime, Deng participated in a total of 32 nuclear tests conducted by China, of which he personally went to Lop Nur to command the test team 15 times. Deng is regarded as the "Father of China's Nuclear Program". In 1999, he was posthumously awarded the Two Bombs, One Satellite Meritorious Award by President Jiang Zemin for his contributions to Chinese military science, along with 22 other scientists.

== Publications ==
- Collected articles on Deng Jiaxian
- Deng Jiaxian Academic Lectures I
- Deng Jiaxian's Academic Lectures II-Quantum Field Theory (rearranged version) 2014 Peking University Press
- Deng Jiaxian's Academic Lectures III-Group Theory (rearranged edition) 2014 Peking University Press
- "Angular Correlation of Beta Decay"
- "Effects of Radiation Loss on Free Vibration in Accelerators"
- "Deformation of Hydrogen Nucleus"
- "Summary of theoretical research on China's first atomic bomb"

== Personal life ==
=== Cultural Revolution ===
As one of the most significant scholars in China during the Cultural Revolution, Deng Jiaxian found himself in peril. In 1969, during the purge of class forces, he and many nuclear weapons scientists were criticized by the "Two Zhaos" of the Military Control Commission at Qinghai Base Factory 221. Explosives expert Qian Jin was beaten to death. According to Xu Luxi, Mrs. Deng, it happened that Sino-US relations were thawing (refer to Ping Pong Diplomacy). In July 1971, Yang Zhenning visited relatives in the People's Republic of China for the first time and wanted to reunite with Deng Jiaxian. Zhou Enlai recalled Deng Jiaxian to Beijing, and Deng Jiaxian left Qinghai. During the Cultural Revolution persecution, Yu Min, Chen Nengkuan, and Hu Side were also saved. Since then, no one has dared to endanger the lives of scientists in the 221 Factory.

=== Family and relationship ===
Wife: Xu Luxi (August 11, 1928-) Daughter of Xu Deheng.

Daughter: Deng Zhidian (October 1954-)

Son: Deng Zhiping (November 1956-)

== See also ==
- Project 596
- Two Bombs, One Satellite
- Abdul Qadeer Khan
- Bertrand Goldschmidt
- Homi J. Bhabha
- Igor Kurchatov
- J. Robert Oppenheimer
- William Penney, Baron Penney
