= Sha Qianli =

Chinese politician

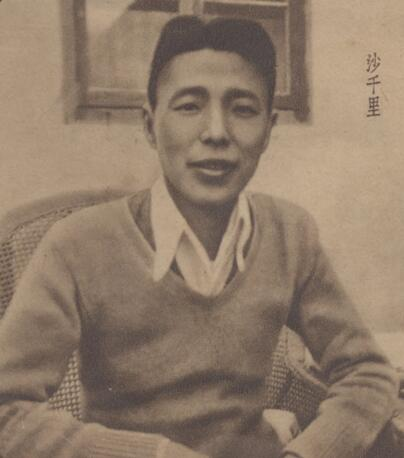
Sha Qianli

Sha Qianli (Chinese: 沙千里; 1901 – April 26, 1982) was a Chinese politician, who served as the vice chairperson of the Chinese People's Political Consultative Conference.
