= Project 596 =

First Chinese nuclear test, 1964

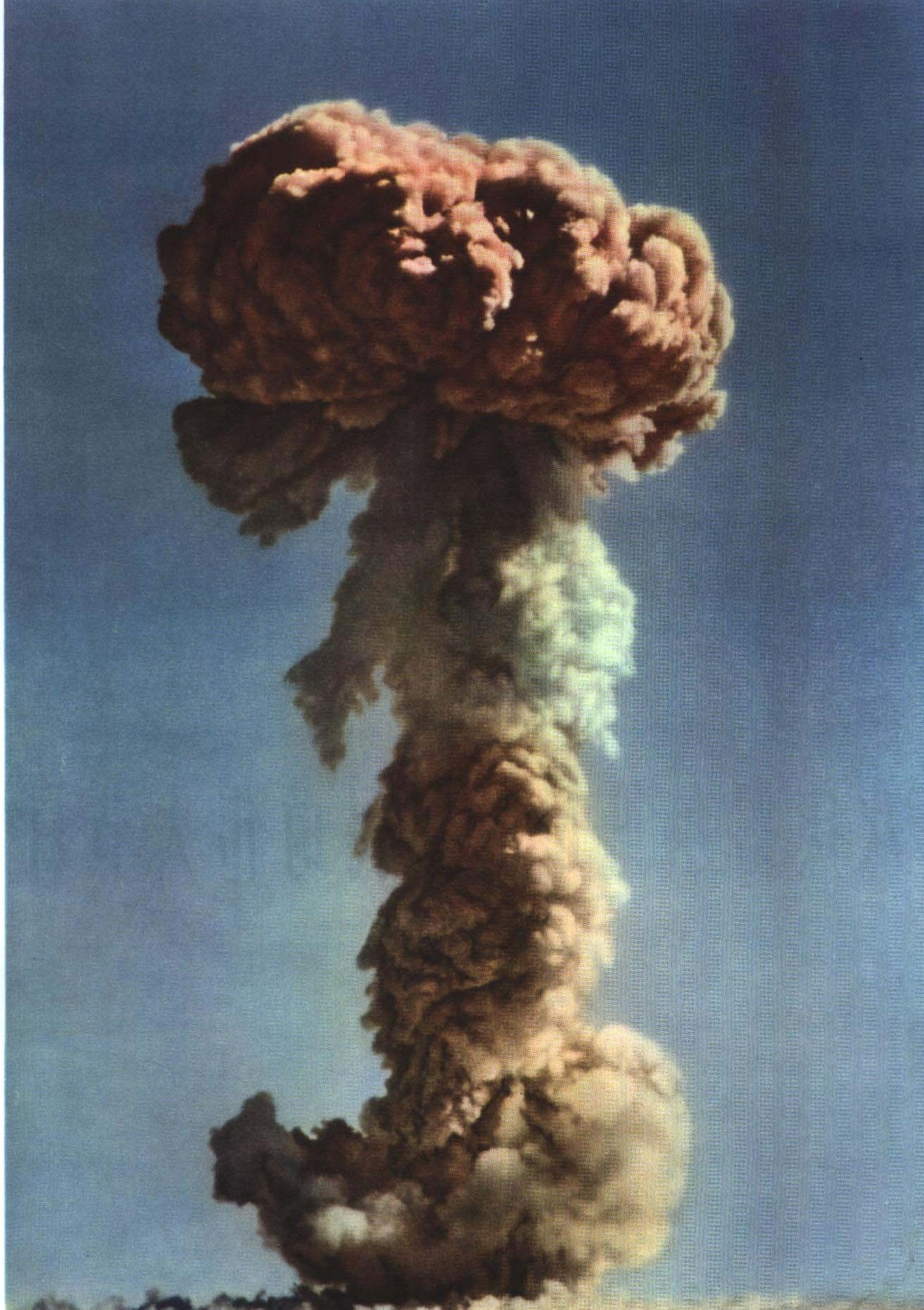
- The mushroom cloud from the test

Information
- Country: People's Republic of China
- Test site: Lop Nur Test Base
- Period: 16 October 1964
- Number of tests: 1
- Test type: Atmospheric
- Device type: Fission
- Max. yield: 22 kilotons of TNT (92 TJ)

Test chronology

Project 596 (Miss Qiu, Chinese: 邱小姐; pinyin: Qiū Xiǎojiě, as the callsign; Chic-1 by the US intelligence agencies) was the first nuclear test of the nuclear weapons program of China, detonated on 16 October 1964, at the Lop Nur test site in Xinjiang. It was an implosion fission device containing about 15 kg weapons-grade uranium (U-235), produced at the Lanzhou enrichment plant.

It had a yield of 22 kilotons, comparable to the Soviet Union's first nuclear bomb RDS-1 in 1949 and the American Fat Man bomb dropped on Nagasaki, Japan in 1945. Key figures in the device's design included Deng Jiaxian, Qian Sanqiang, and Peng Huanwu. With the test, China became the world's fifth nuclear-armed state. This was the first of 45 successful nuclear tests China conducted between 1964 and 1996, all of which occurred at the Lop Nur test site. The atomic bomb is now honored under China's "Two Bombs, One Satellite".

Premier Zhou Enlai announced the test the same day, during which he criticized US "nuclear blackmail" and the 1963 Partial Nuclear Test Ban Treaty as imposing a "nuclear monopoly". A key moment in the history of the People's Republic, the test influenced the ultimate UN recognition of the mainland seven years later, and China's advance towards a superpower. US leadership had previously decided against military strikes on nuclear facilities in China; following the test its espionage against the program was enhanced. The test caused the government of Taiwan under Chiang Kai-shek to pursue its own clandestine nuclear weapons until 1988. Relations with the Soviet Union, which had turned hostile since 1961, worsened after the test; tensions briefly approached nuclear war in 1969.

== Development ==
=== Motivation ===
The Chinese nuclear weapons program was initiated on 15 January 1955. The decision made by the Chinese leadership was prompted by confrontations with the United States in the 1950s, including the Korean War, the 1955 Taiwan Straits Crisis, nuclear blackmail, and eventually the Vietnam War as well. Mao Zedong explained his decision to a gathering of the Politburo of the Chinese Communist Party in 1956:

"Now we're already stronger than we were in the past, and in the future we'll be even stronger than now. Not only are we going to have more airplanes and artillery, but also the atomic bomb. In today's world, if we don't want to be bullied, we have to have this thing."

=== Design and testing ===
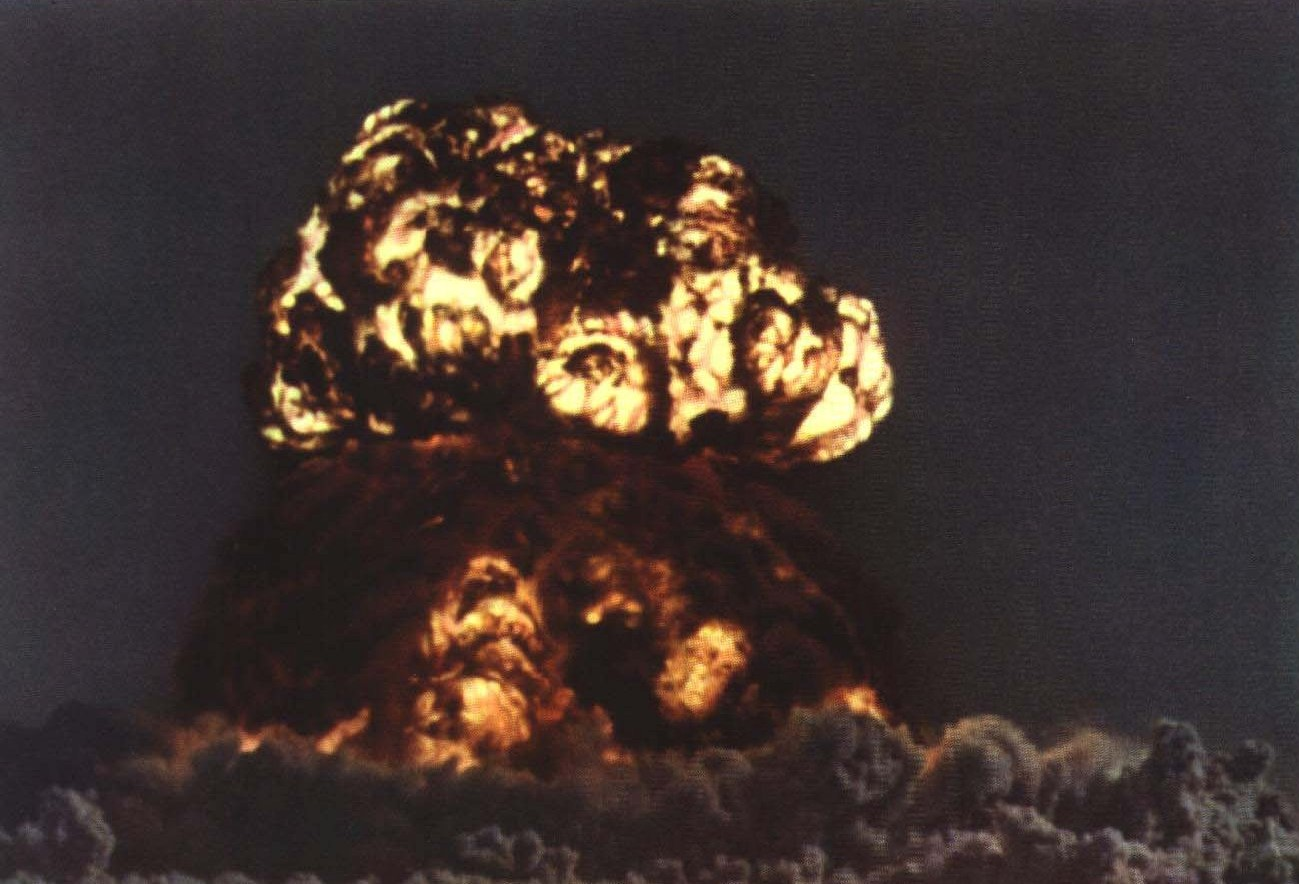
The mushroom cloud

In 1956, the Third Ministry of Machinery Building was established, and nuclear research was conducted at the Institute of Physics and Atomic Energy in Beijing. A gaseous diffusion uranium enrichment plant was constructed in Lanzhou. In 1957, China and the USSR signed an agreement on sharing defense technology that involved a prototype boosted fission weapon being supplied by Moscow to Beijing, technical data, and an exchange of hundreds of Russian and Chinese scientists. A joint search for uranium in China was conducted between the two countries. A location near Lake Lop Nur in Xinjiang was selected to be the test site with its headquarters at Malan. Construction of the test site began on 1 April 1960, involving tens of thousands of laborers and prisoners under tough conditions. It took four years to complete. Being the sole site for nuclear testing in China for years to come, the Lop Nur test site underwent extensive expansion and is by far the world's largest nuclear weapons test site, covering around 100,000 square kilometers.

Sino-Soviet relations cooled during 1958 to 1959. The Soviet Union was also engaged in test ban negotiations with the United States in 1959 in order to relax Soviet-American tensions, directly inhibiting the delivery of a prototype to China. Broader disagreements between Soviet and Chinese communist ideologies escalated mutual criticism. The Soviets responded by withdrawing the delivery of a prototype bomb and over 1,400 Russian advisers and technicians involved in 200 scientific projects in China meant to foster cooperation between the two countries.

Project 596 was named after the month of June 1959 in which it was initiated as an independent nuclear program after the Soviet Union announced it would not provide the technical assistance it had promised under the New Defense Technical Accord. Mao shifted toward an overall policy of self-reliance. The Second Ministry of Machine Building Industry, which oversaw China's nuclear industry, continued with the development of an atomic bomb. The project was facilitated by the 119, China's first self-developed large-scale digital computer, which the China Academy of Sciences had also debuted in 1964. By 14 January 1964, Plant 504 in Lanzhou had successfully enriched sufficient fissile uranium-235 for the project. There are wild unscientific speculation that it used uranium deuteride as a neutron initiator. The fissile pit, in two hemispheres composed entirely of highly enriched uranium, weighed about 15 kilograms, corresponding to a diameter of 11.4 cm.

According to Arms Control and Disarmament Agency director William Foster, the American government, under the Kennedy and Johnson administrations, was concerned about China's nuclear program and studied ways to sabotage or attack it, perhaps with the aid of Taiwan or the Soviet Union, but Khrushchev was not interested. In 1964 as China prepared for its first nuclear weapon test, Chinese leadership received intelligence which increased its concerns that the United States would commit a surgical strike on its nuclear program. These concerns prompted consideration of whether China should delay its first test, on the theory that a test would alert the United States and the Soviet Union to the progress of China's nuclear capabilities, but China would not yet be able to deploy nuclear devices to deter or counter an attack. In September 1964, Mao Zedong decided that the planned test should proceed, stating, "[T]he atomic bomb is to frighten others. It [does] not necessarily [need to be] utilized. Since it is for frightening, it is better to expose it early." The test preparations proceeded with additional air defenses and security against sabotage.

On 16 October 1964, a uranium-235 fission implosion device, weighing 1550 kilograms was detonated on a 102-meter tower. The news was relayed to Mao, who requested confirmation of it three times and instructed, "Continue to observe, check in detail, and let foreigners believe." At 19:00, Zhou Enlai announced the successful test to 3,000 audience members and performers who had gathered at the Great Hall of the People after a performance of The East is Red. He stated, "Tell everyone the good news: at three o'clock this afternoon, our first atomic bomb was tested successfully!" The crowd cheered.

== International statements ==
=== China ===
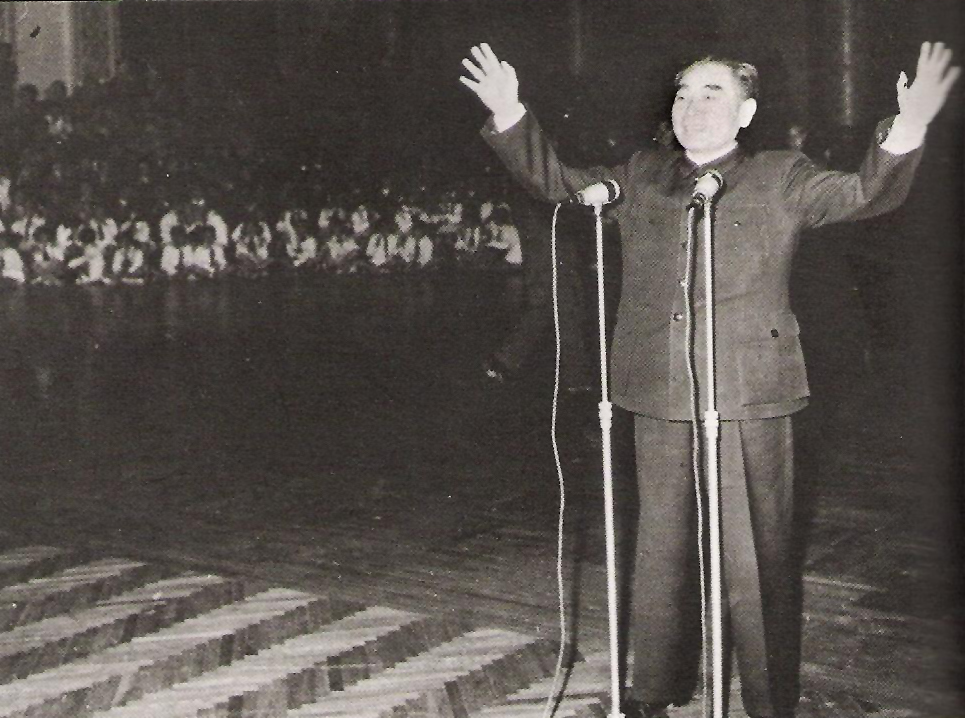
Zhou Enlai announcing the success of the test.

On the day, Premier Zhou Enlai published a statement by the Chinese government, announcing the test, and stating its purpose to "oppose the U.S. imperialist policy of nuclear blackmail". Specifically, China criticized the 1963 Partial Nuclear Test Ban Treaty, promulgated by the "nuclear monopoly" of the US, USSR, and UK, which aimed to ban all non-underground nuclear testing, including atmospheric tests such as 596. China also criticized the NATO Multilateral Force proposal in Europe, and "U.S. submarines carrying Polaris missiles with nuclear warheads ... prowling the Taiwan Straits, the Tonkin Gulf, the Mediterranean Sea, the Pacific Ocean, the Indian Ocean and the Atlantic Ocean".

This statement was also the first of any country to declare the nuclear doctrine of no first use, with officials characterizing the Chinese nuclear arsenal as a minimal deterrent to nuclear attack. The statement officially proposed a summit conference of nuclear nations and nuclear threshold nations, to reach an agreement to never use nuclear weapons (see also Treaty on the Prohibition of Nuclear Weapons). It concluded "We are convinced that nuclear weapons, which are after all created by man, certainly will be eliminated by man."

=== United States ===
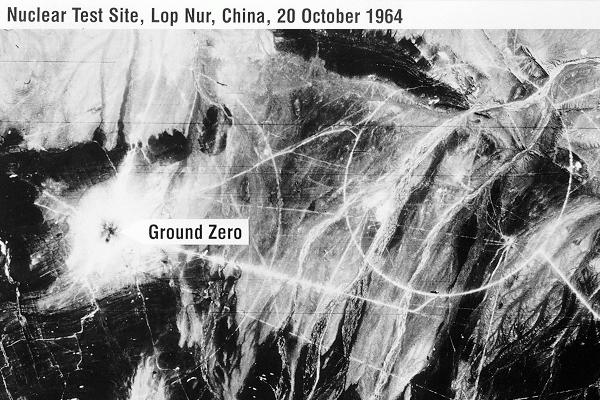
Satellite image of the Lop Nur test site taken by an American KH-4 Corona intelligence satellite on 20 October 1964, 4 days after the 596 test.

The United States government was aware of Soviet support of a Chinese nuclear program, but after the Soviets withdrew support in 1959, some U.S. officials underestimated the sole capability of China to develop a nuclear weapon, and were surprised when China's efforts proved successful. Namely, they thought there was an insufficient source for weapons-grade U-235 production and that the significance of a nuclear China was underplayed. Still, President Kennedy proposed preventive action but it was decided against by the U.S. government as it was "likely to be viewed as provocative and dangerous and will play into the hands of efforts by [Beijing] to picture U.S. hostility to Communist China as the source of tensions and the principal threat to the peace in Asia." By early 1964, from surveillance of activity around the Lop Nur site, it was clear that a test would be imminent.

The US detected the acoustic, electromagnetic, and atmospheric debris signatures of the test. The latter falsified their presumption that the first Chinese test would use plutonium, rather than uranium.

President Lyndon B. Johnson condemned the nuclear testing by China, calling it "a reflection of policies which do not serve the cause of peace".

=== Taiwan ===
In response to the 596 test, the Chinese Nationalist leadership in Taiwan, led by Chiang Kai-shek, called for a military response against Communist Chinese nuclear facilities and the formation of an anti-communist defense organization. However, the United States would not risk strikes in China. Taiwan tried to launch its own nuclear weapons program, but the U.S. pressured Taiwan to dismantle its nuclear weapons program as it would strain US-China relations. At the time of the test, Taipei was recognized as the seat of the Chinese government by the United States, and Chinese membership in the United Nations, including a permanent seat in the United Nations Security Council, was held by Taiwan. With a nuclear weapon in the hands of Beijing, the international community would have to shift its recognition to the mainland, which it did a decade later.

=== Soviet Union ===
Chinese nuclear capacity prompted the Soviet Union to sign the 1968 Treaty on the Non-Proliferation of Nuclear Weapons with the United States. In 1969, following the Battle of Zhenbao Island, the USSR considered a massive nuclear attack on China, targeting cities and nuclear facilities. It made military activity in the Russian Far East, and informed its allies and the United States of this potential attack. The Chinese government and archives were evacuated from Beijing while the People's Liberation Army scattered from its bases. According to a number of sources, the crisis abated when the US Nixon administration informed the Soviets an attack on China would be met by a US nuclear attack targeting 130 Soviet cities.

=== Japan ===
The Japanese government expressed "deep regret" for the testing. While the 1964 Summer Olympics which opened on 10 October was already underway in Tokyo, China conducted the atomic bomb test six days into the competition, prompting concerns of radiation fallout in Japan as it is relatively close to mainland China.

=== In the Third World ===
Diplomats across Asia, Africa, and in Cuba, spoke positively of the test, emphasising its counterbalancing effects for their continents against the existing superpower hegemonies of the Cold War. Indonesia stated that "not only white people can produce nuclear bombs", the Pakistani Foreign Ministry called it "the pride and glory of all Asians", a Ghanaian diplomat said "China's atomic bomb belongs to all the Asian and African peoples", and the Cuban ambassador said "China having atomic bombs is the same as us having atomic bombs". Other congratulations came from Afghan, North Vietnamese, and even Dutch diplomats.

== Aftermath ==
The next step for China was to develop the mode of delivery of a nuclear payload. Just seven months after the 596 test, a deliverable nuclear bomb was successfully dropped from a bomber and detonated. A year later, medium range missiles were fitted with nuclear warheads. The Lop Nur test site was used to develop more sophisticated nuclear weapons such as the hydrogen bomb, multi-stage thermonuclear devices, and Intercontinental Ballistic Missiles (ICBM). While China's nuclear arsenal was modest compared to that of the Soviet Union and the United States, the presence of another nuclear power in Asia raised the issue of uncontrolled proliferation. The USA took measures to forestall the independent development of nuclear capabilities in more Asian nations, most immediately with India, aiding the RAW-affiliated Aviation Research Centre with specialised equipment to spy on China's nuclear programme and naval assets. Top U.S. officials began open talks of non-proliferation with the Soviet Union soon after the 596 test to offset the possibility of a nuclear China propelling a larger and more unpredictable global arms race.

== Specifics ==
- Time: 15:00 CST (07:00 GMT), 16 October 1964
- Location: Lop Nur Test Ground, 40°48′45″N 89°47′24″E, about 70 km northwest of Lop Nor dry lake
- Test type and height: Tower, 102 meters
- Yield: 22 kilotons

== See also ==
- Two Bombs, One Satellite
- Project 639
- Nuclear weapons of China
- RDS-1
