= Zhao Jiuzhang =

Chinese scientist

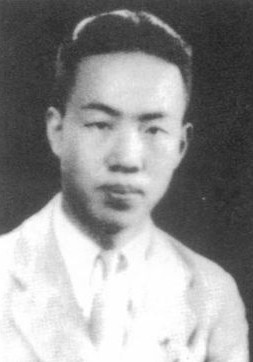
- Zhao in 1933
- Born: October 15, 1907; Kaifeng, Henan, Qing dynasty
- Died: October 26, 1968 (aged 61); Beijing, China
- Other name: Jeou Jang Jaw
- Education: Tsinghua University; Zhejiang University; Humboldt University of Berlin
- Scientific career
- Fields: Statistics
- Workplaces: National Southwestern Associated University; University of Science and Technology of China

Zhao Jiuzhang (simplified Chinese: 赵九章; traditional Chinese: 趙九章; pinyin: Zhào Jiǔzhāng; Wade–Giles: Chao Chiu-chang; 15 October 1907 – 26 October 1968), also known as Jeou Jang Jaw, was a Chinese meteorologist and physicist. He was a pioneer of Chinese space technology and is considered as a founding father of China's satellite program.

== Life ==
Born in Kaifeng, Henan Province on 15 October 1907. From 1925 to 1927, he studied electrical engineering at Zhejiang Industrial School (now Zhejiang University) in Hangzhou. He then transferred to Tsinghua University in Beijing. He graduated from the Department of Physics, Tsinghua in 1933. In 1935, he went to the University of Berlin; in 1938, he obtained his PhD.

He was a professor of Tsinghua University, National Central University (now Nanjing University), and National Southwestern Associated University.

During the Cultural Revolution, he was persecuted by the Red Guards and committed suicide in October 1968.

== Awards and honors ==
In 1999, Zhao was awarded the Two Bombs, One Satellite Achievement Medal.

== Membership & presidency ==
Academic

- Academician, Chinese Academy of Sciences, 1955 election
- Director, Institute of Meteorology, Academia Sinica
- Director, Institute of Geophysics, Chinese Academy of Sciences
- Director, Institute of Applied Geophysics, Chinese Academy of Science
- President, Chinese Academy of Satellite Designation
- President, Chinese Meteorological Society
- President, Chinese Geophysical Society

Political

- Member, Jiusan Society, 1951 election
- Member, Central Committee of the Jiu San Society.
- Member, Standing Committee of the National People's Congress, PRC
- Standing Committee Member, Chinese People's Political Consultative Conference,

== See also ==
- Dong Fang Hong I - the first satellite that China launched in 1970.
