= Eugen Piwowarsky =

German metallurgist (1891–1953)

Eugen Piwowarsky (10 November 1891 – 17 November 1953) was a German metallurgist.

Piwowarsky was born in Leschnitz (Polish: Leśnica), Prussian Silesia, and educated at the Technische Hochschule Breslau. He taught at RWTH Aachen, founding the Foundry Institute there, and died in Aachen.

== Selected works ==
- Hochwertiger Grauguss und die physikalisch-metallurgischen Grundlagen seiner Herstellung, 1929
