= Peng Huanwu =

Chinese physicist

Peng Huanwu (Chinese: 彭桓武; October 6, 1915 – February 28, 2007) was a Chinese physicist. He was a member of Chinese Academy of Sciences (CAS), and a leader of Chinese nuclear weaponry projects.

== Life and career ==
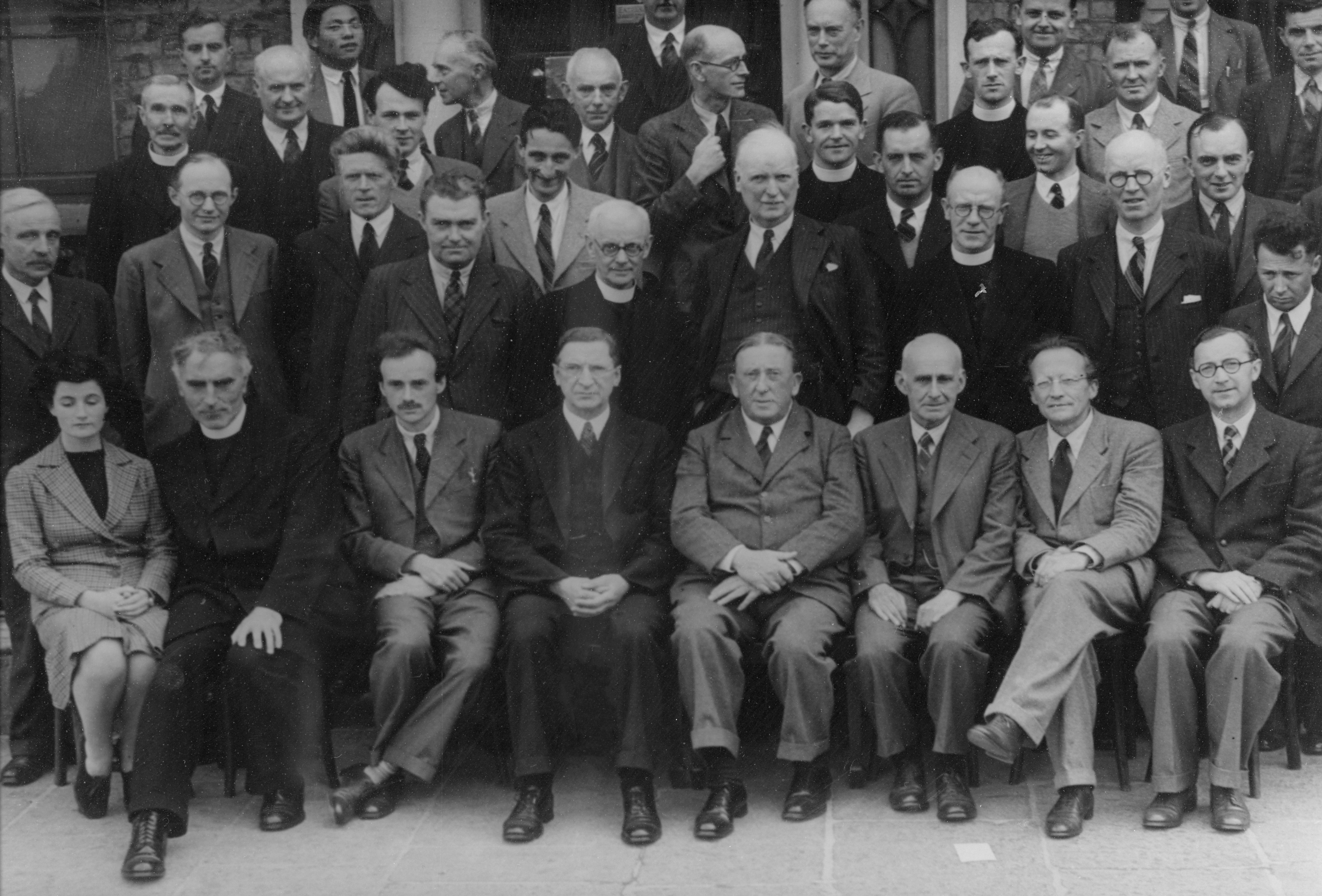
Peng (topmost row 2nd from left), with notable physicists, at Dublin Institute for Advanced Studies in 1942. Among others front row are 1st from left Sheila Tinney, 3rd Paul Dirac, then Éamon de Valera, and 7th Erwin Schrödinger

Peng was born in Changchun, Jilin Province; his father was from Macheng County, Hubei Province. After graduating from department of physics of Tsinghua University, Peng continued to pursue his postgraduate degree. After the outbreak of the Second Sino-Japanese War in July 1937, he went to teach at Yunnan University. In 1938, Peng was enrolled in foreign study program and went to study at University of Edinburgh in Scotland, and worked with prominent physicist Max Born. Peng was granted his PhD in 1940 and DSc in 1945.

Recommended by Born, Peng worked at Dublin Institute for Advanced Studies in Ireland as a postdoctoral scholar from 1941 to 1943 and later as an assistant professor from 1945 to 1947. While at DIAS Peng worked with another one of Born's students Sheila Tinney to produce important work on crystal lattices. From August 1941 to July 1943, Peng collaborated with Walter Heitler and James Hamilton to study cosmic ray, and developed HHP theory. Together with Born, Peng was awarded the Makdougall Brisbane Prize by the Royal Society of Edinburgh in 1945. He supervised Cécile DeWitt-Morette on the production of artificial mesons in 1946. He was elected as a member of Royal Irish Academy in 1948. In the same year he received a personal invitation from Ireland's Taoiseach, Éamon de Valera.

Peng returned to China in 1947, and taught at Yunnan University, Tsinghua University, Peking University and University of Science and Technology of China. He was involved in and led the development of China's atomic bomb and hydrogen bomb. He was the deputy director of the Institute of Atomic Energy, also known as Institute 401, in 1960 and became the deputy director of the Ninth Institute (now Chinese Academy of Engineering Physics) under the Second Ministry of Machine Building in April 1961. He served as vice director of Institute of Modern Physics of CAS, vice director of Institute of High Energy Physics of CAS, among other posts. From 1978 to 1983, he was the director of Institute of Theoretical Physics of CAS.

== Honours and recognition ==
Peng received numerous prestigious prizes in China including National Natural Science Prize and National Science and Technology Advancement Prize. In recognition of his contribution to China's nuclear physics, the asteroid #48798 was named after him as "Penghuanwu".

In 1999, Peng was awarded the Two Bombs, One Satellite Meritorious Medal.
