= Chen Nengkuan =

Chinese metallurgist and material scientist (1923–2016)

- 陈能宽
- Born: 28 April 1923; Cili, Hunan, China
- Died: 27 May 2016 (aged 93); Beijing, China
- Other name: N. K. Chen
- Education: Tangshan Jiaotong University; Yale University (PhD)
- Awards: Two Bombs and One Satellite Meritorious Award (1999)
- Scientific career
- Fields: Metallurgy; Detonation physics
- Thesis: Structural Studies of Plastic Deformation In Aluminum Single Crystals (1951)
- Doctoral advisor: C.H. Mathewson

Chen Nengkuan (Chinese: 陈能宽; pinyin: Chén Néngkuān; 28 April 1923 – 27 May 2016), or N. K. Chen, was a Chinese metallurgist and material scientist. He was an academician of the Chinese Academy of Sciences and one of the 23 founding fathers of China's Two Bombs, One Satellite (两弹一星元勋).

== Biography ==
Chen was born in Cili County, Hunan.

He graduated from the mining and metallurgy department of National Tangshan Jiaotong University (now Southwest Jiaotong University) in 1946. He was admitted to a self-financed study abroad program sponsored by the government and then traveled to the United States for graduate studies in 1947. He received a master's degree in 1948 and a Doctor of Philosophy in metallurgy from Yale University in 1950. He worked for Johns Hopkins University and Westinghouse Electric as a researcher after his graduation.

He returned to the People's Republic of China in 1955 after the Korean War ended and was assigned work at Institute of Applied Physics of Chinese Academy of Sciences. He was one of the key contributors to the Chinese nuclear weapon programs. Chen was elected as academician of Chinese Academy of Sciences in 1980. In 1999, he was awarded "Two Bombs and One Satellite Meritorious Award" for his contribution on atomic bomb and hydrogen bomb.

Chen died on 27 May 2016 at the age of 93 in Beijing.
