= List of nuclear weapons tests of China =

Chinese nuclear weapon tests
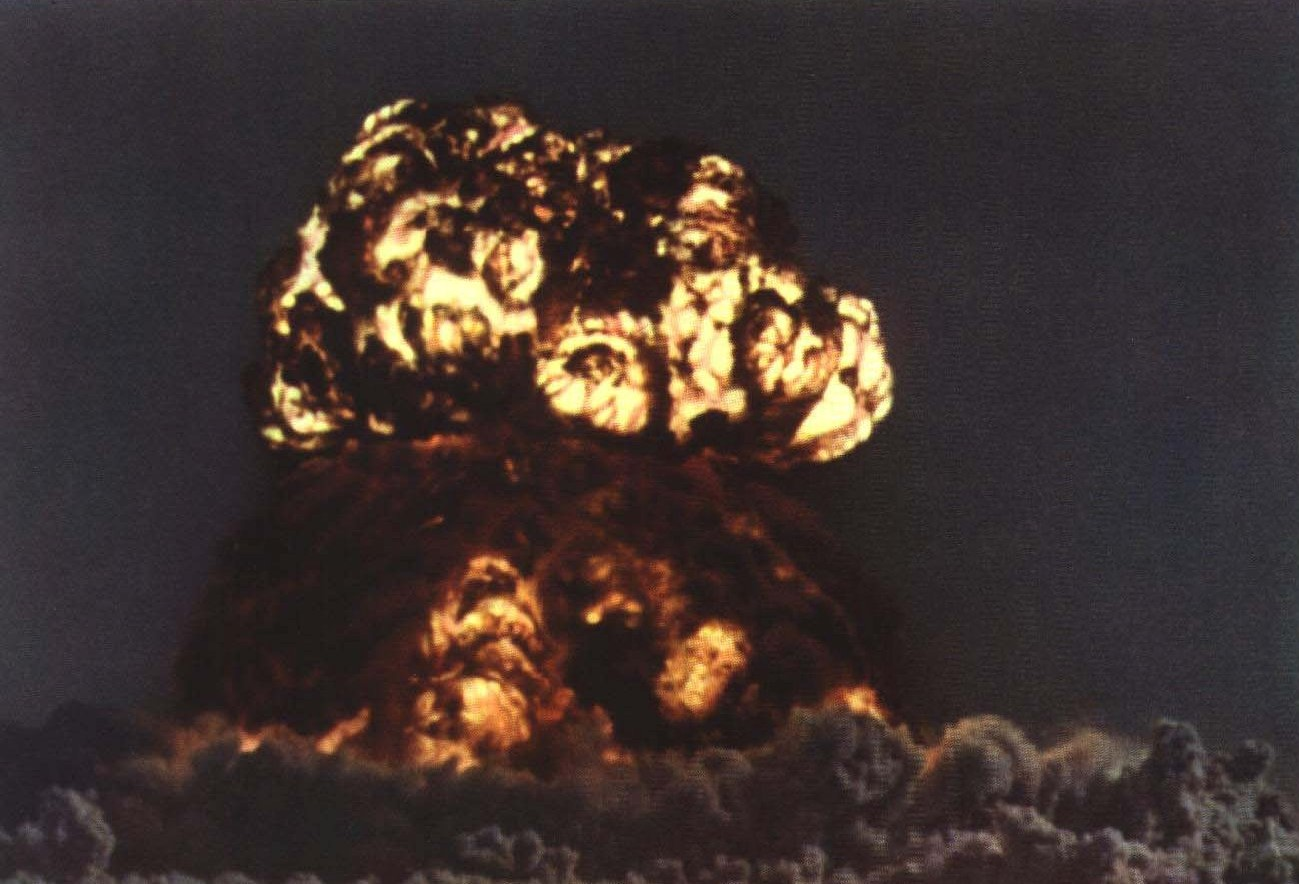
- Project 596 was the first ever Chinese nuclear explosion.

Information
- Country: China
- Test site: Area A (Nanshan), Lop Nur, China; Area B (Qinggir), Lop Nur, China; Area C (Beishan), Lop Nur, China; Area D (Drop Area), Lop Nur, China
- Period: 1964–1996
- Number of tests: 47
- Test type: air drop, atmospheric, cratering, high alt rocket (30–80 km), parachuted, tower, underground, underground shaft, tunnel
- Max. yield: 4 megatonnes of TNT (17 PJ)

The People's Republic of China conducted nuclear tests from 1964 to 1996. It is generally established that there were 45 tests involving 45 devices, with 23 being atmospheric. All tests were conducted in the remote location of Lop Nur, Xinjiang.

== List ==
China's nuclear test series tests and detonations
Name (Note: The US, France and Great Britain have code-named their test events, while the USSR and China did not, and therefore have only test numbers (with some exceptions – Soviet peaceful explosions were named). Word translations into English in parentheses unless the name is a proper noun. A dash followed by a number indicates a member of a salvo event. The US also sometimes named the individual explosions in such a salvo test, which results in "name1 – 1(with name2)". If test is canceled or aborted, then the row data like date and location discloses the intended plans, where known.)	Date time (UTC)	Location (Note: Rough place name and a latitude/longitude reference; for rocket-carried tests, the launch location is specified before the detonation location, if known. Some locations are extremely accurate; others (like airdrops and space blasts) may be quite inaccurate. "~" indicates a likely pro-forma rough location, shared with other tests in that same area.)	Elevation + height (Note: Elevation is the ground level at the point directly below the explosion relative to sea level; height is the additional distance added or subtracted by tower, balloon, shaft, tunnel, air drop or other contrivance. For rocket bursts the ground level is "N/A". In some cases it is not clear if the height is absolute or relative to ground, for example, Plumbbob/John. No number or units indicates the value is unknown, while "0" means zero. Sorting on this column is by elevation and height added together.)	Delivery, (Note: Atmospheric, airdrop, balloon, gun, cruise missile, rocket, surface, tower, and barge are all disallowed by the Partial Nuclear Test Ban Treaty. Sealed shaft and tunnel are underground, and remained useful under the PTBT. Intentional cratering tests are borderline; they occurred under the treaty, were sometimes protested, and generally overlooked if the test was declared to be a peaceful use.) Purpose (Note: Include weapons development, weapon effects, safety test, transport safety test, war, science, joint verification and industrial/peaceful, which may be further broken down.)	Device (Note: Designations for test items where known, "?" indicates some uncertainty about the preceding value, nicknames for particular devices in quotes. This category of information is often not officially disclosed.)	Yield (Note: Estimated energy yield in tons, kilotons, and megatons. A ton of TNT equivalent is defined as 4.184 gigajoules (1 gigacalorie).)	Fallout (Note: Radioactive emission to the atmosphere aside from prompt neutrons, where known. The measured species is only iodine-131 if mentioned, otherwise it is all species. No entry means unknown, probably none if underground and "all" if not; otherwise notation for whether measured on the site only or off the site, where known, and the measured amount of radioactivity released.)	References	Notes
596	16 October 1964 07:00:??	Area D (Drop Area), Lop Nur, China 40.81246°N 89.7901°E	807 m (2,648 ft) + 102 m (335 ft)	tower,	"596" or NGB	22 kt			China's first nuclear test. U-235 implosion fission device. UD_{3} neutron initiator. The device weighed 1,550 kg (3,420 lb). No plutonium was available at that time.
CHIC-2	14 May 1965 02:00:??, or 13 May 1965	Area D (Drop Area), Lop Nur, China ~ 41.5°N 88.5°E	807 m (2,648 ft) + 500 m (1,600 ft)	air drop,	NGB	35 kt			Militarized version of 596 dropped by Hong-6.
596L	9 May 1966 08:00:??	Area D (Drop Area), Lop Nur, China 40.7864°N 89.727°E	807 m (2,648 ft) +	air drop,	"596L"	250 kt			First use of lithium-6 in a sloika-like design. Said to have dropped on a 640 ft (200 m) white circle.
CHIC-4	27 October 1966 01:10:??	Launch from Jiuquan Satellite Launch Center, China 41.30782°N 100.31528°E, elv: 1,035 + 0 m (3,396 + 0 ft); Detonation over Area D (Drop Area), Lop Nur, China ~ 41.5°N 88.5°E	N/A + 569 m (1,867 ft)	high alt rocket (30–80 km), weapons development	Dongfeng-2 warhead "548"	12 kt			Delivery by CSS-1 MRBM Dong Feng-2 launched from Shuangchengzi Air Base, 894 km (556 mi) east of detonation.
629	28 December 1966 04:00:??	Area D (Drop Area), Lop Nur, China ~ 40.7989°N 89.8216°E	807 m (2,648 ft) + 102 m (335 ft)	tower,	"629"	122 kt			Two-stage thermonuclear bomb design. Design yield of 100 kt. Spherical fission primary based on 596 device. Spherical thermonuclear secondary with lead tamper.
639	17 June 1967 00:19:08.2	Area D (Drop Area), Lop Nur, China 40.744°N 89.775°E	807 m (2,648 ft) + 2,960 m (9,710 ft)	parachuted,	"639"	3.3 Mt			Two-stage thermonuclear modified from 629 device to full yield. Spherical fission primary. Spherical thermonuclear secondary with natural uranium tamper.
CHIC-7	24 December 1967 07:30:22.1	Area D (Drop Area), Lop Nur, China ~ 41.5°N 88.5°E	807 m (2,648 ft) +	air drop,		20 kt			Fizzled thermonuke. Recorded air burst. Erroneous reports exist that show a time of 04:00:00.
CHIC-8	27 December 1968 07:30:??	Area D (Drop Area), Lop Nur, China ~ 41.5°N 88.5°E	807 m (2,648 ft) +	air drop,	NGB/DF-3 warhead	3 Mt			First use of plutonium.
CHIC-9	22 September 1969 16:14:59.21	Area B (Qinggir), Lop Nur, China 41.376°N 88.318°E	1,440 m (4,720 ft) +	tunnel,		19.2 kt			Tunnel test in Nan Shan (South Mountain) that vented to surface.
CHIC-10	29 September 1969 08:40:12.36	Area D (Drop Area), Lop Nur, China 40.722°N 89.515°E	807 m (2,648 ft) +	air drop,	NGB/DF-3 warhead	3 Mt			
CHIC-11	14 October 1970 07:29:56.91	Area D (Drop Area), Lop Nur, China 40.52°N 89.779°E	807 m (2,648 ft) +	air drop,	NGB/DF-3 warhead	3.4 Mt			
CHIC-12	18 November 1971 06:00:??	Area D (Drop Area), Lop Nur, China ~ 41.5°N 88.5°E	807 m (2,648 ft) +	cratering,		20 kt			Only Chinese cratering test.
CHIC-13	7 January 1972 07:00:??	Area D (Drop Area), Lop Nur, China ~ 41.5°N 88.5°E	807 m (2,648 ft) +	air drop,	KB-1 tactical gravity bomb	8 kt			Air dropped from Qiang-5 attack jet. See story of launch:
CHIC-14	18 March 1972 06:00:??	Area D (Drop Area), Lop Nur, China ~ 41.5°N 88.5°E	807 m (2,648 ft) +	air drop,		170 kt			Fizzled thermonuke.
(15)	27 June 1973 03:59:46.29	Area D (Drop Area), Lop Nur, China 40.7985°N 89.8091°E	807 m (2,648 ft) +	air drop,	NGB/DF-3 warhead	3 Mt			High altitude explosion.
(16)	17 June 1974 05:59:52.72	Area D (Drop Area), Lop Nur, China 40.518°N 89.619°E	807 m (2,648 ft) +	atmospheric,	JL-1 missile warhead	1 Mt			
(17)	27 October 1975 00:59:58.23	Area B (Qinggir), Lop Nur, China 41.375°N 88.326°E	1,440 m (4,720 ft) +	tunnel,		2.5 kt			In a tunnel in Bei Shan (North Mountain).
(18)	23 January 1976 06:00:??	Area D (Drop Area), Lop Nur, China ~ 41.5°N 88.5°E	807 m (2,648 ft) +	atmospheric,		unknown yield			
(19)	26 September 1976 06:00:??	Area D (Drop Area), Lop Nur, China ~ 41.5°N 88.5°E	807 m (2,648 ft) +	atmospheric,	unknown device	200 kt			
(20)	17 October 1976 04:59:58.8	Area A (Nanshan), Lop Nur, China 41.716°N 88.3727°E	+	tunnel,		2.6 kt			
(21)	17 November 1976 06:00:12.7	Area D (Drop Area), Lop Nur, China 40.696°N 89.627°E	807 m (2,648 ft) +	air drop,	DF-5 warhead	4 Mt			Largest Chinese test.
(22)	17 September 1977 07:00:??	Area D (Drop Area), Lop Nur, China ~ 41.5°N 88.5°E	807 m (2,648 ft) +	atmospheric,		unknown yield			
(23)	15 March 1978 05:00:??	Area D (Drop Area), Lop Nur, China ~ 41.5°N 88.5°E	807 m (2,648 ft) +	atmospheric,		11 kt			
(24)	14 October 1978 00:59:58.01	Area C (Beishan), Lop Nur, China: N1 41.5398°N 88.767°E	1,689 m (5,541 ft) +	underground shaft,		3.4 kt			First test in a vertical shaft.
(25)	14 December 1978	Area D (Drop Area), Lop Nur, China ~ 41.5°N 88.5°E	807 m (2,648 ft) +	atmospheric,		unknown yield			
unnumbered failed test	2 February 1979	Area D (Drop Area), Lop Nur, China ~ 41.5°N 88.5°E	807 m (2,648 ft) +	underground,		1 kt			
(26) (aborted)	13 September 1979	Area D (Drop Area), Lop Nur, China ~ 41.5°N 88.5°E	807 m (2,648 ft) +	parachuted,		no yield			Parachute failure, bomb crashed without detonation.
(27)	16 October 1980 04:30:29.67	Area D (Drop Area), Lop Nur, China 40.719°N 89.651°E	807 m (2,648 ft) +	atmospheric,	JL-1 missile warhead	1 Mt			Last confirmed atmospheric test in the world.
(28)	5 October 1982	Area D (Drop Area), Lop Nur, China ~ 41.5°N 88.5°E	807 m (2,648 ft) +	underground,		7 kt			Attempted neutron bomb, fizzle.
(29)	4 May 1983 04:59:57.82	Area A (Nanshan), Lop Nur, China 41.7227°N 88.3653°E	+	tunnel,		1 kt			Second attempt for neutron bomb, failure.
(30)	6 October 1983 09:59:58.05	Area C (Beishan), Lop Nur, China: D1 41.54124°N 88.7207°E	1,689 m (5,541 ft) +	underground shaft,		unknown yield			Third neutron bomb attempt, failure.
(31)	3 October 1984 05:59:57.99	Area C (Beishan), Lop Nur, China 41.5709°N 88.7269°E	1,689 m (5,541 ft) +	underground shaft,		unknown yield			Fourth neutron bomb attempt, failure.
(32)	19 December 1984 05:59:58.34	Area A (Nanshan), Lop Nur, China 41.7167°N 88.3981°E	+	tunnel,		15 kt			Fifth neutron bomb test, successful.
(33)	5 June 1987 04:59:58.26	Area C (Beishan), Lop Nur, China: J1 41.55338°N 88.74093°E	1,689 m (5,541 ft) +	underground shaft,	Ballistic missile warhead?	250 kt			
(34)	29 September 1988 06:59:57.97	Area A (Nanshan), Lop Nur, China 41.725°N 88.3588°E	+	tunnel,	tactical ERW ?	3 kt			Final proof test of neutron bomb.
(35)	26 May 1990 07:59:57.94	Area C (Beishan), Lop Nur, China: C1 41.56476°N 88.71912°E	1,689 m (5,541 ft) +	underground shaft,	KRL derived CHIC-4 nuclear warhead design	12 kt			China tested a nuclear warhead design from Pakistan.
(36)	16 August 1990 04:59:57.7	Area C (Beishan), Lop Nur, China: M2 41.54298°N 88.73356°E	1,689 m (5,541 ft) +	underground shaft,	ballistic missile warhead?	189 kt			
(37)	21 May 1992 04:59:57.45	Area C (Beishan), Lop Nur, China: N2 41.5437°N 88.7641°E	1,689 m (5,541 ft) +	underground shaft,	DF-31/JL-2 missile warhead	660 kt			China's largest underground test.
(38)	25 September 1992 07:59:58.47	Area A (Nanshan), Lop Nur, China 41.7167°N 88.3767°E	+	tunnel,	experimental low yield device	8 kt			
unnumbered failed test	2 November 1992	Area D (Drop Area), Lop Nur, China ~ 41.5°N 88.5°E	807 m (2,648 ft) +	underground,		1 kt			Test of insensitive high explosives in primary.
(39)	5 October 1993 01:59:56.6	Area C (Beishan), Lop Nur, China: A2 41.59°N 88.70312°E	1,689 m (5,541 ft) +	underground shaft, safety experiment	DF-31 warhead	80 kt			Likely test of DF-31 warhead
(40)	10 June 1994 06:25:57.9	Area C (Beishan), Lop Nur, China: O1 41.5287°N 88.7122°E	1,689 m (5,541 ft) +	underground shaft,	DF-31 warhead	90 kt			Likely test of DF-31 warhead
(41)	7 October 1994 03:25:58.1	Area C (Beishan), Lop Nur, China: H1 41.5734°N 88.72084°E	1,689 m (5,541 ft) +	underground shaft, safety experiment	DF-31 warhead	90 kt			Likely test of DF-31 warhead.
(42)	15 May 1995 04:05:57.8	Area C (Beishan), Lop Nur, China: K1 41.5524°N 88.7524°E	1,689 m (5,541 ft) +	underground shaft, safety experiment	DF-31 warhead	95 kt			Likely test of DF-31 warhead.
(43)	17 August 1995 00:59:57.7	Area C (Beishan), Lop Nur, China: L1 41.53983°N 88.75255°E	1,689 m (5,541 ft) +	underground shaft, safety experiment	DF-31 warhead	90 kt			Prompted Japanese Diet to lodge a protest and freeze grants to China.
(44) - 1	8 June 1996 02:55:57.9	Area C (Beishan), Lop Nur, China: B1 41.5768°N 88.68729°E	1,689 m (5,541 ft) +	underground shaft,		50 kt			
(44) - 2	8 June 1996 02:55:57.9	Area C (Beishan), Lop Nur, China: B1 41.5768°N 88.68729°E	1,689 m (5,541 ft) +	underground shaft,		unknown yield			
(45)	29 July 1996 01:48:57.8	Area A (Nanshan), Lop Nur, China 41.7161°N 88.3757°E	+	tunnel,		3 kt			

== Summary ==
China's nuclear testing series summary - Link to world summary of nuclear weapons tests
Series or years	Years covered	Tests (Note: Includes all tests with potential for nuclear fission or fusion explosion, including combat use, singleton tests, salvo tests, zero yield fails, safety experiments, and bombs incapacitated by accidents but still intended to be fired. It does not include hydronuclear and subcritical tests, and misfires of a device which was subsequently fired successfully.)	Devices fired	Devices with unknown yield	Peaceful use tests	Non-PTBT tests (Note: Number of tests which would have been in violation of the Partial Test Ban Treaty of 1963, such as atmospheric, space or underwater tests. Some "peaceful use" cratering tests which should have been violations were protested, and later quietly dropped.)	Yield range (kilotons) (Note: "Small" refers to a value greater than zero but less than 0.5 kt.)	Total yield (kilotons) (Note: Some yields are described like "< 20 kt"; such are scored at one half of the numeric amount, i.e., yield of 10k in this example. "Unknown yield" adds nothing to the total.)	Notes
nuclear test	1964–1996	47	48	7		23	0 to 4,000	24,409	
Totals	1964-Oct-16 to 1996-Jul-29	47	48	7		23	0 to 4,000	24,409	Total country yield is 4.5% of all nuclear testing.

== See also ==
- Nuclear weapons of China
- Chinese space program
- China Academy of Engineering Physics
