= Second Ministry of Machine-Building Industry =

Former PRC Ministry Overseeing Nuclear

The Second Ministry of Machine-Building Industry (第二机械工业部) was a government ministry of the People's Republic of China which oversaw the nuclear industry of China.

In February 1958, China's Third Ministry of Machine Building (which had been established as the Third Ministry of Machine Building in November 1956 to oversee China's nuclear weapons program) was renamed the Second Ministry of Machine Building. It had a month earlier established the Ninth Bureau, which was responsible for nuclear weapons research and design.

In 1958, the National Defense Science and Technology Commission (NDSTC) was established with Marshal Nie Rongzhen as its director to oversee the Second Ministry of Machine Building as well as the Lop Nur Nuclear Weapon Test Base and the Fifth Academy of the Defense Ministry (which focused on missile programs).

In July 1958, the Second Ministry approved plans to set up a nuclear research institute on Huayuan Road in Beijing to receive and study technical assistance which the Soviet Union had promised (but mostly did not ultimately provide) under the New Defense Technical Accord.

In May 1982, the Second Ministry was renamed the Nuclear Industry Ministry. In 1988 the Ministry of Nuclear Industry was re-organised and became the China National Nuclear Corporation.

In April 1988, the Second Ministry became part of the newly (now former) created Ministry of Energy Resources.

== Bibliography ==
- Malcolm Lamb: Directory of officials and Organizations in China, ME Sharpe Inc. Armonk, NY, 2003, p. 1911 +, ISBN 0-7656-1020-5, Volume 1
- China's Economic System, Routledge Abingdon 2005, 594 p., ISBN 0-415-36147-8
