= Project 639 =

Sixth Chinese nuclear test, 1967

639
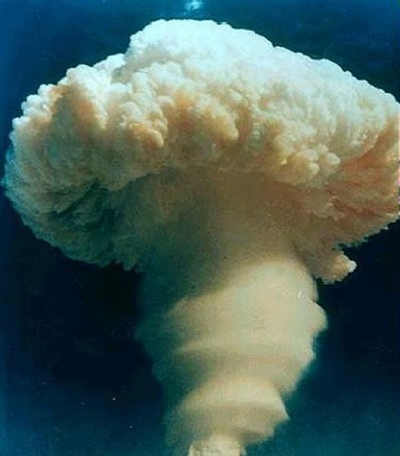
- The thermonuclear mushroom cloud, showing characteristic condesation rings

Information
- Country: China
- Test site: Lop Nur Test Base
- Period: June 17, 1967
- Number of tests: 1
- Test type: Atmospheric
- Device type: Two-stage thermonuclear bomb
- Max. yield: 3.3 megatons of TNT (14 PJ)

Test chronology

639 (CIA designation: CHIC-6) was the codename for China's first full-scale test of a two-staged thermonuclear device, on 17 June 1967, yielding 3.3 megatons of TNT. The sixth nuclear test carried out by the People's Republic of China, it was parachuted from a Xi'an H-6 bomber over the Lop Nur Nuclear Test Base in Xinjiang, detonating at a height of 3 km.

Chinese thermonuclear research began in 1961, during the early Sino-Soviet split and prior to the first Chinese nuclear test, 596, in 1964. Initial research by Peng Huanwu focused on a layer cake design test involving thermonuclear reactions; Chinese scientist had received limited information about the Soviet RDS-6s design. This was eventually tested as 596L in May 1966.

Theoretical development concluded a separate design was necessary for multi-megaton yields that had already been demonstrated by the United States, by the Soviet Union, and by the United Kingdom. A computational effort led by Yu Min developed by November 1965 a two-stage bomb, resembling the Teller-Ulam design but officially named the Yu Min configuration. China's first multistage thermonuclear device, codenamed 629, used this design in December 1966 at a demonstration yield of 122 kilotons.

The 639 device comprised a spherical primary, similar to the Project 596 device, and a spherical secondary with a shell of highly enriched uranium, produced in Lanzhou, and lithium deuteride, produced near Baotou. Unlike the US and USSR, at the time of their hydrogen bomb program, China operated no production facilities for plutonium or tritium.

The thermonuclear program's rapid success allowed it to avoid major delay or collapse during the decade-long Cultural Revolution, which began in 1966. In the months before the tests, scientists were spurred to achieve a multi-megaton thermonuclear test ahead of France, which achieved this in August 1968; China became the fourth nation to develop thermonuclear weapons. Detonated 32 months after 596, it remains the fastest progression from nuclear to megaton thermonuclear test of any country.

== Name ==
The origin of '639', referring to the thermonuclear device but not the test, is unclear. One weaponeer reported that it was from the year and month Nie Rongzhen ordered the Ninth Institute to begin hydrogen bomb development, while another who worked on calculations mentioned that the codename '629' for the demonstration test, was related device configuration.

The test was the sixth nuclear weapons tests by China, and the third that was dropped from an aircraft. The Second Ministry of Machine Building codenamed all nuclear tests beginning "21-", and all air-dropped nuclear tests as "21-7x", hence the codename for this test was 21-73. The Central Intelligence Agency designated this as CHIC-6, and all Chinese nuclear tests as CHIC-x, sequentially, short for CHICOM, a US shortening of "Chinese Communist" during the Cold War.

== Development ==
=== Background ===
The goal of China was to produce a thermonuclear device of at least a megaton in yield that could be dropped by an aircraft or carried by a ballistic missile. Several explosions to test thermonuclear weapon designs, characteristics and yield boosting preceded the thermonuclear test.

China was motivated to pursue nuclear weapons in part due to the First and Second Taiwan Strait Crises in 1955 and 1958. The United States had threatened nuclear attacks on the People's Liberation Army in each, and stationed nuclear weapons in Taiwan during and after the second crisis. The program officially began on 15 January 1955.

Liu Jie had participated in negotiations of a 1957 "New Defense Technical Accord" cooperation agreement with the Soviet Union, where they had agreed to supply a model nuclear weapon, specifically their layer cake design, tested as RDS-6s and RDS-27. Despite using thermonuclear reactions, this was not a true thermonuclear weapon. Liu pressed the Soviet side for details on hydrogen bombs, but realized the Soviets would not supply any details. China had received extensive technical help from the Soviet Union to jump-start their nuclear program. They assisted construction of a gaseous diffusion plant for highly enriched uranium at Lanzhou (Plant 504), and a lithium deuteride production plant at Baotou (Plant 212). In June 1958 the Soviet Union supplied a 10 MW heavy-water research reactor (HWRR-I) and a 25 MeV cyclotron to the Beijing-based China Institute of Atomic Energy. Unlike the US and USSR, at the time of their hydrogen bomb program, China operated no production facilities for plutonium or tritium. In June 1959, the rift between the Soviet Union and China had become so great that the Soviet Union ceased all assistance to China. In January 1961, limited thermonuclear weapons research began. The People's Republic of China detonated its first nuclear bomb, Project 596, in October 1964.

=== Thermonuclear weapons program ===
Thermonuclear research took place under Peng Huanwu. During 1963, the Soviet layer cake design, which Peng had at some point received limited information on, was extensively investigated as ultimately too inefficient to be reasonably scaled to the megaton range. In January 1964, a search for a new design began. Foreign magazine photographs were searched, showing existing thermonuclear missiles were generally long cylinders, indicating different physical principles from the spherical layer cake. In November 1964, Mao Zedong and Zhou Enlai pressured the thermonuclear researchers for a successful test within three years. In mid-1965, plans were made to carry out a small layer cake design test in 1966, and a backup project, "658", a three-staged layer-cake design capable of reaching one megaton, intended for a test on 1 October 1967. This concept was similar to the British backup design Orange Herald Large.

From September 1965, Yu Min, Cai Shaohui, and over 50 other researchers gathered in Shanghai, to focus on rapid theoretical development of the hydrogen bomb. Yu Min held a lecture series on the layer-cake bomb, and in doing so realized its flaw was its slow production of tritium from lithium deuteride i.e. the Jetter cycle. Work proceeded for almost 100 days, using both digital computers and manual calculation. During one simulation, a "light nuclear materials" (presumably lithium deuteride and its fusion products) value was mistakenly coded 20 times too large, and astonished the researchers with a three megaton yield. This allowed shifted the focus to methods of strong compression and density increase in the secondary.

In October, Yu and Cai decided to explore less physical but more ideal models for compression of the secondary. Yu subsequently devised a "sophisticated structure" to maximize one form of energy delivered to the secondary (presumably X-rays). From 1 November, simulations on the J501 computer showed that a one-megaton bomb was feasible with this design. From December, the decision was made to proceed with testing focused on this breakthrough. Yu later stated this rapid development prevented the hydrogen bomb research program from being delayed during the ten-year Cultural Revolution, which began in May 1966. Academic Hui Zhang speculated in 2024 that China's hydrogen bomb may never have materialized if it was delayed further.

In China this design has become known as the Yu Min configuration (于敏构型, Yú Mǐn gòu xíng). The Chinese government claims that although it is a multi-stage thermonuclear weapon design, it is distinct from the Teller-Ulam design assumed to be used by the other four thermonuclear nations, allowing further miniaturization, and that together these two comprise the only feasible thermonuclear weapon designs. The differences are unclear, as the Chinese design also channels energy from a nuclear fission primary to compress a thermonuclear secondary. Like the initial Soviet and British hydrogen bombs, the secondary is spherical, unlike the first cylindrical secondaries used in the US.

=== Thermonuclear testing ===
Despite a theoretically sound multi-stage thermonuclear weapon design, the Chinese government chose to first test the layer-cake design as China's third nuclear test. All testing occurred at Lop Nur salt lake. It was codenamed "596L", as it was based on China's first nuclear device, "596", a fission implosion bomb, but with an extra layer of lithium deuteride represented by the "L". The weapon was tested on 9 May 1966, dropped from a Xi'an H-6 bomber, and yielded approximately 220 kt. This yield is consistent with the similar Soviet RDS-27 test in their 1955 nuclear test series, which yielded 250 kt from a lithium deuteride layer cake design (RDS-6s achieved 400 kt via the addition of tritium).

Next, a small-scale test of the two-stage thermonuclear design was planned, codenamed "629". Development was obstructed by physics issues with the nuclear primary, and the outbreak of the Cultural Revolution in May 1966. A tower test was to be used for more precise measurements. To minimize fallout from ground contamination, a 50-meter circle was paved with concrete and a 230-meter radius circle with crushed stones. The device yield was also reduced by the use of less lithium deuteride and a lead tamper, designed for 100 kilotons. The test took place on 28 December 1966, yielding 122 kilotons, and validating the staged thermonuclear design. As a small-scale verification test, it was similar to the world's first thermonuclear test, the US Greenhouse George in May 1951.

Following the successful 629 test, full efforts were devoted to a full-scale hydrogen bomb test as "Test No. 6", codenamed "639". It was decided to cannibalize the materials from backup "658" layer cake project. In the fervor of the Cultural Revolution, the Ninth Academy eagerly competed against Peng Huanwu's prediction that France would test its first hydrogen bomb in 1967, and moved the speculative 639 test date from October to July.

== Test ==
The bomb, codenamed "639", was a larger version of the 629 device, a two-stage device with a boosted highly enriched uranium primary, but more lithium deuteride and a fast fissioning natural uranium tamper greatly enhancing the yield. The device weighed six tonnes, as opposed to the device of the 629 test, that weighed 1,500 kilograms (1.5 t).

The device was detonated at Lop Nur, in Bayingolin, Xinjiang, on 17 June 1967. It was dropped from a Xian H-6 (Chinese manufactured Tu-16) of the 36th Air Division and was parachute-retarded for an airburst at 2960 meters. The crew was scheduled to drop the weapon at 08:00 China Standard Time, but appeared to experience nervousness, failing to release the bomb when over the target. Beijing was immediately informed and Premier Zhou Enlai personally radioed the crew, telling them to remain calm. The bomb was dropped on the second attempt at 08:20.

With successful testing of this large two-stage thermonuclear device, China became the fourth country to have successfully developed a thermonuclear weapon after the United States, Soviet Union and the United Kingdom. The yield was 3.3 megatons.

The film of the prior 1966 tests have been released, as well as an unidentified later test.

It was a fully functional, full-scale, two-stage hydrogen bomb, tested just 32 months after China had made its first fission device. It remains to date the fastest of any country to successfully develop this capability.

== Aftermath ==
Following his death in 2019, Yu Min became the first deceased recipient of the Medal of the Republic, awarded by Xi Jinping and the Standing Committee of the National People's Congress.

== Gallery ==
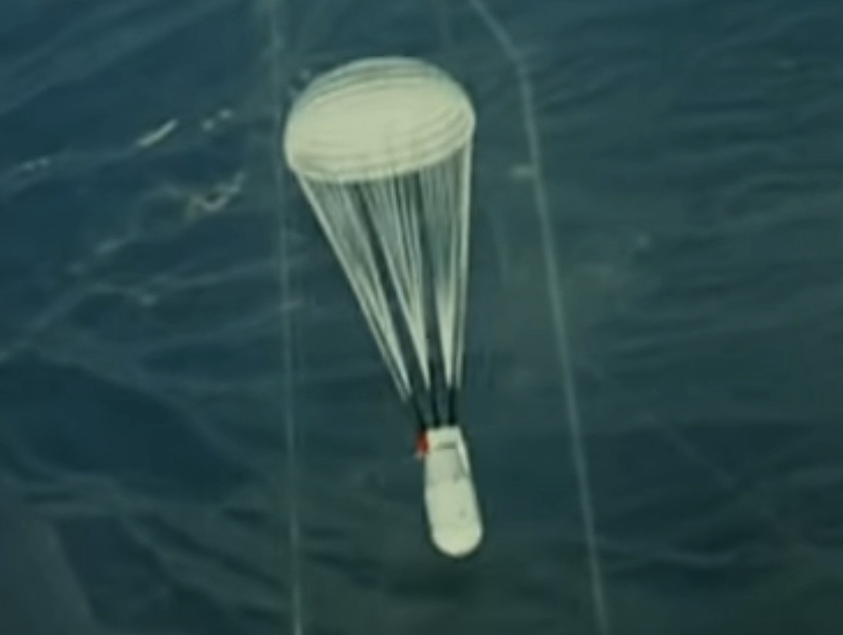

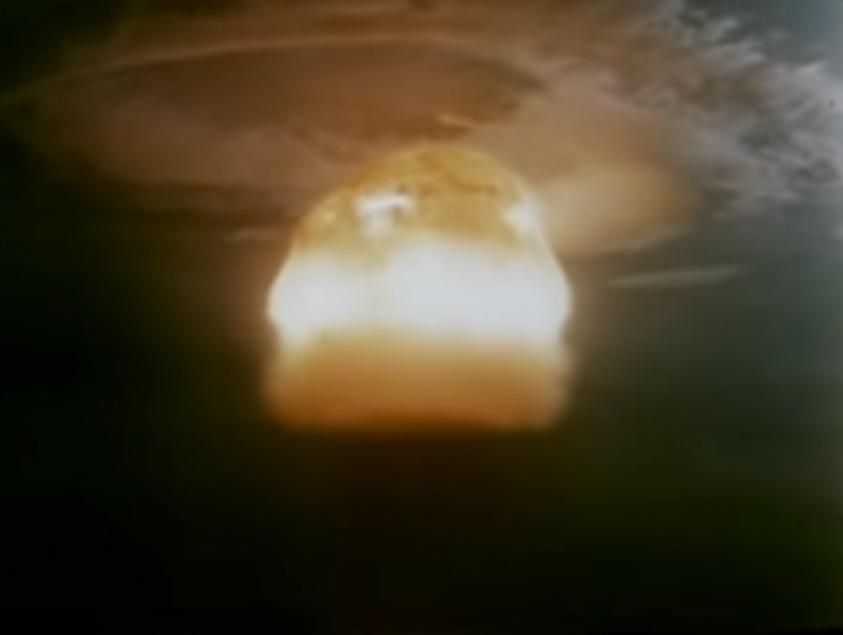

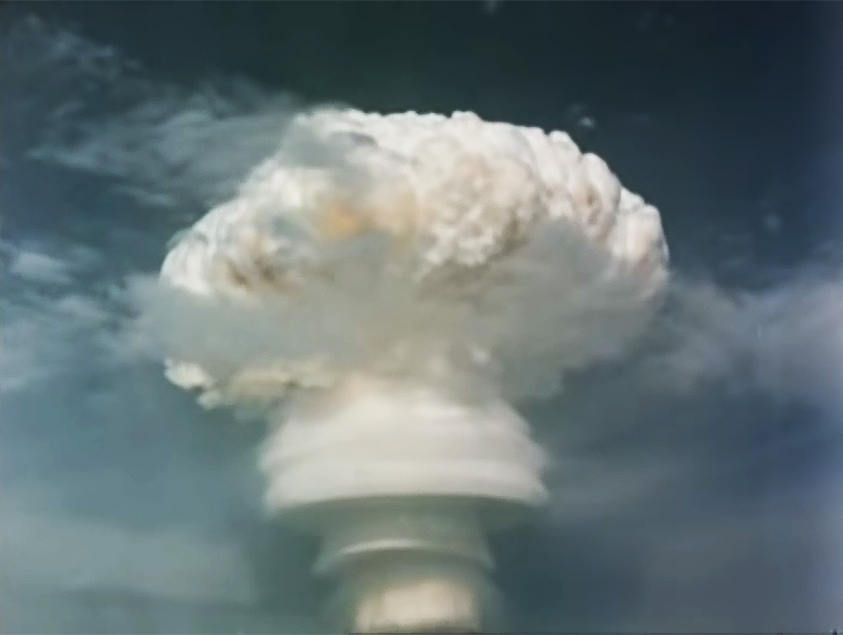

== See also ==
- Two Bombs, One Satellite
- 816 Nuclear Military Plant
- List of Chinese nuclear tests
- List of states with nuclear weapons
- Teller–Ulam design
