= Nuclear espionage =

Espionage related to the creation of nuclear weapons

Nuclear espionage is the purposeful giving of state secrets regarding nuclear weapons to other states without authorization (espionage). There have been many cases of known nuclear espionage throughout the history of nuclear weapons and many cases of suspected or alleged espionage. Because nuclear weapons are generally considered one of the most important of state secrets, all nations with nuclear weapons have strict restrictions against the giving of information relating to nuclear weapon design, stockpiles, delivery systems, and deployment. States are also limited in their ability to make public the information regarding nuclear weapons by non-proliferation agreements.

== Soviet spies in the Manhattan Project ==
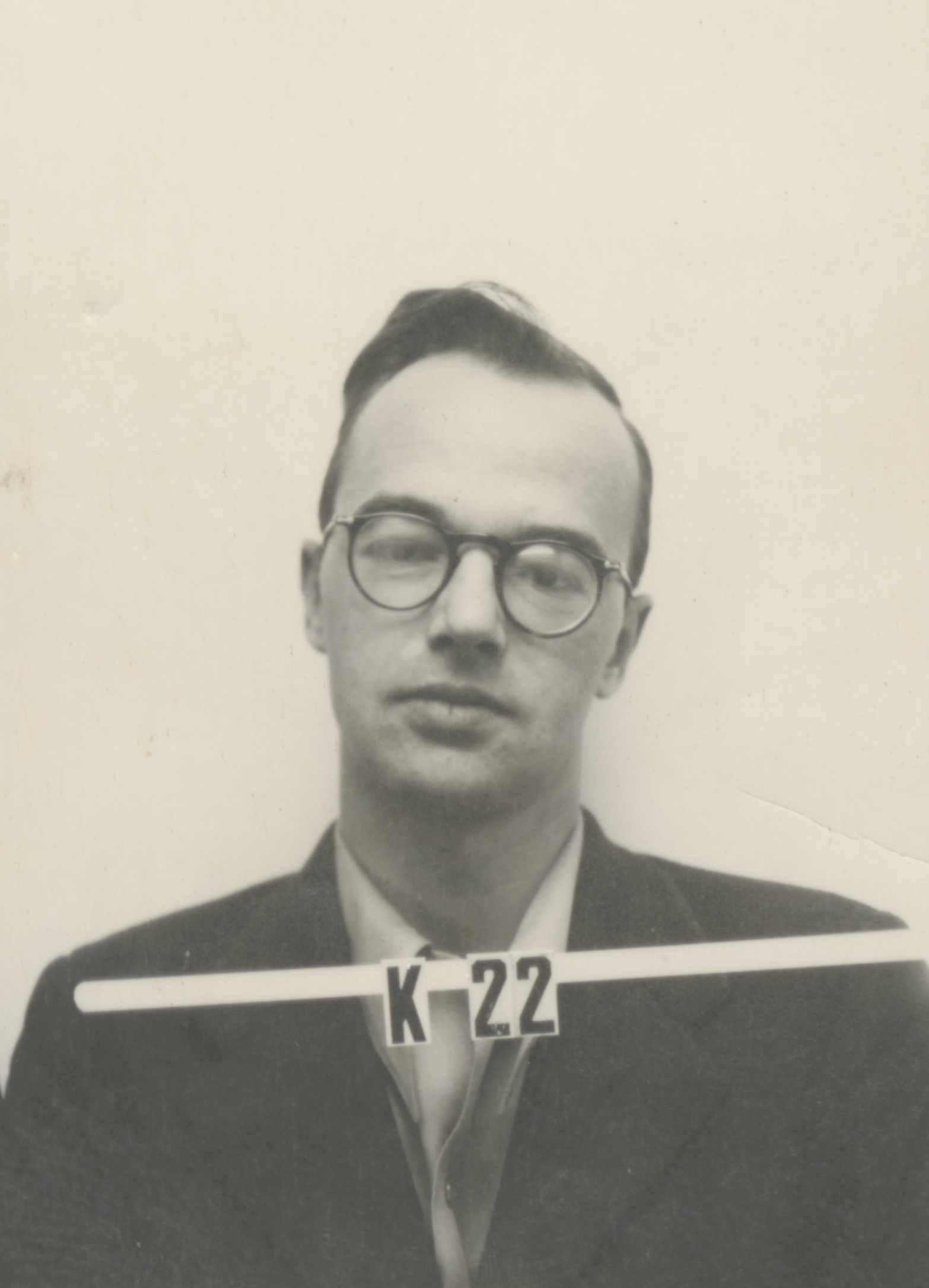
Klaus Fuchs is considered to have been the most valuable of the Atomic Spies during the Manhattan Project.

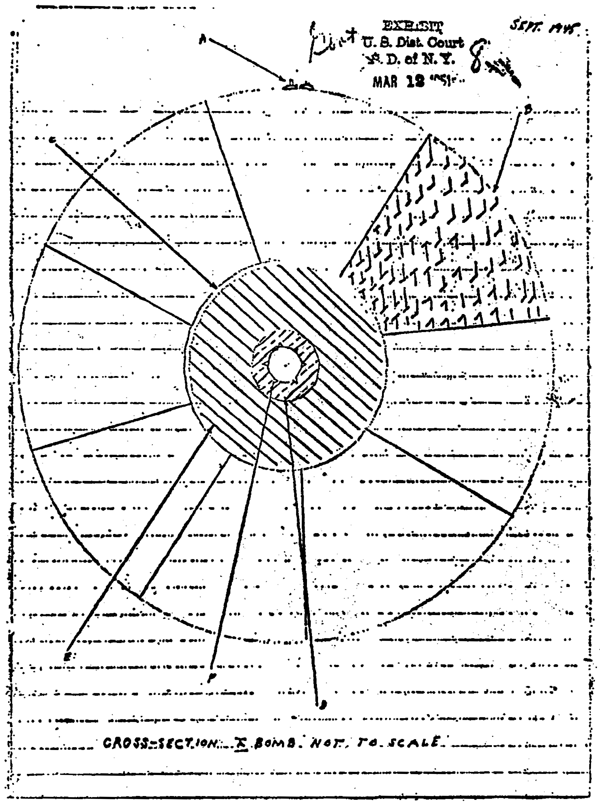
A drawing of an implosion nuclear weapon design by David Greenglass, illustrating what he supposedly gave the Rosenbergs to pass on to the Soviet Union.

During the Manhattan Project, the joint effort during World War II by the United States, the United Kingdom, and Canada to create the first nuclear weapons, there were many instances of nuclear espionage in which project scientists or technicians channeled information about bomb development and design to the Soviet Union. These people are often referred to as the Atomic Spies, and their work continued into the early Cold War. Because most of these cases became well known in the context of the anti-Communist 1950s, there has been long-standing dispute over the exact details of these cases, though some of this was settled with the making public of the Venona project transcripts, which were intercepted and decrypted messages between Soviet agents and the Soviet government. Some issues remain unsettled, however.

The most prominent of these included:

- Klaus Fuchs – German refugee theoretical physicist who worked with the British delegation at Los Alamos during the Manhattan Project. He was eventually discovered, confessed, and sentenced to jail in Britain. He was later released, and he emigrated to East Germany. Because of his close connection to many aspects of project activities, and his extensive technical knowledge, he is considered to have been the most valuable of the "Atomic Spies" in terms of the information he gave to the Soviet Union about the American fission bomb program. He also gave early information about the American hydrogen bomb program but since he was not present at the time that the successful Teller-Ulam design was discovered, his information on this is not known to have been of much value.
- Theodore Hall – a young American physicist at Los Alamos, whose identity as a spy was not revealed until very late in the 20th century. He gave implosion bomb details to a Soviet official at a U.S. Communist party meeting in New York. From then, he continued to give information about the hydrogen bomb to his Soviet contacts. He was never arrested in connection to his espionage work, though seems to have admitted to it in later years to reporters and to his family. Near the end of his life, he admitted that he abhorred the idea of the United States holding overwhelming power over the world's nuclear stockpile and believed all nations should have the same amount of atomic knowledge.
- David Greenglass – an American machinist at Los Alamos during the Manhattan Project. Greenglass confessed that he gave crude schematics of lab experiments to the Russians during World War II. Some aspects of his testimony against his sister and brother-in-law (the Rosenbergs, see below) are now thought to have been fabricated in an effort to keep his own wife from prosecution. Greenglass confessed to his espionage and was given a long prison term.
- George Koval – The American-born son of a Belarusian emigrant family that returned to the Soviet Union where he was inducted into the Red Army and recruited into the GRU intelligence service. He infiltrated the US Army and became a radiation health officer in the Special Engineering Detachment. Acting under the code name DELMAR he obtained information from Oak Ridge and the Dayton Project about the Urchin (detonator) used on the Fat Man plutonium bomb. His work was not known to the west until he was posthumously recognized as a hero of the Russian Federation by Vladimir Putin in 2007.
- Ethel and Julius Rosenberg – Americans who were supposedly involved in coordinating and recruiting an espionage network which included David Greenglass. While most scholars believe that Julius was likely involved in some sort of network, whether or not Ethel was involved or cognizant of the activities remains a matter of dispute. Julius and Ethel refused to confess to any charges, and were convicted and executed at Sing Sing Prison.
- Harry Gold – American, confessed to acting as a courier for Greenglass and Fuchs.

While the spies mentioned previously have become infamous for their actions, more Los Alamos spies have been identified in recent years due in part to the FBI releasing previously classified documents. Other spies have become more known after being overlooked by historians.

These include:

- Clarence Hiskey - American-born chemist who worked on the Manhattan Project's metallurgical division and was serving as a Soviet agent. While working on the Manhattan project, he provided several classified documents to the GRU intelligence service. Though Hiskey's contributions to the Soviet Union's development of its own nuclear bomb remain minimal compared to other early spies, he remains one of the first to leak information from Los Alamos. He was never convicted by the U.S. government due to a lack of solid evidence pertaining to his espionage.
- Arthur Adams - a Soviet spy born in Sweden with mixed Russian and Swedish heritage. He served as a courier for several Soviet spies during World War II, and was a GRU contact for Clarence Hiskey. Despite the fact he was not an American citizen, Adams was able to infiltrate the United States and convincingly faked his identity as a Canadian citizen. After successfully exporting many documents over the development of the U.S. atomic bomb, Adams fled back to the Soviet Union after several run-ins with the FBI.
- Oscar Seborer - an American electrical engineer assigned to work on the Manhattan Project within the Special Engineering Detachment. In 2020, five years after his death, historians Harvey Klehr and John Earl Hayes unearthed documents connecting Seborer to the previously known codename Godsend, who was part of a group of Los Alamos scientists spying for the Soviet Union. The quality of the information he leaked is unknown, due to the lack of documentation covering Seborer's time at Los Alamos.

Most Soviet spies were properly convicted, but several evaded indictment due to a lack of evidence. In the case of Arthur Adams, he was watched by the FBI for many years before his escape to the Soviet Union. The FBI had probable cause Adams was engaging in espionage, but critically lacked evidence to proceed against him. The same goes for his associate Clarence Hiskey who was able to live the rest of his life out in the United States even though he was questioned by the FBI several times. Oscar Seborer was the most prevalent case of this, with his involvement not being discovered until decades after his spy work. Documents will continue to be found and more information about these spies and other potential saboteurs will become public knowledge.

== Israel ==
In 1986, a former technician, Mordechai Vanunu, at the Israeli nuclear facility near Dimona revealed information about the Israeli nuclear weapon program to the British press, confirming widely held notions that Israel had an advanced and secretive nuclear weapons program and stockpile. Israel has never acknowledged or denied having a weapons program, and Vanunu was abducted and smuggled to Israel, where he was tried in camera and convicted of treason and espionage.

Whether Vanunu was truly involved in espionage, per se, is debated: Vanunu and his supporters claim that he should be regarded as a whistle-blower (someone who was exposing a secretive and illegal practice), while his opponents see him as a traitor and his divulgence of information as aiding enemies of the Israeli state. Vanunu did not immediately release his information and photos on leaving Israel, travelling for about a year before doing so. The politics of the case are hotly disputed.

=== Against France ===
Operation Plumbat was an Israeli covert operation in 1968 to steal yellowcake (processed uranium ore) to support the Israeli nuclear weapons program.

France stopped supplying Israel with uranium fuel for the Dimona nuclear reactor after the 1967 Arab-Israeli War. Numerous sources show that in 1968 Israel stole 200 tonnes of yellowcake from the Belgian mining company Union Minière, which shipped processed uranium mined in Shinkolobwe, in the present-day Haut-Katanga Province of Democratic Republic of the Congo, out of Antwerp to Genoa for a European front company by transferring the ore to another vessel at sea. This Mossad covert operation violated Euratom controls of nuclear materials. Israel used the yellowcake to develop its nuclear arsenal.

The name of Operation Plumbat is derived from the Latin "plumbum", meaning lead, and is a reference to the labeling of the drums used to transport the yellowcake.

=== Against Iran ===
==== Stuxnet ====
Stuxnet is a malicious computer worm first uncovered on 17 June 2010 and thought to have been in development since at least 2005. Stuxnet targets supervisory control and data acquisition (SCADA) systems and is believed to be responsible for causing substantial damage to the Iran nuclear program after it was first installed on a computer at the Natanz Nuclear Facility in 2009. Although neither the United States nor Israel has openly admitted responsibility, multiple independent news organizations claim Stuxnet to be a cyberweapon built jointly by the two countries in a collaborative effort known as Operation Olympic Games. The program, started during the Bush administration, was rapidly expanded within the first months of Barack Obama's presidency.

==== Assassinations of Iranian nuclear scientists ====
Since 2010, multiple Iranian nuclear scientists have been killed in foreign-linked assassinations. Five were killed from 2010 to 2020 by car bombings or shootings. Fereydoon Abbasi was among the scientists who survived an assassination attempt in 2010, an assassination that killed another nuclear scientist, Majid Shahriari. Abbasi was later killed on 13 June 2025 during Israeli strikes on the Iranian nuclear program.

==== Infiltration of Iranian nuclear archives ====
On 31 January 2018, fewer than two dozen Mossad agents infiltrated a secret warehouse in the Kahrizak District of southern Tehran (the capital city of Iran), and pilfered 100,000 documents, including paper records and computer files, documenting the nuclear weapons work of Iran's AMAD Project between 1999 and 2003. The trove was part of Iran's clandestine nuclear archive, and documented years of work on atomic weapons, warhead designs and production plans.

=== Against the United States ===
==== Alleged theft of highly enriched uranium ====
The Apollo affair or NUMEC affair was a 1965 incident in which a US company, NUMEC, in the Pittsburgh suburbs of Apollo and Parks Township, Pennsylvania, was investigated for losing 200–600 pounds (91–272 kg) of highly enriched uranium, with suspicions that it had gone to Israel's nuclear weapons program.

== China ==
Design information about the W88 warhead, a miniaturized variant of the Teller-Ulam design, was allegedly stolen by PRC agents.

In a 1999 report of the United States House of Representatives Select Committee on U.S. National Security and Military/Commercial Concerns with the People's Republic of China, chaired by Rep. Christopher Cox (known as the Cox Report), it was revealed that U.S. security agencies believed that there is ongoing nuclear espionage by the People's Republic of China (PRC) at U.S. nuclear weapons design laboratories, especially Los Alamos National Laboratory, Lawrence Livermore National Laboratory, Oak Ridge National Laboratory, and Sandia National Laboratories. According to the report, the PRC had "stolen classified information on all of the United States' most advanced thermonuclear warheads" since the 1970s, including the design of advanced miniaturized thermonuclear warheads such as the W88 (which can be used on MIRV weapons), the neutron bomb, and "weapons codes" which allow for computer simulations of nuclear testing (and allow the PRC to advance their weapon development without testing themselves). The United States was apparently unaware of this until 1995.

The investigations described in the report eventually led to the arrest of Wen Ho Lee, a scientist at Los Alamos, initially accused of giving weapons information to the PRC. The case against Lee eventually fell apart, however, and he was eventually charged only with mishandling of data. Other people and groups arrested or fined were scientist Peter Lee (no relation), who was arrested for allegedly giving submarine radar secrets to China, and Loral Space & Communications and Hughes Electronics who gave China missile secrets. No other arrests regarding the theft of the nuclear designs have been made. The issue was a considerable scandal at the time.

== Pakistan ==
From 1991 to 1993, during the Prime minister Benazir Bhutto's government, an operative directorate of the ISI's Joint Intelligence Miscellaneous (JIM), conducted highly successful operations in Soviet Union. This directorate successfully procured nuclear material while many operative were posted as the Defence attaché in the Embassy of Pakistan in Moscow; and concurrently obtaining other materials from Romania, Albania, Poland and the former Czechoslovakia.

In January 2004, Dr. Abdul Qadeer Khan confessed to selling restricted technology to Libya, Iran, and North Korea. According to his testimony and reports from intelligence agencies, he sold designs for gas centrifuges (used for uranium enrichment), and sold centrifuges themselves to these three countries. Khan had previously been indicated as having taken gas centrifuge designs from a uranium enrichment company in the Netherlands (URENCO) which he used to jump-start Pakistan's own nuclear weapons program. On February 5, 2004, the president of Pakistan, General Pervez Musharraf, announced that he had pardoned Khan. Pakistan's government claims they had no part in the espionage, but refuses to turn Khan over for questioning by the International Atomic Energy Agency.

== Iran ==
When looking at future nuclear espionage all fingers are pointed at Iran. Their aspirations for obtaining nuclear weapons dates back to the 1970s. Those aspirations only grew stronger in the 1980s when the Iran-Iraq war broke out. This led nuclear research to become a major priority not only at the governmental level, but also at the private level. Iran has stated that their reason for nuclear research is for solely nonmilitary purposes such as for agricultural, medical, and industrial advancements.

The world powers do not like the addition of more countries with the opportunity to create nuclear weapons. Due to this the world powers made deals with Iran which led to the halt of nuclear research in the 2010s. This did not last long before IAEA started to get test readings that showed Iran had enriched uranium over eighty percent. This is higher enrichment than the little boy bomb that was used at Hiroshima which was right at eighty percent. That let the world know that Iran had the capability to enrich to a level great enough to produce a working nuclear weapon. The other thing they would need is a working bomb designed which is easier to steal than to discover. This has been shown by the Soviet Union, China, and Pakistan.

The ways of committing espionage have multiplied with the increase dependence on technology. This venerability is where a nation like Iran can benefit. They have one of the world's best cyber arsenals, and it only continues to grow. This allows them to perform cyberattacks much like North Korea has done to either gain access to nuclear weapon plans or get them as ransom. The United States and Israel would both be likely targets of a cyber espionage attack by Iran due to their previous attack on Iran. The attack by the United States and Israel was a malware called Stuxnet that was sold to Iran which eventually caused severe damage to their nuclear program There are other reasons it is believed that Iran may use cyberattacks to acquire the missing link to their nuclear weapons development. That is because they have used cyberattacks before even on the United States with regard to the attack on JPMorgan. This attack was linked to seven Iranians by the United States Justice Department. This new era of technology gives places like Iran the opportunity to retaliate. The most dangerous way they can retaliate is to commit espionage to acquire working nuclear weapon designs. This will most likely lead to an increase in nuclear weapons research in surrounding countries. That is dangerous because of the religious disagreements in the area between the Sunni (Egypt) and Shia (Iran) Muslims.

This new cyber aspect of espionage has led to efforts by nuclear-weapon-holding countries to scour their systems to find vulnerabilities. Some countries have started putting money into cyber defense programs, such as the United Kingdom, which has annually put two billion dollars toward a cyber defense system in an attempt to keep its assets protected. Espionage has become easier with a new route to gain access to private information. It has also become harder to prevent.

== India ==
India's path to become a nuclear power began with successful nuclear detonation during the operation known as Smiling Buddha in 1974. The official name for the project was Pokhran-I. It wasn't until May 13, 1998, that Pokhran-II, the next major development of India's nuclear weapons program, was detonated. It consisted of one fusion bomb and four fission bombs. This led then Prime Minister Atal Bihari Vajpayee to officially declare India as a nuclear power. However, India was involved in the nuclear dealings of the world much sooner than this.

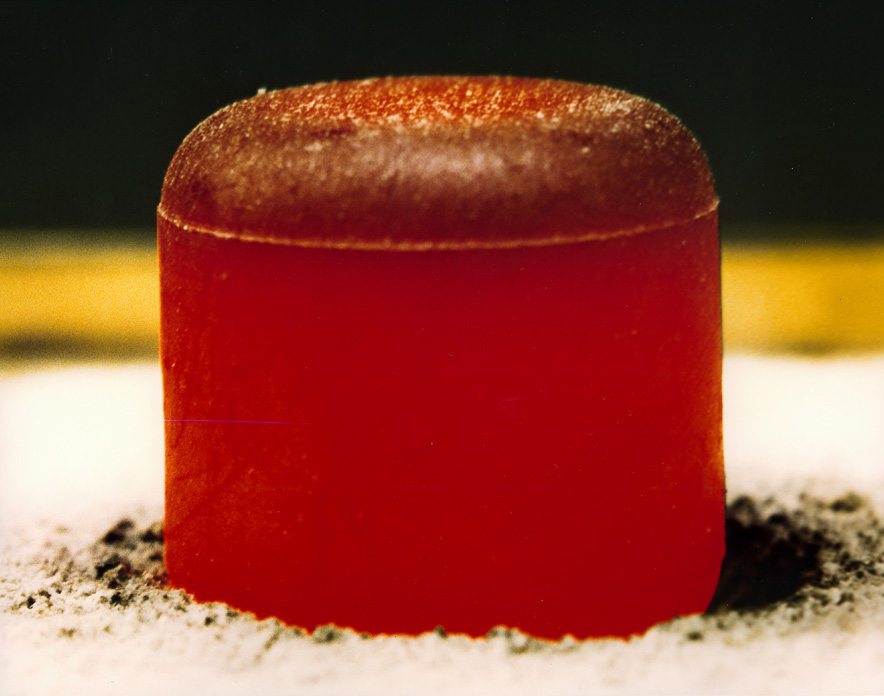
A Pu-238 Pellet, like those used in Radioisotope Thermoelectric Generators (RTG)

India was involved with assisting espionage between the United States and China in October 1965. The CIA enlisted 14 American climbers to scale Nanda Devi and working in cooperation with the Indian Intelligence Bureau, successfully planned the Nanda Devi Plutonium Mission. The objective of the mission was for the 14 climbers to work in unison to place a Radioisotope Thermoelectric Generator (RTG), powering a detector on the peak of Nanda Devi, thus allowing the U.S. to spy on China. More specifically, the Xinjiang Province. This was due to the lack of intelligence that the U.S. had on Chinese nuclear capacities during the Vietnam War. Ultimately, the mission failed due to one of the generators being lost during a snowstorm. However, this failed mission has had lasting impact on the region. Snow from the mountain carries into the Ganges, a crucial river for the survival and daily lives of millions of people that live in this region. It is thought that the generator was carried down the mountain by an avalanche. The river also has significant religious and spiritual importance to Hindus, who worship the river as Ganga. The CIA, knowing about the radioactive material being lost, sent climbers back to the area to search for the generator in 1966. This attempt was unsuccessful. In 1967 a new generator was sent with the climbers and was placed atop the peak of Nanda Kot. This mission was a success, and the U.S. was able to spy on the Chinese region.

On October 30, 2019, the Nuclear Power Corporation of India (NPCIL) made an official announcement that the Kudankulam Nuclear Power Plant in Tamil Nadu was the victim of a cyberattack. The attack happened earlier that year in September, but the NPCIL was hesitant to go public with the news, stating that a cyberattack on the facility was not possible. Only a single computer was attacked by the perpetrator. It's not clear what information was stolen at the time, but top officials related to the incident are not convinced that future attacks will be prevented. Speculation about the perpetrator has been discussed, specifically about what type of malware was used to hack into the system. The malware, known as "Dtrack", has similarities to attacks from North Korea. This makes them a possible target, especially with their past of other malware attacks.

== United States ==
=== CIA designations for nuclear tests ===
The CIA designated foreign nuclear tests with codenames "JOE-x" for sequentially detected Soviet tests and "CHIC-x" for Chinese tests. The following are names of notable tests:

CIA designations of notable nuclear tests
Historical name	CIA designation	Country
RDS-1	JOE-1	Soviet Union
RDS-6s	JOE-4	Soviet Union
RDS-4	JOE-5	Soviet Union
RDS-27	JOE-18	Soviet Union
RDS-37	JOE-19	Soviet Union
Tsar Bomba	JOE-111	Soviet Union
Project 596	CHIC-1	China
Project 596L	CHIC-3	China
Project 639	CHIC-6	China
Kuangbiao-1	CHIC-13	China
Operation 21-716	CHIC-27	China

=== Raising of Soviet submarine ===
On 8 August 1974, the Central Intelligence Agency's Project Azorian obtained Soviet nuclear weapons in the form of nuclear torpedoes, from the sunken wreck of the Soviet submarine K-129 (1960). However, the raising ship Glomar Explorer lost the submarine's section containing the R-13 ballistic missiles and nuclear warheads, codebooks and decoding machines.

=== Against China ===
==== Via India ====
India–United States espionage on Nanda Devi was a series of attempts by the United States Central Intelligence Agency (CIA) and the Indian Intelligence Bureau (IB) to spy on ballistic missile testing being conducted at Lop Nur in Xinjiang, China. The agencies cooperated in October 1965 in a failed attempt to install a SNAP-19C plutonium-238 radioisotope thermoelectric generator-powered (RTG-powered) remote sensing station on the peak of Nanda Devi in the Garhwal Himalayas to gather signals intelligence via telemetry from missiles during their tests.

The mission was aborted during a strong blizzard, and the generator was lost. Three recovery attempts failed, leading to fears of radioactive contamination of the Ganges or repurposing for a dirty bomb. Another CIA RTG-powered mountaintop device installed from spring 1967 to 1968 melted down into the ice, blocking its signal-gathering. A third device was successful from 1973 but quickly made obsolete by reconnaissance satellites.

==== Via the Republic of China ====
After China conducted its third nuclear test, Project 596L, in May 1966, the United States was eager to obtain information on the Chinese nuclear program. A CIA program, code named Tabasco, developed a sensor pod that could be dropped into the Taklamakan Desert, near Lop Nur nuclear test site. The pod would deploy an antenna after landing and radio back data to US SIGINT at Shu Lin Kou Air Station in Taiwan. After a year of testing, the pod was ready. Two pilots of the Black Cat Squadron were trained in the dropping of the pod. On 7 May 1967, a ROCAF U-2 took off from Takhli Royal Thai Air Force Base with a sensor pod under each wing. The aircraft released the pods at the target, near Lop Nur, but no data were received. China conducted its first full-scale thermonuclear test Project 639 on 17 June 1967. Black Cat Squadron flew a second U-2 mission near Lop Nur on 31 August 1967, carrying a recorder and an interrogator to contact the pods, but was unsuccessful.

This was followed by operation Heavy Tea of the Republic of China Air Force's Black Bat Squadron. The CIA again planned to deploy two sensor pallets to monitor Lop Nur. A crew was trained in the US to fly the C-130 Hercules. The crew of 12 took off from Takhli Royal Thai Air Force Base in an unmarked USAF C-130E on 17 May 1969. Flying for thirteen at low altitude in the dark, the sensor pallets were dropped by parachute near Anxi in Gansu province, and the aircraft returned to Takhli. The sensors uploaded data to a US intelligence satellite for six months, before their batteries died. China conducted two nuclear tests, on 22 September 1969 and 29 September 1969 in this period. Another mission to the area was planned as operation Golden Whip, but was called off in 1970.

== See also ==
- Atomic spies
- Soviet espionage in the United States
