= Radiation implosion =

Compression due to electromagnetic radiation

Radiation implosion is the compression of a target by the use of high levels of electromagnetic radiation. The major use for this technology is in fusion bombs and inertial confinement fusion research.

== History ==
Radiation implosion was first developed by Klaus Fuchs and John von Neumann in the United States, as part of their work on the original "Classical Super" hydrogen-bomb design. Their work resulted in a secret patent filed in 1946, and later given to the USSR by Fuchs as part of his nuclear espionage. However, their scheme was not the same as used in the final hydrogen-bomb design, and neither the American nor the Soviet programs were able to make use of it directly in developing the hydrogen bomb (its value would become apparent only after the fact). A modified version of the Fuchs-von Neumann scheme was incorporated into the "George" shot of Operation Greenhouse.

In 1951, Stanislaw Ulam had the idea to use hydrodynamic shock of a fission weapon to compress more fissionable material to extremely high densities in order to make megaton-range, two-stage fission bombs. He then realized that this approach might be useful for starting a thermonuclear reaction. He presented the idea to Edward Teller, who realized that radiation compression would be both faster and more efficient than mechanical shock. This combination of ideas, along with a fission "spark plug" embedded inside the fusion fuel, became what is known as the Teller–Ulam design for the hydrogen bomb.

== Fission bomb radiation source ==
Most of the energy released by a fission bomb is in the form of x-rays. The spectrum is approximately that of a black body at a temperature of 50,000,000 kelvins (a little more than three times the temperature of the Sun's core). The amplitude can be modeled as a trapezoidal pulse with a one microsecond rise time, one microsecond plateau, and one microsecond fall time. For a 30 kiloton fission bomb, the total x-ray output would be 100 terajoules (more than 70% of the total yield).

== Radiation transport ==
In a Teller-Ulam bomb, the object to be imploded is called the "secondary". It contains fusion material, such as lithium deuteride, and its outer layers are a material which is opaque to x-rays, such as lead or uranium-238.

In order to get the x-rays from the surface of the primary, the fission bomb, to the surface of the secondary, a system of "x-ray reflectors" is used.

The reflector is typically a cylinder made of a material such as uranium. The primary is located at one end of the cylinder and the secondary is located at the other end. The interior of the cylinder is commonly filled with a foam which is mostly transparent to x-rays, such as polystyrene.

The term reflector is misleading, since it gives the reader an idea that the device works like a mirror. Some of the x-rays are diffused or scattered, but the majority of the energy transport happens by a two-step process: the x-ray reflector is heated to a high temperature by the flux from the primary, and then it emits x-rays which travel to the secondary. Various classified methods are used to improve the performance of the reflection process.

Some Chinese documents show that Chinese scientists used a different method to achieve radiation implosion. According to these documents, an X-ray lens, not a reflector, was used to transfer the energy from primary to secondary during the making of the first Chinese H-bomb.

== The implosion process in nuclear weapons ==
The term "radiation implosion" suggests that the secondary is crushed by radiation pressure, and calculations show that while this pressure is very large, the pressure of the materials vaporized by the radiation is much larger. The outer layers of the secondary become so hot that they vaporize and fly off the surface at high speeds. The recoil from this surface layer ejection produces pressures which are an order of magnitude stronger than the simple radiation pressure. The so-called radiation implosion in thermonuclear weapons is therefore thought to be a radiation-powered ablation-driven implosion.

== Laser radiation implosions ==
There has been much interest in the use of large lasers to ignite small amounts of fusion material. This process is known as inertial confinement fusion (ICF). As part of that research, much information on radiation implosion technology has been declassified.

When using optical lasers, there is a distinction made between "direct drive" and "indirect drive" systems. In a direct drive system, the laser beam(s) are directed onto the target, and the rise time of the laser system determines what kind of compression profile will be achieved.

In an indirect drive system, the target is surrounded by a shell (called a Hohlraum) of some intermediate-Z material, such as selenium. The laser heats this shell to a temperature such that it emits x-rays, and these x-rays are then transported onto the fusion target. Indirect drive has various advantages, including better control over the spectrum of the radiation, smaller system size (the secondary radiation typically has a wavelength 100 times smaller than the driver laser), and more precise control over the compression profile.
