= Thermonuclear weapon =

Multi-stage fusion-fission nuclear weapon

Diagram of the US W88 warhead, a standard thermonuclear design.: 1. The "primary": a fission weapon that triggers the secondary; 2. The "secondary": fission and fusion fuel imploded by radiation; 3. Radiation case: Channels x-ray radiation from primary to secondary.; 4. Channel filler: Plastic foam that improves radiation implosion; 5. Booster gas canister: Periodic replacement as tritium gas decays.; 1. High-explosive lenses; 2. Plutonium-239 hollow pit; 3. Deuterium and tritium boosting gas; 4. lithium deuteride thermonuclear fuel; 5. Highly enriched uranium sparkplug; 6. Highly enriched uranium tamper; 7. Natural uranium case

Castle Bravo thermonuclear test, Bikini Atoll, 1954, the largest US nuclear test ever.

A thermonuclear weapon, fusion weapon, or hydrogen bomb (H-bomb) is a second-generation nuclear weapon, using nuclear fusion. The most destructive weapons ever created, their yields typically exceed first-generation nuclear weapons by twenty times, with far lower mass and volume requirements. Characteristics of fusion reactions can make possible the use of non-fissile depleted uranium as the weapon's main fuel, thus allowing more efficient use of scarce fissile material. Its multi-stage design is distinct from the usage of fusion in simpler boosted fission weapons. The first full-scale (Note: The first test of any thermonuclear design was the 1951 Greenhouse George explosion) thermonuclear test (Ivy Mike) was carried out by the United States in 1952, and the concept has since been employed by at least the five NPT-recognized nuclear-weapon states: the United States, Russia, the United Kingdom, China, and France.

The design of all thermonuclear weapons is believed to be the Teller–Ulam configuration. This relies on radiation implosion, in which X-rays from detonation of the primary stage, a fission bomb, are channelled to compress a separate fusion secondary stage containing thermonuclear fuel, primarily lithium-6 deuteride. During detonation, neutrons convert lithium-6 to helium-4 plus tritium. The heavy isotopes of hydrogen, deuterium and tritium, then undergo a reaction that releases energy and neutrons. For this reason, thermonuclear weapons are often colloquially called hydrogen bombs or H-bombs. (Note: The misleading term hydrogen bomb was already in wide public use before fission product fallout from the Castle Bravo test in 1954 revealed the extent to which most designs primarily rely on fast fission.)

Additionally, most weapons use a natural or depleted uranium tamper and case. This undergoes fast fission from fast fusion neutrons and is the main contribution to the total yield and radioactive fission product fallout.

Thermonuclear weapons were thought possible in 1941 and were the subject of basic research during the Manhattan Project. The first Soviet nuclear test triggered an all-out pursuit of a thermonuclear weapon in the US, despite initial opposition by many former Manhattan Project scientists. The Teller-Ulam configuration, named for its chief contributors, Edward Teller and Stanisław Ulam, was outlined in 1951, with contribution from John von Neumann. Operation Greenhouse investigated thermonuclear reactions before the full-scale Mike test.

Multi-stage devices were later developed and tested, largely independently, (Note: Rudimentary theory and designs were transferred between US and UK scientists during the Manhattan Project, from the US to the USSR via atomic spies, and from the USSR to China until 1960. The UK provided very limited information to France in 1967. See Thermonuclear weapon § History.) by the Soviet Union (1955), the United Kingdom (1957), China (1966), and France (1968). There is not enough public information to determine whether India, Israel, or North Korea possess multi-stage weapons. Pakistan is not considered to have developed them. After the 1991 collapse of the Soviet Union, Ukraine, Belarus, and Kazakhstan became the first and only countries to relinquish their thermonuclear weapons, although these had never left the operational control of Russian forces. Following the 1996 Comprehensive Nuclear-Test-Ban Treaty, most countries with thermonuclear weapons maintain their stockpiles and expertise using computer simulations, hydrodynamic testing, warhead surveillance, and inertial confinement fusion experiments.

Thermonuclear weapons are the only artificial source of explosions above one megaton TNT. The Tsar Bomba was the most powerful bomb ever detonated at 50 megatons of TNT (210 PJ), despite the uranium tamper being replaced with lead to reduce radioactive fallout. As they are the most efficient design for yields above 50 kilotons of TNT (210 TJ), and with decreased relevance of tactical nuclear weapons, virtually all nuclear weapons deployed by the five recognized nuclear-weapons states today are thermonuclear. Their development dominated the Cold War's nuclear arms race. Their destructiveness and ability to miniaturize high yields, such as in MIRV warheads, defines nuclear deterrence and mutual assured destruction. Extensions of thermonuclear weapon design include clean bombs with marginal fallout and neutron bombs with enhanced penetrating radiation. Nonetheless, most thermonuclear weapons designed, including all current US and UK nuclear warheads, derive most of their energy from fast fission, causing high fallout.

== Terminology ==
The adjectives "thermonuclear", "fusion", and "hydrogen" are used mainly to describe multi-stage nuclear weapons, which allow large fusion yields. These operate on the radiation implosion principle, and are synonymous with the Teller-Ulam design, independently developed by at least five countries.

"Thermonuclear" refers to thermonuclear fusion, where nuclei are fused via their high collision speeds at high temperatures. Unlike fission weapons, whose detonations are mediated via neutron transport, thermonuclear yield is more directly dependent on the temperatures and pressures achieved during compression of the secondary.

These are in contrast to boosted fission devices, which employ thermonuclear fusion, but detonate a single stage design theoretically limited to around one megaton.

Despite their name, the simplest and most common thermonuclear weapons derive most of their yield (>80% for US weapons) from fast fission of a natural or depleted uranium tamper. Clean thermonuclear weapons (<10% fission) have also been tested and possibly deployed.

== Basic principle ==
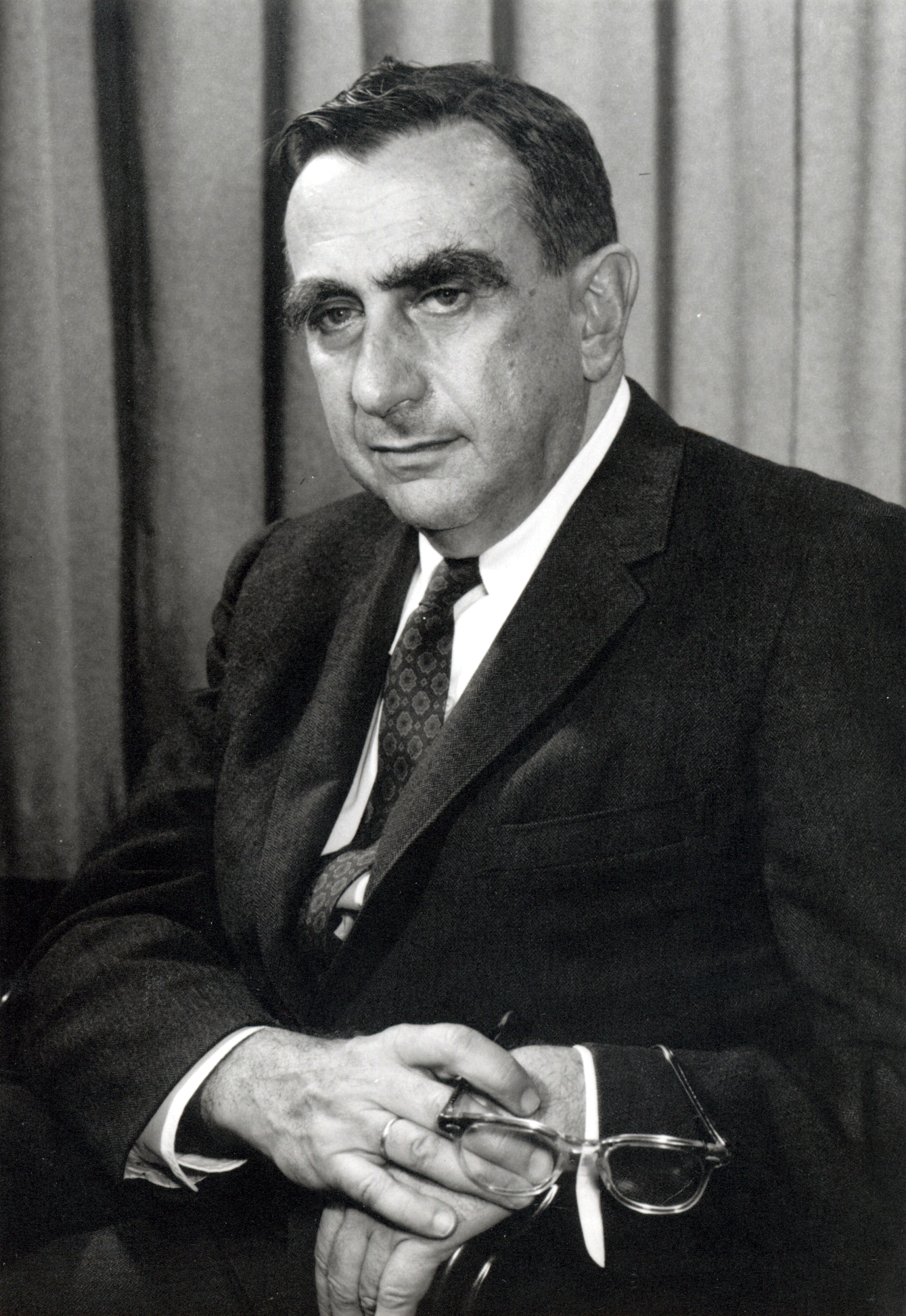
Edward Teller in 1958

=== Primary and secondary stages ===
The basic principle of the Teller–Ulam configuration is the idea that different parts of a thermonuclear weapon can be chained together in stages, with the detonation of each stage providing the energy to ignite the next stage. At a minimum, this implies a primary section that consists of an implosion-type fission bomb (a "trigger"), and a secondary section that consists of fusion fuel. The energy released by the primary compresses the secondary through the process of radiation implosion, at which point it is heated and undergoes nuclear fusion. This process could be continued, with energy from the secondary igniting a third fusion stage; the Soviet Tsar Bomba and US B41 nuclear bombs are believed to have used this design. Theoretically by continuing this process thermonuclear weapons with arbitrarily high yield could be constructed. Fission weapons are limited in yield because only so much fission fuel can be amassed in one place before the danger of its accidentally becoming supercritical becomes too great; the British Orange Herald was the largest single-stage fission test ever, at 700 kilotons.

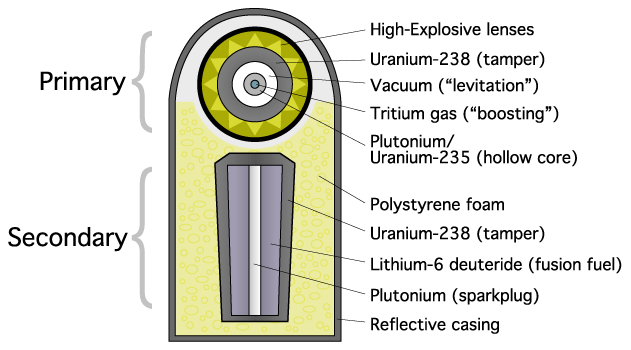
One possible version of the Teller–Ulam configuration

Surrounding the other components is a hohlraum or radiation case, a container that traps the first stage or primary's energy inside temporarily. The outside of this radiation case, which is also normally the outside casing of the bomb, is the only direct visual evidence publicly available of any thermonuclear bomb component's configuration. Numerous photographs of various thermonuclear bomb exteriors have been declassified.

The primary is a standard implosion method fission bomb, though likely with a core boosted by small amounts of fusion fuel (usually 1:1 deuterium:tritium gas) for extra efficiency; the fusion fuel releases excess neutrons when heated and compressed, inducing additional fission. When fired, the ^{239}Pu or ^{235}U core would be compressed to a smaller sphere by special layers of conventional high explosives arranged around it in an explosive lens pattern, initiating the nuclear chain reaction that powers the conventional "atomic bomb".

The secondary is usually shown as a column of fusion fuel and other components wrapped in many layers. Around the column is first a "pusher-tamper", a heavy layer of uranium-238 (^{238}U) or lead that helps compress the fusion fuel (and, in the case of uranium, may eventually undergo fission itself). Inside this is the fusion fuel, usually a form of lithium deuteride, which is used because it is easier to weaponize than liquefied tritium/deuterium gas. This dry fuel, when bombarded by neutrons, produces tritium, a heavy isotope of hydrogen that can undergo nuclear fusion, along with the deuterium present in the mixture. Inside the layer of fuel is the "spark plug", a hollow column of fissile material (^{239}Pu or ^{235}U) often boosted by deuterium gas. The spark plug, when compressed, can undergo nuclear fission (because of the shape, it is not a critical mass without compression). The tertiary, if one is present, would be set below the secondary and probably be made of the same materials.

=== Interstage ===
Separating the secondary from the primary is the interstage. The fissioning primary produces four types of energy: 1) expanding hot gases from high explosive charges that implode the primary; 2) superheated plasma that was originally the bomb's fissile material and its tamper; 3) the electromagnetic radiation; and 4) the neutrons from the primary's nuclear detonation. The interstage is responsible for accurately modulating the transfer of energy from the primary to the secondary. It must direct the hot gases, plasma, electromagnetic radiation and neutrons toward the right place at the right time. Less than optimal interstage designs have resulted in the secondary failing to work entirely on multiple shots, known as a "fissile fizzle". The Castle Koon shot of Operation Castle is a good example; a small flaw allowed the neutron flux from the primary to prematurely begin heating the secondary, weakening the compression enough to prevent any fusion.

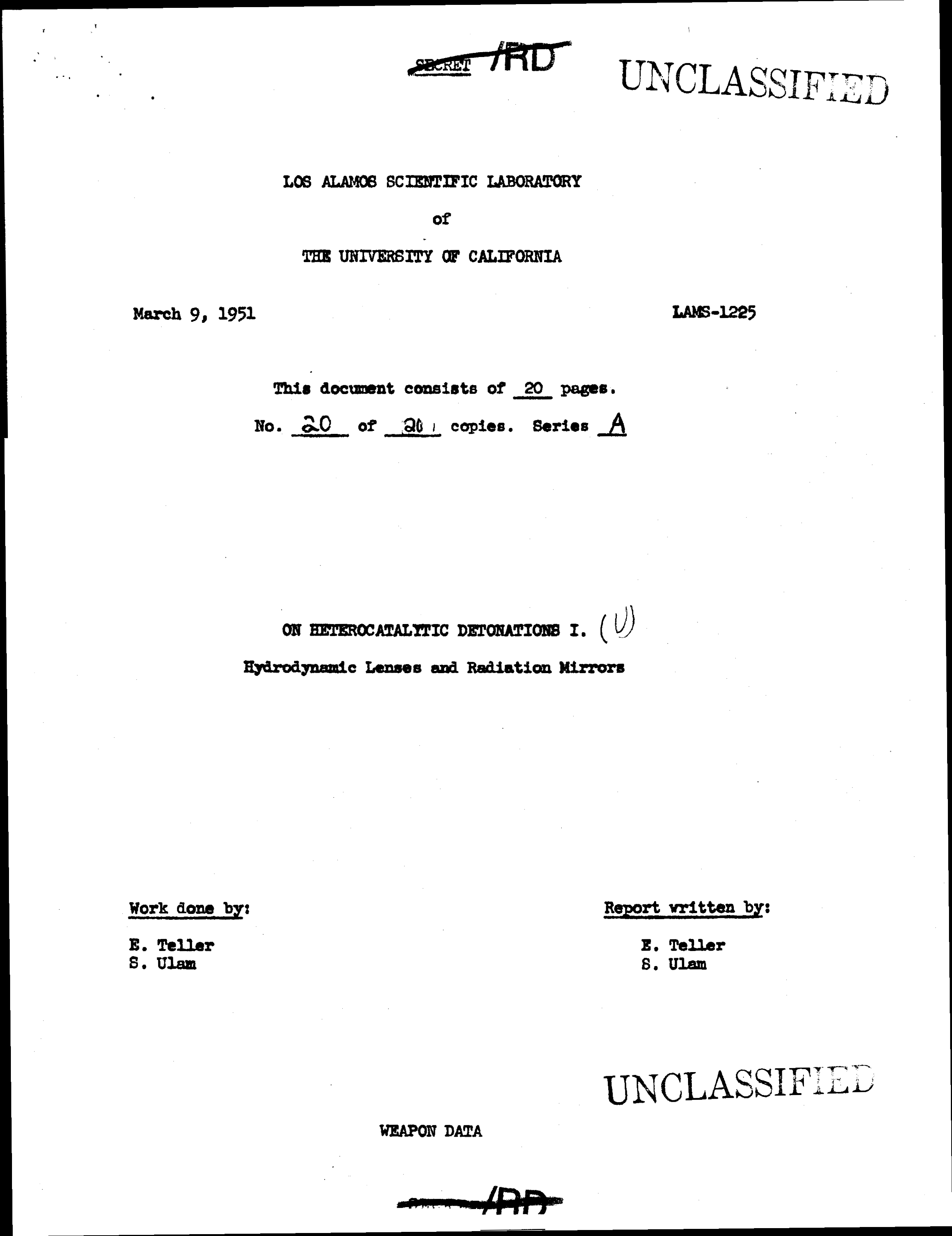
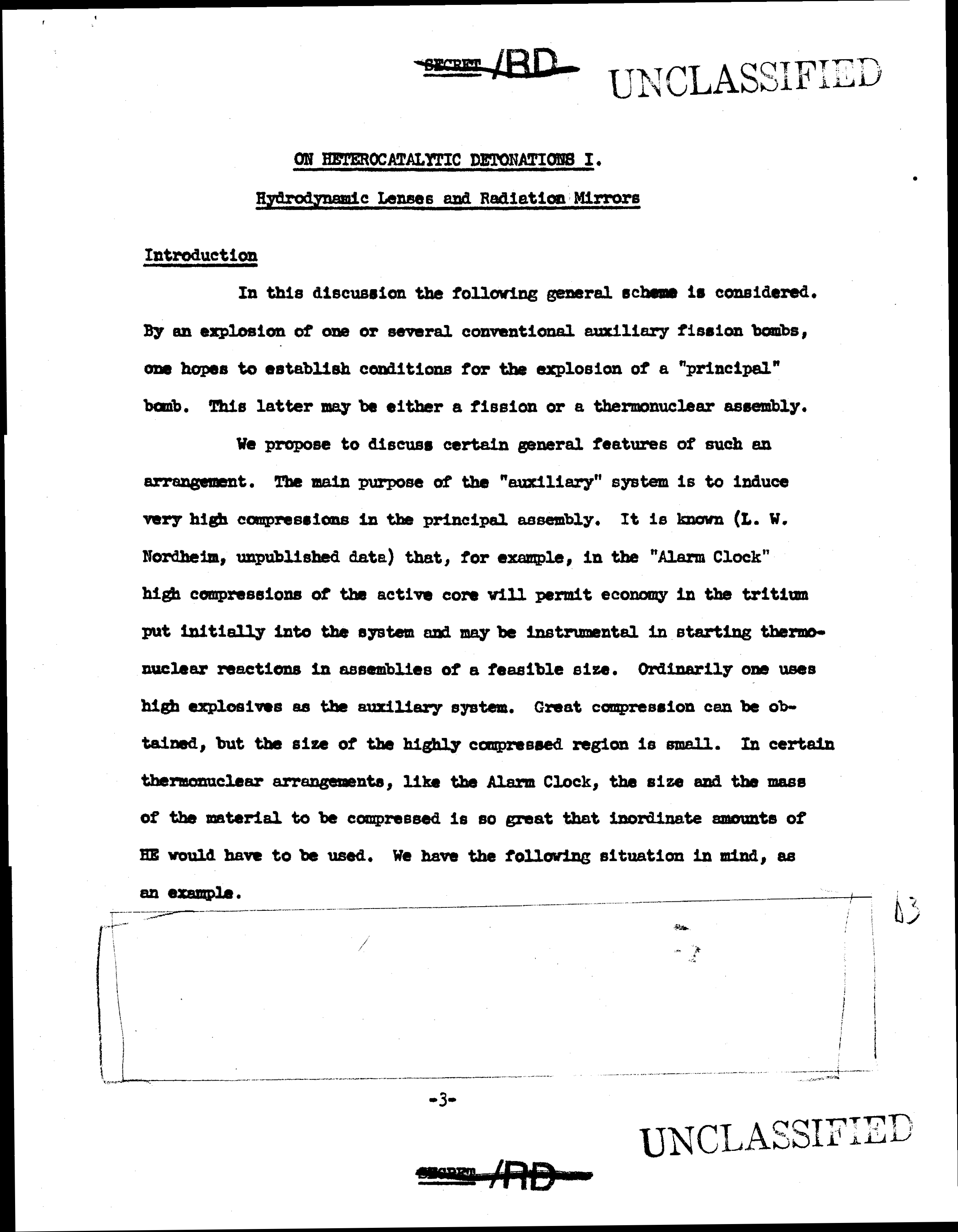
A classified paper by Teller and Ulam on 9 March 1951: On Heterocatalytic Detonations I: Hydrodynamic Lenses and Radiation Mirrors, in which they proposed their revolutionary staged implosion idea. This declassified version is extensively redacted.

There is very little detailed information in the open literature about the mechanism of the interstage. One of the best sources is a simplified diagram of a British thermonuclear weapon similar to the American W80 warhead. It was released by Greenpeace in a report titled "Dual Use Nuclear Technology". The major components and their arrangement are in the diagram, though details are almost absent; what scattered details it does include likely have intentional omissions or inaccuracies. They are labeled "End-cap and Neutron Focus Lens" and "Reflector Wrap"; the former channels neutrons to the ^{235}U/^{239}Pu spark plug while the latter refers to an X-ray reflector; typically a cylinder made of an X-ray opaque material such as uranium with the primary and secondary at either end. It does not reflect like a mirror; instead, it gets heated to a high temperature by the X-ray flux from the primary, then it emits more evenly spread X-rays that travel to the secondary, causing what is known as radiation implosion. In Ivy Mike, gold was used as a coating over the uranium to enhance the blackbody effect.

Next comes the "Reflector/Neutron Gun Carriage". The reflector seals the gap between the Neutron Focus Lens (in the center) and the outer casing near the primary. It separates the primary from the secondary and performs the same function as the previous reflector. There are about six neutron guns (seen here from Sandia National Laboratories) each protruding through the outer edge of the reflector with one end in each section; all are clamped to the carriage and arranged more or less evenly around the casing's circumference. The neutron guns are tilted so the neutron emitting end of each gun end is pointed towards the central axis of the bomb. Neutrons from each neutron gun pass through and are focused by the neutron focus lens towards the center of primary in order to boost the initial fissioning of the plutonium. A "polystyrene Polarizer/Plasma Source" is also shown (see below).

The first US government document to mention the interstage was only recently released to the public promoting the 2004 initiation of the Reliable Replacement Warhead (RRW) Program. A graphic includes blurbs describing the potential advantage of a RRW on a part-by-part level, with the interstage blurb saying a new design would replace "toxic, brittle material" and "expensive 'special' material... [that require] unique facilities". The "toxic, brittle material" is widely assumed to be beryllium, which fits that description and would also moderate the neutron flux from the primary. Some material to absorb and re-radiate the X-rays in a particular manner may also be used.

Candidates for the "special material" are polystyrene and a substance called "Fogbank", an unclassified codename. Fogbank's composition is classified, though aerogel has been suggested as a possibility. It was first used in thermonuclear weapons with the W76 thermonuclear warhead and produced at a plant in the Y-12 Complex at Oak Ridge, Tennessee, for use in the W76. Production of Fogbank lapsed after the W76 production run ended. The W76 Life Extension Program required more Fogbank to be made. This was complicated by the fact that the original Fogbank's properties were not fully documented, so a massive effort was mounted to re-invent the process. An impurity crucial to the properties of the old Fogbank was omitted during the new process. Only close analysis of new and old batches revealed the nature of that impurity. The manufacturing process used acetonitrile as a solvent, which led to at least three evacuations of the Fogbank plant in 2006. Widely used in the petroleum and pharmaceutical industries, acetonitrile is flammable and toxic. Y-12 is the sole producer of Fogbank.

=== Summary ===
A simplified summary of the above explanation is:

1. A (relatively) small fission bomb known as the "primary" explodes.
2. Energy released in the primary is transferred to the "secondary" (or fusion) stage. This energy compresses the fusion fuel and sparkplug; the compressed sparkplug becomes supercritical and undergoes a fission chain reaction, further heating the compressed fusion fuel to a high enough temperature to induce fusion.
3. Energy released by the fusion events continues heating the fuel, keeping the reaction going.
4. The fusion fuel of the secondary stage may be surrounded by a layer of additional fuel that undergoes fission when hit by the neutrons from the reactions within. These fission events account for about half of the total energy released in typical designs.

== Compression of the secondary ==
How exactly the energy is "transported" from the primary to the secondary has been the subject of some disagreement in the open press but is thought to be transmitted through the X-rays and gamma rays that are emitted from the fissioning primary. This energy is then used to compress the secondary. The crucial detail of how the X-rays create the pressure is the main remaining disputed point in the unclassified press. There are three proposed theories:

- Radiation pressure exerted by the X-rays. This was the first idea put forth by Howard Morland in an article in The Progressive.
- Plasma pressure exerted by the X-ray-ionized channel filler (a polystyrene or plastic foam or "Fogbank"). This was a second idea put forward by Chuck Hansen and later by Howard Morland.
- Ablation pressure exerted by the tamper/pusher. This is the concept best supported by physical analysis.

=== Radiation pressure ===
The radiation pressure exerted by the large quantity of X-ray photons inside the closed casing might be enough to compress the secondary. Electromagnetic radiation such as X-rays or light carries momentum and exerts a force on any surface it strikes. The pressure of radiation at the intensities seen in everyday life, such as sunlight striking a surface, is usually imperceptible, but at the extreme intensities found in a thermonuclear bomb the pressure is enormous.

For two thermonuclear bombs for which the general size and primary characteristics are well understood, the Ivy Mike test bomb and the modern W-80 cruise missile warhead variant of the W-61 design, the radiation pressure was calculated to be 73×10^{6} bar (7.3 TPa) for the Ivy Mike design and 1,400×10^{6} bar (140 TPa) for the W-80.

=== Foam plasma pressure ===
Foam plasma pressure is the concept that Chuck Hansen introduced and published independently during the course of the Progressive case, based on research that located declassified documents listing special foams as liner components within the radiation case of thermonuclear weapons.

The sequence of firing the weapon (with the foam) would be as follows:

1. The high explosives surrounding the core of the primary fire, compressing the fissile material into a supercritical state and beginning the fission chain reaction.
2. The fissioning primary emits thermal X-rays, which "reflect" along the inside of the casing, irradiating the polystyrene foam.
3. The irradiated foam becomes a hot plasma, pushing against the tamper of the secondary, compressing it tightly, and beginning the fission chain reaction in the spark plug.
4. Pushed from both sides (from the primary and the spark plug), the lithium deuteride fuel is highly compressed and heated to thermonuclear temperatures. Also, by being bombarded with neutrons, each lithium-6 (^{6}Li) atom splits into one tritium atom and one alpha particle. Then begins a fusion reaction between the tritium and the deuterium, releasing even more neutrons, and a huge amount of energy.
5. The fuel undergoing the fusion reaction emits a large flux of high energy neutrons (14 MeV [2.2 pJ]), which irradiates the ^{238}U tamper (or the ^{238}U bomb casing), causing it to undergo a fast fission reaction, providing about half of the total energy.

This would complete the fission-fusion-fission sequence. Fusion, unlike fission, is relatively clean; it releases energy but no harmful radioactive products or large amounts of nuclear fallout. The fission reactions though, especially the last fission reactions, release a tremendous amount of fission products and fallout. If the last fission stage is omitted, by replacing the uranium tamper with one made of lead, for example, the overall explosive force is reduced by approximately half but the amount of fallout is relatively low. The neutron bomb is a hydrogen bomb with an intentionally thin tamper, allowing as many of the fast fusion neutrons as possible to escape.

Foam plasma mechanism firing sequence.: 1. Warhead before firing; primary (fission bomb) at top, secondary (fusion fuel) at bottom, all suspended in polystyrene foam.; 2. High-explosive fires in primary, compressing plutonium core into supercriticality and beginning a fission reaction.; 3. Fission primary emits X-rays that are scattered along the inside of the casing, irradiating the polystyrene foam.; 4. Polystyrene foam becomes plasma, compressing secondary, and plutonium sparkplug begins to fission.; 5. Compressed and heated, lithium-6 deuteride fuel produces tritium (^{3}H) and begins the fusion reaction. The neutron flux produced causes the ^{238}U tamper to fission. A fireball starts to form.

Current technical criticisms of the idea of "foam plasma pressure" focus on unclassified analysis from similar high energy physics fields that indicate that the pressure produced by such a plasma would only be a small multiplier of the basic photon pressure within the radiation case, and also that the known foam materials intrinsically have a very low absorption efficiency of the gamma ray and X-ray radiation from the primary. Most of the energy produced would be absorbed by either the walls of the radiation case or the tamper around the secondary. Analyzing the effects of that absorbed energy led to the third mechanism: ablation.

=== Tamper-pusher ablation ===
The outer casing of the secondary assembly is called the "tamper-pusher". The purpose of a tamper in an implosion bomb is to delay the expansion of the reacting fuel supply (which is very hot dense plasma) until the fuel is fully consumed and the explosion runs to completion. The same tamper material serves also as a pusher in that it is the medium by which the outside pressure (force acting on the surface area of the secondary) is transferred to the mass of fusion fuel.

The proposed tamper-pusher ablation mechanism posits that the outer layers of the thermonuclear secondary's tamper-pusher are heated so extremely by the primary's X-ray flux that they expand violently and ablate away (fly off). Because total momentum is conserved, this mass of high velocity ejecta impels the rest of the tamper-pusher to recoil inwards with tremendous force, crushing the fusion fuel and the spark plug. The tamper-pusher is built robustly enough to insulate the fusion fuel from the extreme heat outside; otherwise, the compression would be spoiled.

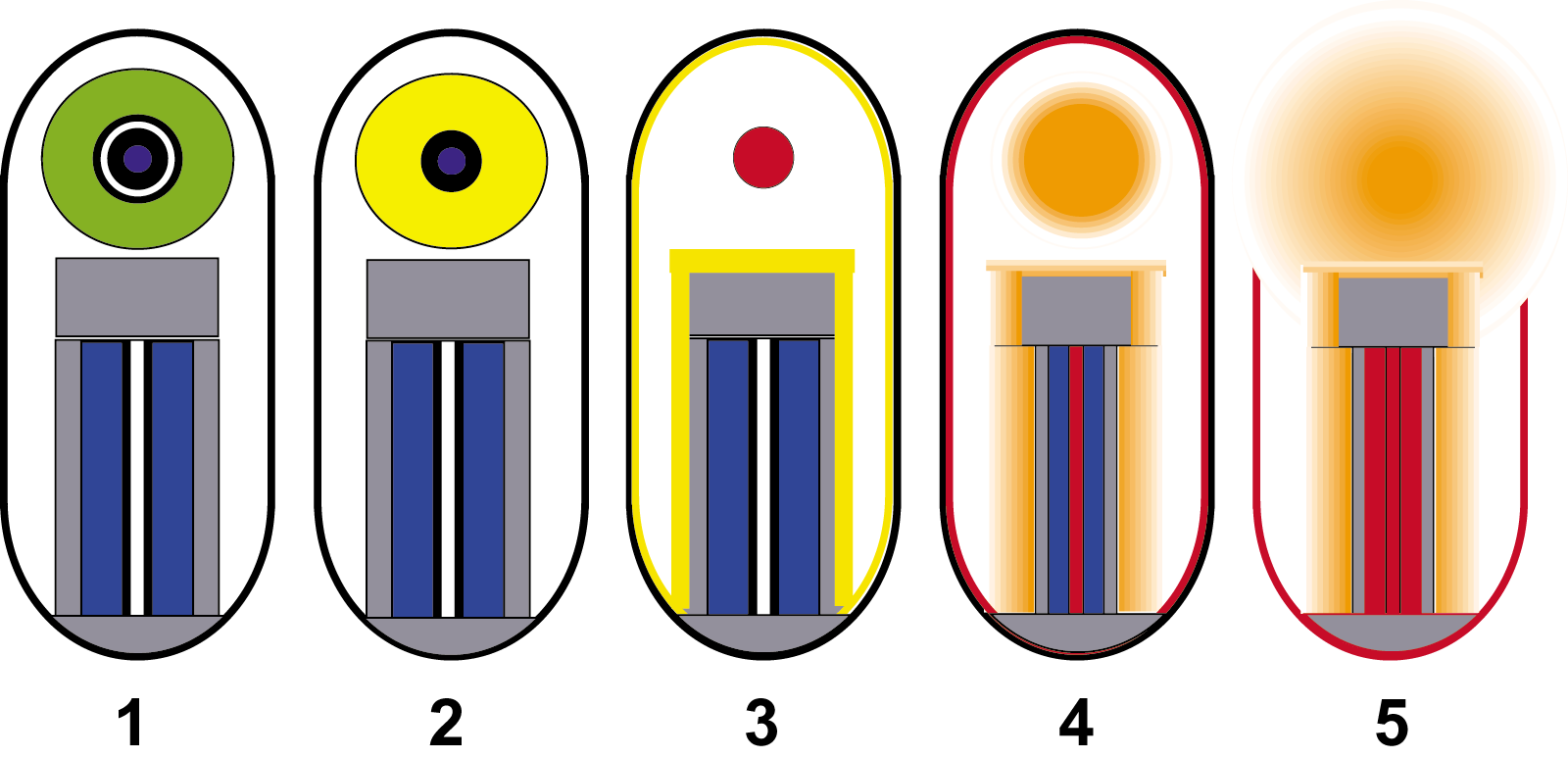
Ablation mechanism firing sequence.: 1. Warhead before firing. The nested spheres at the top are the fission primary; the cylinders below are the fusion secondary device.; 2. Fission primary's explosives have detonated and collapsed the primary's fissile pit.; 3. The primary's fission reaction has run to completion, and the primary is now at several million degrees and radiating gamma and hard X-rays, heating up the inside of the hohlraum and the shield and secondary's tamper.; 4. The primary's reaction is over and it has expanded. The surface of the pusher for the secondary is now so hot that it is also ablating or expanding away, pushing the rest of the secondary (tamper, fusion fuel, and fissile spark plug) inwards. The spark plug starts to fission. Not depicted: the radiation case is also ablating and expanding outwards (omitted for clarity of diagram).; 5. The secondary's fuel has started the fusion reaction and shortly will burn up. A fireball starts to form.

Rough calculations for the basic ablation effect are relatively simple: the energy from the primary is distributed evenly onto all of the surfaces within the outer radiation case, with the components coming to a thermal equilibrium, and the effects of that thermal energy are then analyzed. The energy is mostly deposited within about one X-ray optical thickness of the tamper/pusher outer surface, and the temperature of that layer can then be calculated. The velocity at which the surface then expands outwards is calculated and, from a basic Newtonian momentum balance, the velocity at which the rest of the tamper implodes inwards.

Applying the more detailed form of those calculations to the Ivy Mike device yields vaporized pusher gas expansion velocity of 290 kilometres per second (29 cm/μs) and an implosion velocity of perhaps 400 km/s (40 cm/μs) if 3/4 of the total tamper/pusher mass is ablated off, the most energy efficient proportion. For the W-80 the gas expansion velocity is roughly 410 km/s (41 cm/μs) and the implosion velocity 570 km/s (57 cm/μs). The pressure due to the ablating material is calculated to be 5.3 billion bars (530 trillion pascals) in the Ivy Mike device and 64 billion bars (6.4 quadrillion pascals) in the W-80 device.

=== Comparing implosion mechanisms ===
Comparing the three mechanisms proposed, it can be seen that:

Mechanism	Pressure (TPa)	
Mechanism	Ivy Mike	W80
Radiation pressure	7.3	140
Plasma pressure	35	750
Ablation pressure	530	6400

The calculated ablation pressure is one order of magnitude greater than the higher proposed plasma pressures and nearly two orders of magnitude greater than calculated radiation pressure. No mechanism to avoid the absorption of energy into the radiation case wall and the secondary tamper has been suggested, making ablation apparently unavoidable.

United States Department of Defense official declassification reports indicate that foamed plastic materials are or may be used in radiation case liners, and despite the low direct plasma pressure they may be of use in delaying the ablation until energy has distributed evenly and a sufficient fraction has reached the secondary's tamper/pusher.

Richard Rhodes' book Dark Sun stated that a 25-millimetre-thick (1 in) layer of plastic foam was fixed to the lead liner of the inside of the Ivy Mike steel casing using copper nails. Rhodes quotes several designers of that bomb explaining that the plastic foam layer inside the outer case is to delay ablation and thus recoil of the outer case: if the foam were not there, metal would ablate from the inside of the outer case with a large impulse, causing the casing to recoil outwards rapidly. The purpose of the casing is to contain the explosion for as long as possible, allowing as much X-ray ablation of the metallic surface of the secondary stage as possible, so it compresses the secondary efficiently, maximizing the fusion yield. Plastic foam has a low density, so causes a smaller impulse when it ablates than metal does.

== Design variations ==
Possible variations to the weapon design have been proposed:

- Either the tamper or the casing have been proposed to be made of ^{235}U (highly enriched uranium) in the final fission jacket. The far more expensive ^{235}U is also fissionable with fast neutrons like the ^{238}U in depleted or natural uranium, but its fission-efficiency is higher. This is because ^{235}U nuclei also undergo fission by slow neutrons (^{238}U nuclei require a minimum energy of about 1 megaelectronvolt (0.16 pJ)) and because these slower neutrons are produced by other fissioning ^{235}U nuclei in the jacket (in other words, ^{235}U supports the nuclear chain reaction whereas ^{238}U does not). Furthermore, a ^{235}U jacket fosters neutron multiplication, whereas ^{238}U nuclei consume fusion neutrons in the fast-fission process. Using a final fissionable/fissile jacket of ^{235}U would thus increase the yield of a Teller–Ulam bomb above a depleted uranium or natural uranium jacket. This has been proposed specifically for the W87 warheads retrofitted to currently deployed LGM-30 Minuteman III ICBMs.
- In some descriptions, additional internal structures exist to protect the secondary from receiving excessive neutrons from the primary.
- The inside of the casing may or may not be specially machined to "reflect" the X-rays. X-ray "reflection" is not like light reflecting off a mirror, but rather the reflector material is heated by the X-rays, causing the material to emit X-rays, which then travel to the secondary.

Most bombs do not apparently have tertiary "stages"—that is, third compression stage(s), which are additional fusion stages compressed by a previous fusion stage. The fissioning of the last blanket of uranium, which provides about half the yield in large bombs, does not count as a "stage" in this terminology.

The US tested three-stage bombs in several explosions during Operation Redwing but is thought to have fielded only one such tertiary model, i.e., a bomb in which a fission stage, followed by a fusion stage, finally compresses yet another fusion stage. This US design was the heavy but highly efficient (i.e., nuclear weapon yield per unit bomb weight) 25 Mt (100 PJ) B41 nuclear bomb. The Soviet Union is thought to have used multiple stages (including more than one tertiary fusion stage) in their 50 Mt (210 PJ) Tsar Bomba, which was 100 Mt (420 PJ) in intended use. The fissionable jacket could be replaced with lead, as was done with the Tsar Bomba. If any hydrogen bombs have been made from configurations other than those based on the Teller–Ulam design, the fact of it is not publicly known. A possible exception to this is the Soviet early Sloika design.

In essence, the Teller–Ulam configuration relies on at least two instances of implosion occurring: first, the conventional (chemical) explosives in the primary would compress the fissile core, resulting in a fission explosion many times more powerful than that which chemical explosives could achieve alone (first stage). Second, the radiation from the fissioning of the primary would be used to compress and ignite the secondary fusion stage, resulting in a fusion explosion many times more powerful than the fission explosion alone. This chain of compression could conceivably be continued with an arbitrary number of tertiary fusion stages, each igniting more fusion fuel in the next stage although this is debated. Finally, efficient bombs (but not so-called neutron bombs) end with the fissioning of the final natural uranium tamper, something that could not normally be achieved without the neutron flux provided by the fusion reactions in secondary or tertiary stages. Such designs are suggested to be capable of being scaled up to an arbitrary large yield (with apparently as many fusion stages as desired), potentially to the level of a "doomsday device." However, usually such weapons were not more than a dozen megatons, which was generally considered enough to destroy even the most hardened practical targets (for example, a control facility such as the Cheyenne Mountain Complex). Even such large bombs have been replaced by smaller yield nuclear bunker buster bombs.

For destruction of cities and non-hardened targets, breaking the mass of a single missile payload down into smaller MIRV bombs in order to spread the energy of the explosions into a "pancake" area is far more efficient in terms of area-destruction per unit of bomb energy. This also applies to single bombs deliverable by cruise missile or other system, such as a bomber, resulting in most operational warheads in the US program having yields of less than 500 kt (2,100 TJ).

=== Ivy Mike ===
In his 1995 book Dark Sun: The Making of the Hydrogen Bomb, author Richard Rhodes describes in detail the internal components of the "Ivy Mike" Sausage device, based on information obtained from extensive interviews with the scientists and engineers who assembled it. According to Rhodes, the actual mechanism for the compression of the secondary was a combination of the radiation pressure, foam plasma pressure, and tamper-pusher ablation theories; the radiation from the primary heated the polyethylene foam lining of the casing to a plasma, which then re-radiated radiation into the secondary's pusher, causing its surface to ablate and driving it inwards, compressing the secondary, igniting the sparkplug, and causing the fusion reaction. The general applicability of this principle is unclear.

=== Ripple ===
The Ripple secondary is the cleanest (largest fusion fraction) and highest yield-to-weight ratio device tested. It was tested during the 1962 Operation Dominic series. Unlike previous clean bombs, which were clean simply by replacing the uranium-238 tamper with lead, Ripple was inherently clean. The fission sparkplug was replaced by a large deuterium-tritium gas core, surrounded by a thinner lithium deuteride shell. It is assumed that thin concentric shells of a high-Z material like lead, driven by the small Kinglet primary allowed propagated sustained shockwaves to the core, sustaining the thermonuclear burn and giving the device its name. The design was influenced by the nascent field of inertial confinement fusion. Ripple was also extremely efficient; plans were made for a 15 kt/kg. Shot Androscoggin featured a proof-of-concept Ripple design, resulting in a 63-kiloton fizzle (significantly lower than the predicted 15 megatons). It was repeated in shot Housatonic, which featured a 9.96 megaton explosion that was reportedly >99.9% fusion.

While it was extremely lightweight, the large amount of DT gas used made it a low density and thus high volume warhead. Among US ICBMs, only the Titan II was wide enough to deliver it, but the military had already shifted away from it towards the smaller Minuteman missiles.

=== W88 ===
In 1999 a reporter for the San Jose Mercury News reported that the US W88 nuclear warhead, a small MIRVed warhead used on the Trident II SLBM, had a prolate primary (code-named Komodo) and a spherical secondary (code-named Cursa) inside a specially shaped radiation case (known as the "peanut" for its shape). The value of an egg-shaped primary lies apparently in the fact that a MIRV warhead is limited by the diameter of the primary: if an egg-shaped primary can be made to work properly, then the MIRV warhead can be made considerably smaller yet still deliver a high-yield explosion. A W88 warhead manages to yield up to 475 kilotonnes of TNT (1,990 TJ) with a physics package 1,750 mm (68.9 in) long, with a maximum diameter of 550 mm (21.8 in), and by different estimates weighing in a range from 175 to 360 kilograms (386 to 794 lb). The smaller warhead allows more of them to fit onto a single missile and improves basic flight properties such as speed and range.

== History ==
=== First tests ===
First tests by nuclear weapon design
Country	Fission	Year	Boosted fission	Year	Multi-stage	Year	Multi-stage above one megaton	Year
United States	Trinity	1945	Item	1951	George	1951	Ivy Mike	1952
Soviet Union	RDS-1	1949	RDS-6s	1953	RDS-37	1955	RDS-37	1955
United Kingdom	Operation Hurricane	1952	G1	1956	Grapple 1	1957	Grapple X	1957
France	Gerboise Bleue	1960	Rigel	1966	Canopus	1968	Canopus	1968
China	596	1964	596L	1966	629	1966	639	1967
India	Operation Smiling Buddha	1974			Operation Shakti (questioned)	1998	n/a	
Pakistan	Chagai I	1998	Chagai I	1998	n/a		—	
North Korea	#2	2009			#4 (unconfirmed) #6 (unconfirmed)	2016; 2017	—	
Israel	See Nuclear weapons of Israel § Nuclear testing						—	
South Africa	See South Africa and weapons of mass destruction § Nuclear weapons						—	

=== United States ===
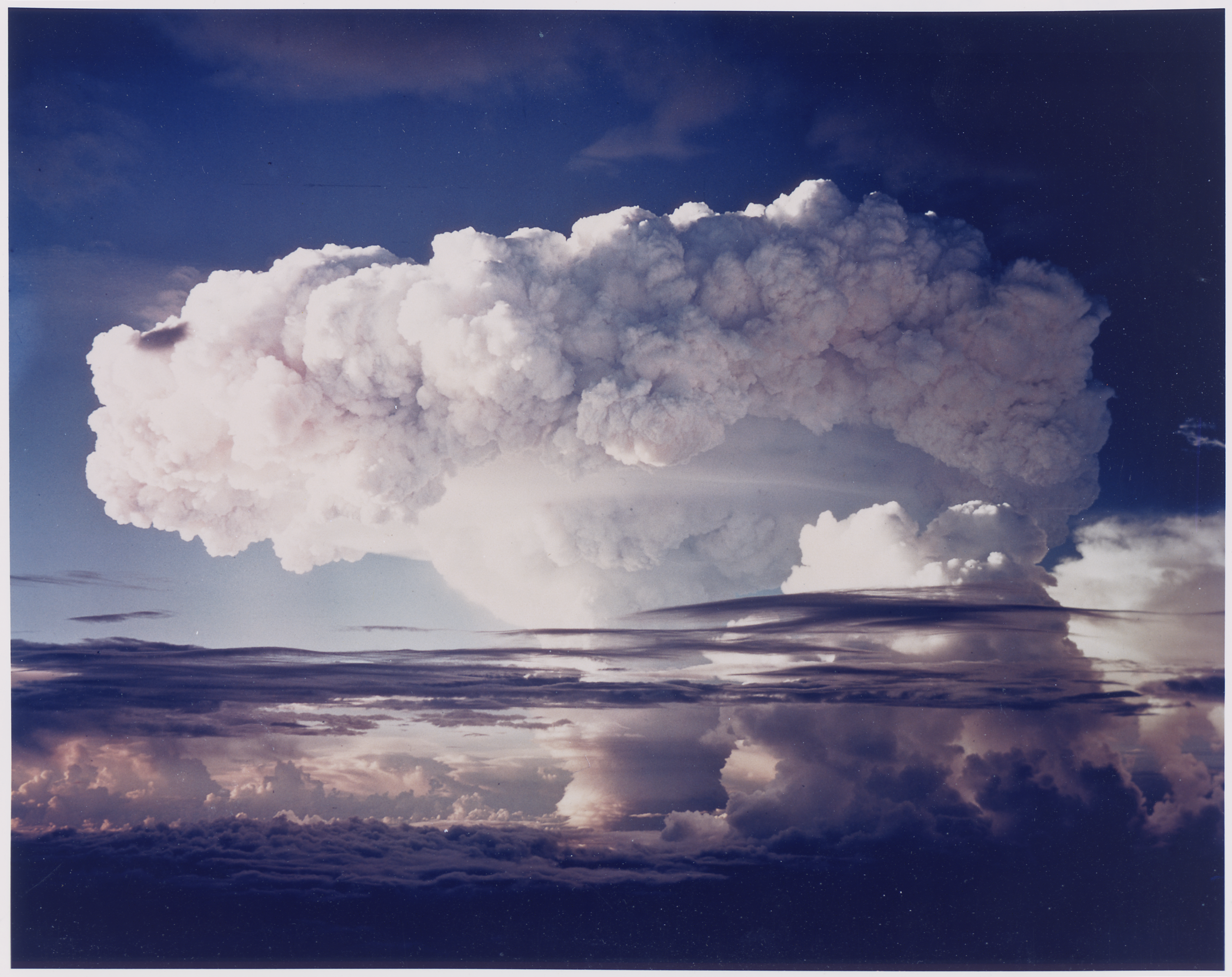
Ivy Mike, first full-scale thermonuclear test, Enewetak Atoll, November 1, 1952

The idea of a thermonuclear fusion bomb ignited by a smaller fission bomb was first proposed by Enrico Fermi to his colleague Edward Teller when they were talking at Columbia University in September 1941, at the start of what would become the Manhattan Project. Teller spent much of the Manhattan Project attempting to figure out how to make the design work, preferring it over work on the atomic bomb, and over the last year of the project he was assigned exclusively to the task. However once World War II ended, there was little impetus to devote many resources to the Super, as it was then known.

The first atomic bomb test by the Soviet Union in August 1949 came earlier than expected by Americans, and over the next several months there was an intense debate within the US government, military, and scientific communities regarding whether to proceed with development of the far more powerful Super. The debate covered matters that were alternatively strategic, pragmatic, and moral. In their Report of the General Advisory Committee, Robert Oppenheimer, Fermi, and colleagues, warning of the civilian casualties inherent to its use, characterized it as a "weapon of genocide", and concluded that "[t]he extreme danger to mankind inherent in the proposal [to develop thermonuclear weapons] wholly outweighs any military advantage". Despite the objections raised, on 31 January 1950, President Harry S. Truman made the decision to go forward with the development of the new weapon.

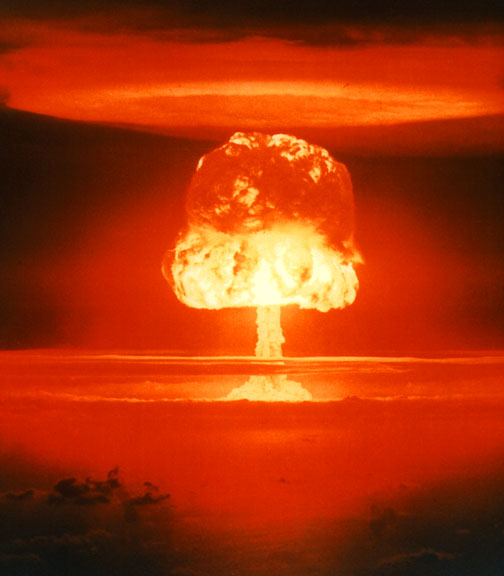
Operation Castle thermonuclear test, Castle Romeo shot

Teller and other US physicists struggled to find a workable design. Stanislaw Ulam, a co-worker of Teller, made the first key conceptual leaps towards a workable fusion design. Ulam's two innovations that rendered the fusion bomb practical were that compression of the thermonuclear fuel before extreme heating was a practical path towards the conditions needed for fusion, and the idea of staging or placing a separate thermonuclear component outside a fission primary component, and somehow using the primary to compress the secondary. Teller then realized that the gamma and X-ray radiation produced in the primary could transfer enough energy into the secondary to create a successful implosion and fusion burn, if the whole assembly was wrapped in a hohlraum or radiation case.

The "George" shot of Operation Greenhouse of 9 May 1951 tested the basic concept for the first time on a very small scale. As the first successful (uncontrolled) release of nuclear fusion energy, which made up a small fraction of the 225 kt (940 TJ) total yield, it raised expectations to a near certainty that the concept would work. On 1 November 1952, the Teller–Ulam configuration was tested at full scale in the Mike shot of Operation Ivy, at an island in the Enewetak Atoll, with a yield of 10.4 Mt (44 PJ) (over 450 times more powerful than the bomb dropped on Nagasaki during World War II). The device, dubbed the Sausage, was created by Richard Garwin, assigned this task by Edward Teller. This was not widely known until 2001, as his involvement was kept secret. It used an extra-large fission bomb as a "trigger" and liquid deuterium—kept in its liquid state by 20 short tons (18 t) of cryogenic equipment—as its fusion fuel, and weighed around 80 short tons (73 t) altogether.

The liquid deuterium fuel of Ivy Mike was impractical for a deployable weapon, and the next advance was to use a solid lithium deuteride fusion fuel instead. In 1954 this was tested in the "Castle Bravo" shot (the device was code-named Shrimp), which had a yield of 15 Mt (63 PJ), 2.5 times what was expected, and is the largest US bomb ever tested. Efforts shifted towards developing miniaturized Teller–Ulam weapons that could fit into intercontinental ballistic missiles and submarine-launched ballistic missiles. By 1960, with the W47 warhead deployed on Polaris ballistic missile submarines, megaton-class warheads were as small as 460 mm (18 in) in diameter and 330 kilograms (720 lb) in weight. Further innovation in miniaturizing warheads was accomplished by the mid-1970s, when versions of the Teller–Ulam design were created that could fit ten or more warheads on the end of a small MIRVed missile.

=== Soviet Union ===
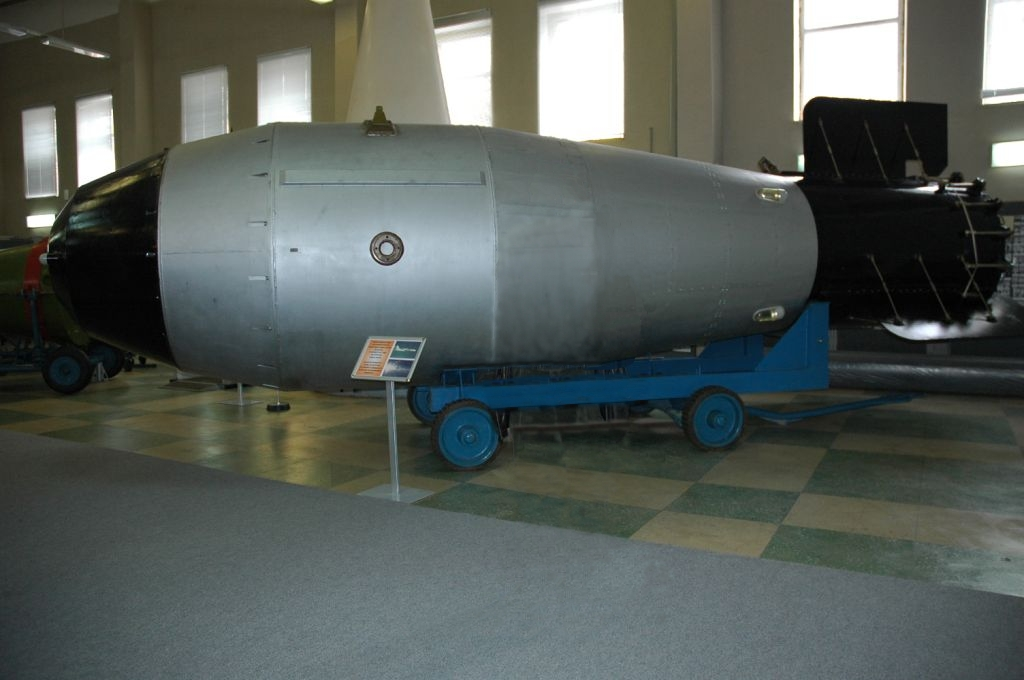
Casing of the Soviet Tsar Bomba, the largest nuclear weapon ever built and tested, Sarov, Russia.

The first Soviet fusion design, developed by Andrei Sakharov and Vitaly Ginzburg in 1949 (before the Soviets had a working fission bomb), was dubbed the Sloika, after a Russian layer cake, and was not of the Teller–Ulam configuration. It used alternating layers of fissile material and lithium deuteride fusion fuel spiked with tritium (this was later dubbed Sakharov's "First Idea"). Though nuclear fusion might have been technically achievable, it did not have the scaling property of a "staged" weapon. Thus, such a design could not produce thermonuclear weapons whose explosive yields could be made arbitrarily large (unlike US designs at that time). The fusion layer wrapped around the fission core could only moderately multiply the fission energy (modern Teller–Ulam designs can multiply it 30-fold). Additionally, the whole fusion stage had to be imploded by conventional explosives, along with the fission core, substantially increasing the amount of chemical explosives needed.

The first Sloika design test, RDS-6s, was detonated in 1953 with a yield equivalent to 400 kt (1,700 TJ), 15%-20% of which was from fusion. Attempts to use a Sloika design to achieve megaton-range results proved unfeasible. After the United States tested the "Ivy Mike" thermonuclear device in November 1952, proving that a multimegaton bomb could be created, the Soviets searched for an alternative design. The "Second Idea", as Sakharov referred to it in his memoirs, was a previous proposal by Ginzburg in November 1948 to use lithium deuteride in the bomb, which would, in the course of being bombarded by neutrons, produce tritium and free deuterium. In late 1953 physicist Viktor Davidenko achieved the first breakthrough of staging the reactions. The next breakthrough of radiation implosion was discovered and developed by Sakharov and Yakov Zel'dovich in early 1954. Sakharov's "Third Idea", as the Teller–Ulam design was known in the USSR, was tested in the shot "RDS-37" in November 1955 with a yield of 1.6 Mt (6.7 PJ). The Soviets demonstrated the power of the staging concept in October 1961, when they detonated the massive and unwieldy Tsar Bomba. It was the largest nuclear weapon developed and tested by any country.

=== United Kingdom ===
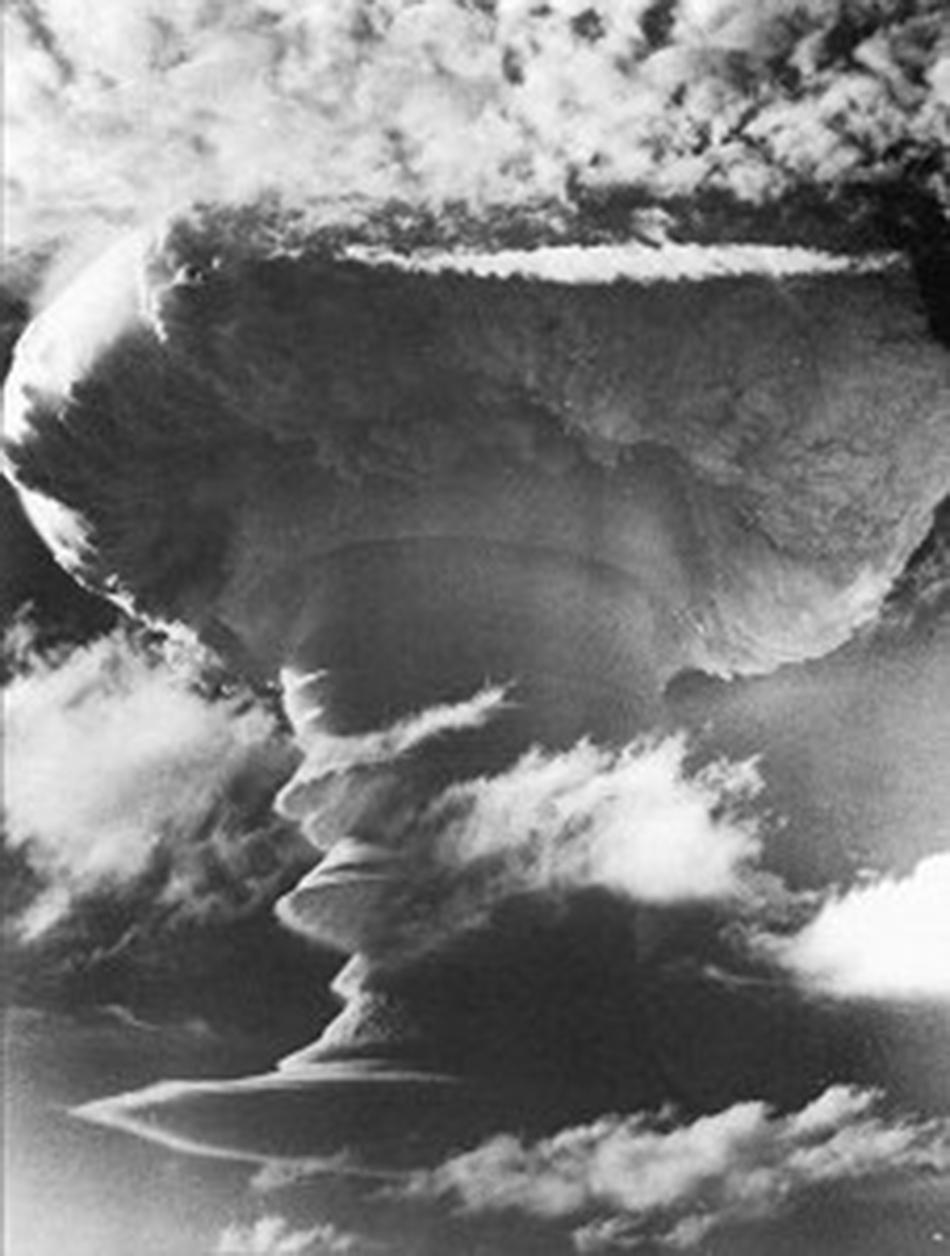
Operation Grapple on Christmas Island was the first British hydrogen bomb test.

In 1954 work began at Aldermaston on the British hydrogen bomb programme, with Sir William Penney in charge of the project. British knowledge on how to make a thermonuclear fusion bomb was rudimentary, and at the time the United States was not exchanging any nuclear knowledge because of the Atomic Energy Act of 1946. The United Kingdom had worked closely with the Americans on the Manhattan Project. British access to nuclear weapons information was cut off by the United States at one point due to concerns about Soviet espionage. Full cooperation was not reestablished until an agreement governing the handling of secret information and other issues was signed. However, the British were allowed to observe the US Castle tests and used sampling aircraft in the mushroom clouds, providing them with clear, direct evidence of the compression produced in the secondary stages by radiation implosion. Because of these difficulties, in 1955 Prime Minister Anthony Eden agreed to a secret plan, whereby if the Aldermaston scientists failed or were greatly delayed in developing the fusion bomb, it would be replaced by an extremely large fission bomb.

In 1957 the Operation Grapple tests were carried out. The first test, Green Granite, was a prototype fusion bomb that failed to produce equivalent yields compared to the US and Soviets, achieving only approximately 300 kt (1,300 TJ). The second test Orange Herald was the modified fission bomb and produced 720 kt (3,000 TJ)—making it the largest fission explosion ever. At the time almost everyone (including the pilots of the plane that dropped it) thought that this was a fusion bomb. This bomb was put into service in 1958. A second prototype fusion bomb, Purple Granite, was used in the third test, but only produced approximately 150 kt (630 TJ).

A second set of tests was scheduled, with testing recommencing in September 1957. The first test was based on a "new simpler design. A two-stage thermonuclear bomb that had a much more powerful trigger". This test Grapple X Round C was exploded on 8 November and yielded approximately 1.8 Mt (7.5 PJ). On 28 April 1958 a bomb was dropped that yielded 3 Mt (13 PJ)—Britain's most powerful test. Two final air burst tests on 2 and 11 September 1958, dropped smaller bombs that yielded around 1 Mt (4.2 PJ) each.

American observers had been invited to these kinds of tests. After Britain's successful detonation of a megaton-range device (and thus demonstrating a practical understanding of the Teller–Ulam design "secret"), the United States agreed to exchange some of its nuclear designs with the United Kingdom, leading to the 1958 US–UK Mutual Defence Agreement. Instead of continuing with its own design, the British were given access to the design of the smaller American Mk 28 warhead and were able to manufacture copies.

=== China ===
China detonated a full-scale multi-stage thermonuclear bomb, codenamed "639", on 17 June 1967, with a yield of 3.31 Mt (13.8 PJ), becoming the world's fourth thermonuclear power. At only 32 months after detonating its first fission weapon, this remains the fastest success of a national hydrogen bomb program following a nation's first nuclear test. China had previously tested a layer cake design ("596L") boosted fission weapon in May 1966, yielding 220 kt (920 TJ), and a small-scale multi-stage thermonuclear bomb ("629") in December 1966. Testing took place in the Lop Nor Test Site in northwest China.

The Soviet Union assisted the Chinese nuclear program from 1957, but this was abruptly ended by the Sino-Soviet split in 1959. For thermonuclear weapons, China had received a lithium deuteride production plant, and limited knowledge of the Soviet layer cake design. Unlike the US and USSR, at the time of their hydrogen bomb program, China operated no production facilities for plutonium or tritium. Plutonium production reactor in Jiuquan became operational only in 1967, and plutonium separation began in September 1968. During 1963, Chinese scientists led by Peng Huanwu extensively investigated this design, but knew it was too inefficient to be the hydrogen bomb possessed by other countries. Nonetheless, plans were made to test a small layer cake designs in 1966 and "658", a three-staged layer cake design capable of reaching one megaton (similar to the British backup design Orange Herald Large), in October 1967. In September and October 1965, a theoretical research crash project ran in Shanghai led by Yu Min, using digital computers and manual calculation. Yu held a lecture series on the layer cake bomb, and in doing so realized its flaw was its slow production of tritium from lithium deuteride i.e. the Jetter cycle. This resulted in a Teller-Ulam analogue design for compression of a thermonuclear secondary by a fission primary. In December 1965, this design was selected as the focus of thermonuclear development. Yu later stated this rapid development prevented the hydrogen bomb research program from crumbling during the ten-year Cultural Revolution beginning in May 1966 (such as occurred to China's first crewed space program).

The 1966 small layer cake test was still carried out in May 1966 as "596L" (for Project 596 first atomic bomb but with the addition of lithium deuteride). The true two-stage thermonuclear design first tested at a small scale as the "629" device, in December 1966, yielding 120 kt (500 TJ). Following this success it was decided to cannibalize the materials from the backup "658" layer cake project. In the fervor of the Cultural Revolution, the Ninth Academy eagerly competed against Peng Huanwu's prediction that France would test its first hydrogen bomb in 1967, and moved the speculative 639 test date from October to July. The two-stage design was then tested at full scale as the "639" device aka Test No. 6 in June 1967, yielding 3.31 Mt (13.8 PJ).

In China the two-stage design has become known as the Yu Min configuration (于敏构型, Yú Mǐn gòu xíng). The Chinese government claims that although it is a multi-stage thermonuclear weapon design, it is distinct from the Teller-Ulam design assumed to be used by the other four thermonuclear nations, allowing further miniaturization, and that together these two comprise the only feasible thermonuclear weapon designs. The differences are unclear, as the Chinese design also channels energy from a nuclear fission primary to compress a thermonuclear secondary. Like the initial Soviet and British hydrogen bombs, the secondary is spherical, unlike the first cylindrical secondaries used in the US.

A story in The New York Times by William Broad reported that in 1995, a supposed Chinese double agent delivered information indicating that China knew secret details of the US W88 warhead, supposedly through espionage. (This line of investigation eventually resulted in the abortive trial of Wen Ho Lee.)

=== France ===
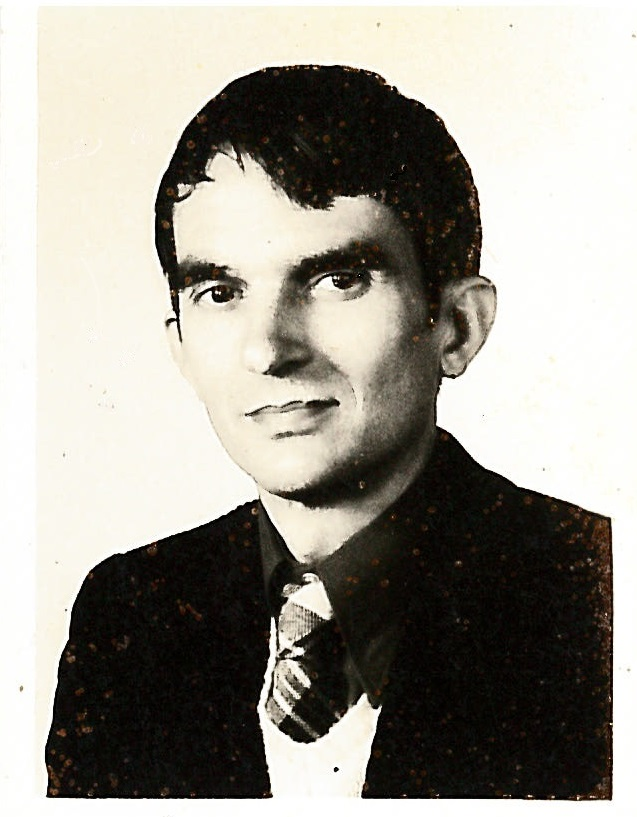
French physicist Michel Carayol proposed the French analogue to the Teller-Ulam design.

Following their first nuclear test in 1960, France prioritized fission weapon development and deliverability by Mirage IV bombers. In 1966, de Gaulle felt pressure that China would become the fourth thermonuclear country, and set a deadline of 1968 for the first hydrogen bomb test. A participating scientist, Pierre Billaud, wrote of French thermonuclear knowledge in 1965:

Compared to our American colleagues in 1948, French scientists had many advantages: we knew that hydrogen bombs existed and worked and that they used Li6D [lithium deuteride], and we understood the reactions at work. We also had powerful computers, of US origin, which were not available in the late 1940s. And we knew, more or less, the dimensions and weights of the nuclear weapons deployed at NATO bases in Europe and their yields. This information was obtained from tips we had managed to get, as well as from articles in the open literature from such publications as Aviation Week or the Bulletin of the Atomic Scientists.

Early tests "closely fitted Li6D [lithium deuteride] to the fissile core", implying a layer cake design. France began testing thermonuclear principles in the 1966–70 French nuclear tests, beginning with the 125 kt Rigel boosted fission shot in September 1966. In April 1967, physicist Michel Carayol outlined the radiation implosion idea central to the Teller-Ulam design, but the weapons scientists were not immediately convinced it was the solution. In June, France lost the hydrogen bomb race to China's three-megaton Project 639 test. By mid-1967, like their Chinese counterparts, French scientists had identified an extremely high, almost twenty-fold density increase of the lithium deuteride fuel, to be crucial to megaton success, but planned a test of Carayol's correct Teller-Ulam analogue as only one of three designs for summer of 1968.

France's hydrogen bomb development path was crucially influenced by the British scientist William Richard Joseph Cook, who led the successful British hydrogen bomb programme a decade prior. Unlike France, the UK, as well as the US and USSR, had aerial reconnaissance capabilities to collect nuclear fallout from testing and make deductions, including France's lack of progress in thermonuclear weapons. In September 1967, Cook provided limited thermonuclear development information to the military attache at the French Embassy in London, specifically that their current designs would not succeed and that the solution was more simple. This allowed the French scientists to identify and proceed with only Carayol's proposal for the ultimately successful 1968 thermonuclear tests. It is believed this was done on the instruction of Prime Minister Harold Wilson, aimed as an overture to de Gaulle, who was currently blocking the accession of the United Kingdom to the European Communities due to its closer relationship to the United States. However, de Gaulle again vetoed UK accession in November 1967, and was very shocked when made aware of the British contribution.

The first DT-boosted warhead, the MR 41, was tested in the Castor and Pollux shots of July and August 1968, successfully yielding 450 kt (1,900 TJ) in the former.

The "Canopus" test in the Fangataufa atoll in French Polynesia on 24 August 1968 was the country's first multistage thermonuclear weapon test. The bomb was detonated from a balloon at a height of 520 metres (1,710 ft). The result of this test was significant atmospheric contamination. France is currently believed to have nuclear weapons equal in sophistication to the other major nuclear powers.

France and China did not sign or ratify the Partial Nuclear Test Ban Treaty of 1963, which banned nuclear test explosions in the atmosphere, underwater, or in outer space. Between 1966 and 1996 France carried out more than 190 nuclear tests. France's final nuclear test took place on 27 January 1996, and then the country dismantled its Polynesian test sites. France signed the Comprehensive Nuclear-Test-Ban Treaty that same year, and then ratified the Treaty within two years.

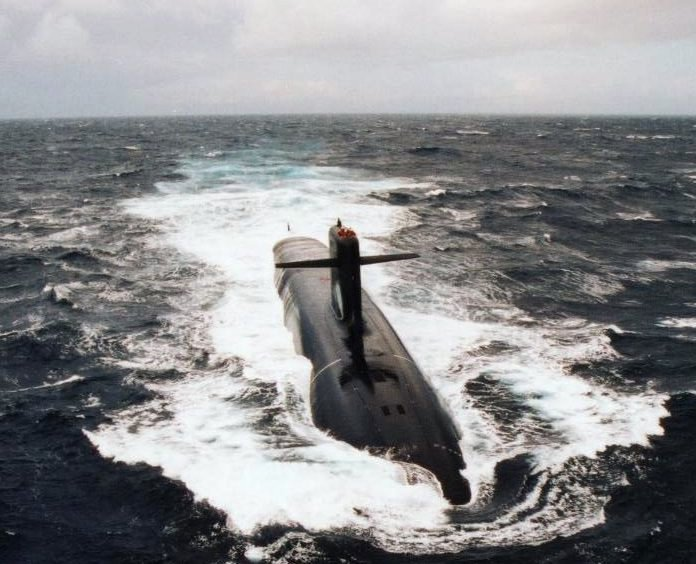
One of France's Triomphant-class nuclear-armed submarines, Le Téméraire (S617)

In 2015 France confirmed that its nuclear arsenal contains about 300 warheads, carried by submarine-launched ballistic missiles and fighter-bombers. France has four Triomphant-class ballistic missile submarines. One ballistic missile submarine is deployed in the deep ocean, but a total of three must be in operational use at all times. The three older submarines are armed with 16 M45 missiles. The newest submarine, "Le Terrible", was commissioned in 2010, and it has M51 missiles capable of carrying TN 75 thermonuclear warheads. The air fleet is four squadrons at four different bases. In total, there are 23 Mirage 2000N aircraft and 20 Rafales capable of carrying nuclear warheads. The M51.1 missiles are intended to be replaced with the new M51.2 warhead beginning in 2016, which has a 3,000-kilometre (1,900 mi) greater range than the M51.1.

France has about 60 air-launched missiles tipped with TN 80/TN 81 warheads with a yield of about 300 kt (1,300 TJ) each. France's nuclear program has been carefully designed to ensure that these weapons remain usable decades into the future. Currently, France is no longer deliberately producing critical mass materials such as plutonium and enriched uranium, but it still relies on nuclear energy for electricity, with ^{239}Pu as a byproduct.

=== India ===
Shakti-1

On 11 May 1998, India announced that it had detonated a thermonuclear bomb in its Operation Shakti tests ("Shakti-I", specifically, in Hindi the word 'Shakti' means power). Samar Mubarakmand, a Pakistani nuclear physicist, asserted that if Shakti-I had been a thermonuclear test, the device had failed to fire. However, Harold M. Agnew, former director of the Los Alamos National Laboratory, said that India's assertion of having detonated a staged thermonuclear bomb was believable. India says that their thermonuclear device was tested at a controlled yield of 45 kt (190 TJ) because of the close proximity of the Khetolai village at about 5 kilometres (3 mi), to ensure that the houses in that village do not suffer significant damage. Another cited reason was that radioactivity released from yields significantly more than 45 kt might not have been contained fully. After the Pokhran-II tests, Rajagopala Chidambaram, former chairman of the Atomic Energy Commission of India, said that India has the capability to build thermonuclear bombs of any yield at will. India officially maintains that it can build thermonuclear weapons of various yields up to around 200 kt (840 TJ) on the basis of the Shakti-1 thermonuclear test.

The yield of India's hydrogen bomb test remains highly debatable among the Indian science community and the international scholars. The question of politicisation and disputes between Indian scientists further complicated the matter. In an interview in August 2009, the director for the 1998 test site preparations, K. Santhanam claimed that the yield of the thermonuclear explosion was lower than expected and that India should therefore not rush into signing the Comprehensive Nuclear-Test-Ban Treaty. Other Indian scientists involved in the test have disputed Santhanam's claim, arguing that his claims are unscientific. British seismologist Roger Clarke argued that the magnitudes suggested a combined yield of up to 60 kilotonnes of TNT (250 TJ), consistent with the Indian announced total yield of 56 kilotonnes of TNT (230 TJ). US seismologist Jack Evernden has argued that for correct estimation of yields, one should 'account properly for geological and seismological differences between test sites'.

=== Israel ===
Israel is alleged to possess thermonuclear weapons of the Teller–Ulam design, but it is not known to have tested any nuclear devices, although it is widely speculated that the Vela incident of 1979 may have been a joint Israeli–South African nuclear test.

It is well established that Edward Teller advised and guided the Israeli establishment on general nuclear matters for some 20 years. Between 1964 and 1967, Teller made six visits to Israel where he lectured at the Tel Aviv University on general topics in theoretical physics. It took him a year to convince the CIA about Israel's capability and finally in 1976, Carl Duckett of the CIA testified to the US Congress, after receiving credible information from an "American scientist" (Teller), on Israel's nuclear capability. During the 1990s, Teller eventually confirmed speculations in the media that it was during his visits in the 1960s that he concluded that Israel was in possession of nuclear weapons. After he conveyed the matter to the higher level of the US government, Teller reportedly said: "They [Israel] have it, and they were clever enough to trust their research and not to test, they know that to test would get them into trouble."

=== North Korea ===
North Korea claimed to have tested its miniaturised thermonuclear bomb on 6 January 2016. North Korea's first three nuclear tests (2006, 2009 and 2013) were relatively low yield and do not appear to have been of a thermonuclear weapon design. In 2013, the South Korean Defense Ministry speculated that North Korea may be trying to develop a "hydrogen bomb" and such a device may be North Korea's next weapons test. In January 2016, North Korea claimed to have successfully tested a hydrogen bomb, although only a magnitude 5.1 seismic event was detected at the time of the test, a similar magnitude to the 2013 test of a 6–9 kt (25–38 TJ) atomic bomb. These seismic recordings cast doubt upon North Korea's claim that a hydrogen bomb was tested and suggest it was a non-fusion nuclear test.

On 3 September 2017, the country's state media reported that a hydrogen bomb test was conducted that resulted in "perfect success". According to the US Geological Survey (USGS), the blast released energy equivalent to an earthquake with a seismic magnitude of 6.3, 10 times more powerful than previous nuclear tests conducted by North Korea. US Intelligence released an early assessment that the yield estimate was 140 kt (590 TJ), with an uncertainty range of 70 to 280 kt (290 to 1,170 TJ). On 12 September, NORSAR revised its estimate of the explosion magnitude upward to 6.1, matching that of the CTBTO but less powerful than the USGS estimate of 6.3. Its yield estimate was revised to 250 kt (1,000 TJ), while noting the estimate had some uncertainty and an undisclosed margin of error. On 13 September, an analysis of before and after synthetic-aperture radar satellite imagery of the test site was published suggesting the test occurred under 900 metres (3,000 ft) of rock, and the yield "could have been in excess of 300 kilotons".

== Public knowledge ==
=== Classification ===
Detailed knowledge of fission and fusion weapons is considered classified information to some degree in virtually every industrialized country. In the United States, such knowledge can by default be classified as "Restricted Data", even if it is created by people who are not government employees or associated with weapons programs. Material that is automatically considered classified as soon as it is created is termed born secret, a legal doctrine that has been disputed in cases such as United States v. Progressive, Inc.. The constitutionality of born secret is rarely invoked for cases of private speculation. The official policy of the United States Department of Energy has been not to acknowledge the leaking of design information, as such acknowledgment would potentially validate the information as accurate. In a small number of prior cases, the US government has attempted to censor weapons information in the public press, with limited success. According to the New York Times, physicist Kenneth W. Ford defied government orders to remove classified information from his book Building the H Bomb: A Personal History. Ford claims he used only pre-existing information and even submitted a manuscript to the government, which wanted to remove entire sections of the book for concern that foreign states could use the information.

The Teller–Ulam design was for many years considered one of the top nuclear secrets, and even today it is not discussed in any detail by official publications with origins "behind the fence" of classification. United States Department of Energy (DOE) policy has been, and continues to be, that they do not acknowledge when "leaks" occur, because doing so would acknowledge the accuracy of the supposed leaked information. Aside from images of the warhead casing, most information in the public domain about this design is relegated to a few terse statements by the DOE and the work of a few individual investigators.

=== Unclassified knowledge ===
Though large quantities of vague data have been officially released—and larger quantities of vague data have been unofficially leaked by former bomb designers—most public descriptions of nuclear weapon design details rely to some degree on speculation, reverse engineering from known information, or comparison with similar fields of physics (inertial confinement fusion is the primary example). Such processes have resulted in a body of unclassified knowledge about nuclear bombs that is generally consistent with official unclassified information releases and related physics and is thought to be internally consistent, though there are some points of interpretation that are still considered open. The state of public knowledge about the Teller–Ulam design has been mostly shaped from a few specific incidents outlined in a section below.

==== US Department of Energy statements ====
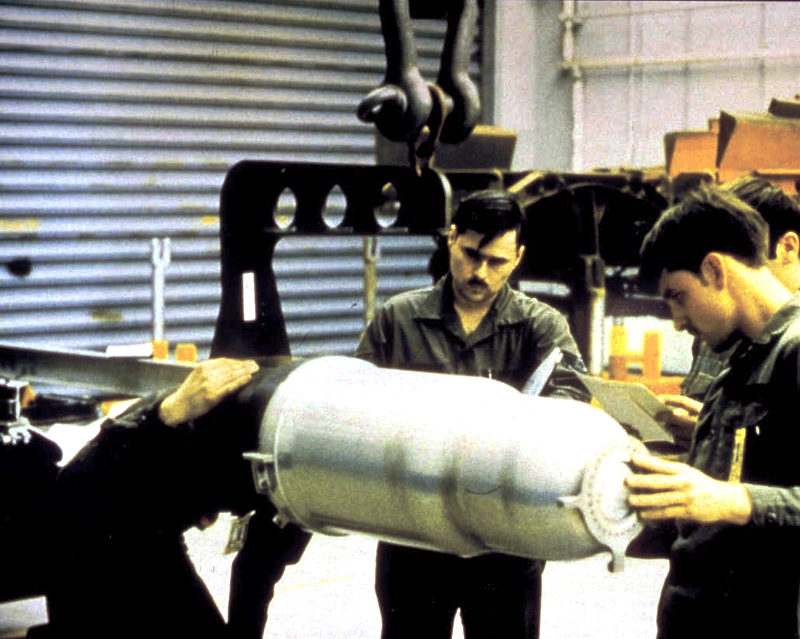
Photographs of warhead casings, such as this one of the W80 nuclear warhead, allow for some speculation as to the relative size and shapes of the primaries and secondaries in US thermonuclear weapons.

In 1972 the United States government declassified a document stating "[I]n thermonuclear (TN) weapons, a fission 'primary' is used to trigger a TN reaction in thermonuclear fuel referred to as a 'secondary'", and in 1979 added, "[I]n thermonuclear weapons, radiation from a fission explosive can be contained and used to transfer energy to compress and ignite a physically separate component containing thermonuclear fuel." To this latter sentence the US government specified that "Any elaboration of this statement will be classified." [emphasis in original] The only information that may pertain to the spark plug or tamper was declassified in 1991: "Fact that fissile or fissionable materials are present in some secondaries, material unidentified, location unspecified, use unspecified, and weapons undesignated." In 1998 the DOE declassified the statement that "The fact that materials may be present in channels and the term 'channel filler', with no elaboration", which may refer to the polystyrene foam (or an analogous substance).

Whether these statements vindicate some or all of the models presented above is up for interpretation, and official US government releases about the technical details of nuclear weapons have been purposely equivocating in the past (e.g., Smyth Report). Other information, such as the types of fuel used in some of the early weapons, has been declassified, though precise technical information has not been.

==== United States v. The Progressive ====
Most of the current ideas on the workings of the Teller–Ulam design came into public awareness after the DOE attempted to censor a magazine article by US anti-weapons activist Howard Morland in 1979 on the "secret of the hydrogen bomb". In 1978, Morland had decided that discovering and exposing this "last remaining secret" would focus attention onto the arms race and allow citizens to feel empowered to question official statements on the importance of nuclear weapons and nuclear secrecy. Most of Morland's ideas about how the weapon worked were compiled from accessible sources: the drawings that most inspired his approach came from the Encyclopedia Americana. Morland also interviewed (often informally) many former Los Alamos scientists (including Teller and Ulam, though neither gave him any useful information), and he used a variety of interpersonal strategies to encourage informative responses from them (i.e., asking questions such as "Do they still use spark plugs?" even if he was not aware what the latter term specifically referred to).

Morland eventually concluded that the "secret" was that the primary and secondary were kept separate and that radiation pressure from the primary compressed the secondary before igniting it. When an early draft of the article, to be published in The Progressive magazine, was sent to the DOE after falling into the hands of a professor who was opposed to Morland's goal, the DOE requested that the article not be published and pressed for a temporary injunction. The DOE argued that Morland's information was (1) likely derived from classified sources, (2) if not derived from classified sources, itself counted as "secret" information under the "born secret" clause of the 1954 Atomic Energy Act, and (3) was dangerous and would encourage nuclear proliferation. Morland and his lawyers disagreed on all points, but the injunction was granted, as the judge in the case felt that it was safer to grant the injunction and allow Morland, et al., to appeal.

Through a variety of more complicated circumstances, the DOE case began to wane as it became clear that some of the data they were attempting to claim as "secret" had been published in a students' encyclopedia a few years earlier. After another H-bomb speculator, Chuck Hansen, had his own ideas about the "secret" (quite different from Morland's) published in a Wisconsin newspaper, the DOE claimed that The Progressive case was moot, dropped its suit, and allowed the magazine to publish its article, which it did in November 1979. Morland had by then, however, changed his opinion of how the bomb worked, suggesting that a foam medium (the polystyrene) rather than radiation pressure was used to compress the secondary, and that in the secondary there was a spark plug of fissile material as well. He published these changes, based in part on the proceedings of the appeals trial, as a short erratum in The Progressive a month later. In 1981, Morland published a book about his experience, describing in detail the train of thought that led him to his conclusions about the "secret".

Morland's work is interpreted as being at least partially correct because the DOE had sought to censor it, one of the few times they violated their usual approach of not acknowledging "secret" material that had been released; however, to what degree it lacks information, or has incorrect information, is not known with any confidence. The difficulty that other countries had in developing the Teller–Ulam design (even when they apparently understood the design, such as with the United Kingdom) makes it somewhat unlikely that this simple information alone is what provides the ability to manufacture thermonuclear weapons. Nevertheless, the ideas put forward by Morland in 1979 have been the basis for all the current speculation on the Teller–Ulam design.

== Notable accidents ==
On 5 February 1958, during a training mission flown by a B-47, a Mark 15 nuclear bomb, also known as the Tybee Bomb, was lost off the coast of Tybee Island near Savannah, Georgia. The US Air Force maintains that the bomb was unarmed and did not contain the live fissile core necessary to initiate a nuclear explosion. The bomb was thought by the Department of Energy to lie buried under several feet of silt at the bottom of Wassaw Sound.

On 17 January 1966, a fatal collision occurred between a B-52G and a KC-135 Stratotanker over Palomares, Spain. The conventional explosives in two of the Mk28-type hydrogen bombs detonated upon impact with the ground, dispersing plutonium over nearby farms. A third bomb landed intact near Palomares while the fourth fell 19 kilometres (12 mi) off the coast into the Mediterranean sea and was recovered a few months later.

On 21 January 1968, a B-52G, with four B28FI thermonuclear bombs aboard as part of Operation Chrome Dome, crashed on the ice of the North Star Bay while attempting an emergency landing at Thule Air Base in Greenland. The resulting fire caused extensive radioactive contamination. Personnel involved in the cleanup failed to recover all the debris from three of the bombs, and one bomb was not recovered.

== See also ==
- COLEX process (isotopic separation)
- NUKEMAP
- Pure fusion weapon
