= Project 596L =

1966 Chinese atmospheric nuclear test

596L
- The cloud beginning to mushroom following air drop detonation

Information
- Country: China
- Test site: Lop Nur Test Base
- Date: May 9, 1966
- Test type: Atmospheric
- Device type: Layer cake design
- Yield: 220 kilotons of TNT (920 TJ)

Test chronology

596L (CIA designation: CHIC-3) was the third nuclear weapon test conducted by the People's Republic of China. Detonated on May 9, 1966, at Lop Nur, it was the first Chinese test to use thermonuclear reactions in a layer cake design, and yielded 220 kilotons of TNT. As part of the Two Bombs, One Satellite project, it was conducted as a physics experiment to verify computational simulation for China's development of true (multi-stage) thermonuclear weapons.

== Design ==
An example of a typical layer cake design, the British Green Bamboo concept. The 596L design is believed to be very similar.: 1. High-explosive lenses; 2. Natural or depleted uranium; 3. Lithium deuteride; 4. Highly enriched uranium; 5. Void (hollow pit design)

The device was named 596L as it used a similar fission core to the first Chinese nuclear test, the implosion bomb Project 596, but with the addition of [L]ithium deuteride thermonuclear fuel. This fuel was produced at a production plant in Baotou, constructed with Soviet assistance from 1958.

During 1961 and 1962 the Chinese thermonuclear weapons program was limited to general theoretical research. In 1963, scientists led by Peng Huanwu extensively investigated the sloika or layer cake design. This was provided at some point during Soviet assistance to Chinese nuclear development, terminated in 1960. The Soviets had tested such a design in RDS-6s (400 kt) in 1953 and RDS-27 (250 kt) in 1955. The design surrounded a fissile core (highly enriched uranium) with alternating concentric spherical layers of lithium deuteride and natural uranium. Under compression from the exploding fissile core, limited thermonuclear reactions in lithium deuteride would begin in the lithium deuteride. These would emit very high energy neutrons, triggering fast fission in the natural uranium, contributing to the fission explosion.

By 1964, Chinese nuclear scientists knew the layer cake design was too inefficient to be the hydrogen bomb possessed by other countries. Nonetheless, plans were made to test a small layer cake designs in 1966 and "658", a three-staged layer cake design capable of reaching one megaton (similar to the British backup design Orange Herald Large), in October 1967.

In September and October 1965, a theoretical research crash project ran in Shanghai led by Yu Min, using digital computers and manual calculation. Yu held a lecture series on the layer cake bomb, and in doing so realized its flaw was its slow production of tritium from lithium deuteride i.e. the Jetter cycle. This resulted in a Teller-Ulam analogue design for compression of a thermonuclear secondary by a fission primary. In December 1965, this design was selected as the focus of thermonuclear development. Despite this, 596L remained scheduled. The primary purpose of the test would now be to make the first physical observations of thermonuclear reactions, in order to verify computation codes used in two-stage hydrogen bomb design.

== Test ==
The device was dropped from a Xi'an H-6 bomber over Lop Nur test site on May 9, 1966, and yielded 220 kilotons of TNT.

== Reactions ==
People's Daily front page following the test. The headline reads: "Our country successfully carried out a nuclear explosion containing thermonuclear materials".

The test received global coverage. Third World countries typically congratulated the government of China, while Western and Eastern Bloc countries condemned Chinese nuclear proliferation.

The Soviet TASS news agency reported that the device used thermonuclear materials. Pakistan Atomic Energy Commission noted that a hydrogen bomb test had not yet been carried out by France. South Korean media also reported it as the test of a thermonuclear or hydrogen bomb.
