= Fast fission =

Fission from a high energy neutron

Fast fission is fission that occurs when a heavy atom absorbs a high-energy neutron, called a fast neutron, and splits. Most fissionable materials need thermal neutrons, which move more slowly.

== Fast reactors vs. thermal reactors ==
Fast neutron reactors use fast fission to produce energy, unlike most nuclear reactors. In a conventional reactor, a moderator is needed to slow down the neutrons so that they are more likely to fission atoms. A fast neutron reactor uses fast neutrons, so it does not use a moderator. In a thermal reactor, some neutrons are also absorbed in the moderator itself, and fast fission produces a higher average number of neutrons per fission, so fast reactors have better neutron economy making a plutonium breeder reactor possible. However, a fast neutron reactor must use relatively highly enriched uranium or plutonium at the reactor startup so that the neutrons have a better chance of fissioning atoms.

== Fast fission factor ==
In thermal reactor theory, fast fission is quantified by the fast fission factor $\varepsilon.$ Physically, it compares the neutron production rate over all energies with the rate from thermal neutrons alone (up to 1 eV). Masterson writes the definition as:

$$\varepsilon = \frac{\int \Sigma_{\text{f}}(E)_{\text{fuel}} \, \phi(E)_{\text{fuel}} \, dE}{\int \Sigma_{\text{f}}(E')_{\text{fuel}} \, \phi(E')_{\text{fuel}} \, dE'} \times \left( \frac{\phi_{\text{fE}'}}{\phi_{\text{fE}}} \right).$$

The denominator is integrated over thermal energies only, the numerator over all energies, and the flux factor is the ratio of the thermal neutron flux in the fuel to the total flux in the fuel. The value depends most strongly on the type of fuel: for uranium-fueled light-water reactors $\varepsilon$ ranges from about 1.02 to 1.08, averaging about 1.03 in a fuel assembly at 3% to 4% enrichment. A heterogeneous arrangement of fuel and moderator always yields a higher factor than a homogeneous mixture; the value rises with fuel-rod diameter but, for fixed rod size, barely depends on rod placement. Higher-energy neutrons also produce more neutrons per fission: the average multiplicity $\nu$ is approximately linear in incident neutron energy, gaining about one extra neutron for every 6 to 7 MeV above 1 MeV.

== Fissionable but not fissile ==
Some atoms, notably uranium-238, do not usually undergo fission when struck by slow neutrons, but will split if struck with neutrons with enough energy. The fast neutrons produced in a hydrogen bomb by fusion of deuterium and tritium have even higher energy than the fast neutrons produced in a nuclear reactor. This makes it possible to increase the yield of any given fusion weapon by simply adding layers of cheap natural (or even depleted) uranium. Fast fission of uranium-238 provides a large part of the explosive yield and fallout in many hydrogen bomb designs.

== Differences in fission product yield ==
A graph of fission product yield against the mass number of the fission fragments has two pronounced but fairly flat peaks, at around 90 to 100, and 130 to 140. With thermal neutrons, yields of fission products with mass between the peaks, such as ^{113m}Cd, ^{119m}Sn, ^{121m}Sn, ^{123}Sn, ^{125}Sb, ^{126}Sn, and ^{127}Sb are very low.

The higher the energy of the state that undergoes nuclear fission, the more likely a symmetric fission is, hence as the neutron energy increases and/or the energy of the fissioning atom increases, the valley between the two peaks becomes more shallow. For instance, the curve of yield against mass for ^{235}U has a shallower valley for 14 MeV neutrons than for thermal neutrons. The curves for the fission of the later actinides tend to make even more shallow valleys. In extreme cases such as ^{259}Fm, only one peak is seen.
