= RDS-6s =

1953 Soviet atmospheric nuclear test

Coordinates: 50°26′16″N 77°48′51″E

Joe-4 RDS-6s

Information
- Country: Soviet Union
- Test site: Semipalatinsk Test Site, Kazakh SSR
- Period: August 1953
- Number of tests: 1
- Test type: Atmospheric test
- Device type: Boosted fission
- Max. yield: Total yield 400 kilotons of TNT (1,700 TJ)

Test chronology

RDS-6s (Russian: РДС-6с; CIA designation: JOE 4) was the first Soviet test of a boosted fission weapon that occurred on August 12, 1953, that detonated with an energy equivalent to 400 kilotons of TNT.

RDS-6 utilized a scheme in which fission and fusion fuel (lithium-6 deuteride) were "layered", a design known as the Sloika (Russian: Слойка, named after a type of layered puff pastry) or the so-called layer cake design, model in the Soviet Union. A ten-fold increase in explosive power was achieved by a combination of fusion and fission, yet it was still 26 times less powerful than the Ivy Mike device tested by the US in 1952. A similar design was earlier theorized by Edward Teller, but never tested by the US, as the "Alarm Clock".

== Description ==
The Soviet Union started studies of advanced nuclear bombs and a hydrogen bomb, code named RDS-6, in June 1948. The studies would be done by KB-11 (usually referred to as Arzamas-16, the name of the town) and FIAN. The first hydrogen bomb design was the Truba (Russian: Труба, pipe/cylinder) (RDS-6t)). In March 1948 Klaus Fuchs had provided the USSR with documents of the US 'Classical Super'. In these documents the classical super was described as consisting of a gun-type uranium-235 primary with beryllium oxide tamper and a secondary consisting of a long cylinder with deuterium, doped with tritium near the primary. The design of the RDS-6t was similar to this classical super. The difference was that the light shell of beryllium oxide was replaced by a heavy shell. The assumption was that the deuterium tritium mixture could be easily heated and compressed, and the shock would start the thermonuclear reaction prematurely. A heavy shell opaque to radiation would prevent this unwanted preheating more than the light shell.

In September-October 1948 Andrei Sakharov, working in FIAN, came up with a competing idea of alternating layers of deuterium and uranium-238 around a fissile core (Sakharov's 'first idea'). This second design was code named "Sloika," referring to a kind of Russian layered puff pastry bun. In March 1949 Vitaly Ginzburg proposed to replace the deuterium by lithium-6 deuteride (his 'second idea'). The proposal was based on the better efficiency due to the generation of tritium by the neutron capture of lithium and the uranium-238 fission by the 14 MeV neutrons from D + T fusion. At that time Ginzburg did not know that the cross section for a D–T reaction was much larger than that for the D–D reaction. In April 1949 the group received D–T cross section data obtained from intelligence gathering without mentioning the source. The large advantage of lithium-6 deuteride became evident and the deuterium design was abandoned. Both the 'first' and 'second' idea were used in the RDS-6s. The result was similar to the US 'Alarm Clock', but there is no indication that the Soviets were aware of the concept of the 'Alarm Clock'. After the United States tested Ivy Mike in November 1952, Lavrentiy Beria sent a memo to spare no effort on the development of the RDS-6s. In the final development report from June 1953 the yield was estimated at 300±100 kilotons.

Diagram of deuterium–tritium fusion, a reaction that took place in RDS-6s. The emitted fast neutrons (kinetic energy 14 MeV) stimulate fission of the uranium-238.

The RDS-6s was tested on August 12, 1953 (Joe 4). The measured yield was 400 kilotons, 10% from fission of the uranium-235 core, 15–20% from fusion and 70–75% from fission of the uranium-238 layers.

After the successful test Sakharov proposed a more powerful version of the RDS-6s, code named RDS-6sD. Attempts to increase the yield of the RDS-6s however proved unfeasible.

In December 1953, all research on the RDS-6t was also stopped after it was proven that thermonuclear ignition was not possible in the RDS-6t. Both the RDS-6s and the RDS-6t were dead ends and research focused again on a two-stage thermonuclear weapon.

Despite the inability of the RDS-6s to be scaled into the megaton range, the detonation was still used by Soviet diplomats as leverage. The Soviets claimed that they too had a hydrogen bomb, but unlike the United States' first thermonuclear device, theirs was deployable by air. The Soviet claim did not fool the American scientists: their fallout analysis demonstrated to them that the Soviet device was similar to Teller's Alarm Clock concept. The United States didn't develop a deployable version of the hydrogen bomb until five months after the RDS-6s test, in 1954. (Note: Five deliverable versions of Mike were built as the TX-16/EC-16 in January 1954 and retired four months later, followed by the EC 17 and EC 24 bombs (five and ten units respectively) in April through October of 1954)

== Legacy ==
=== RDS-27 ===
The Soviet Union later tested RDS-27, a modification of RDS-6s to use only lithium deuteride, without the expensive tritium, allowing mass production. This improved the operational usefulness of the RDS-27 but reduced the yield from 400 kilotons to 250 kilotons. The RDS-27 was intended as a warhead for the R-7 ICBM. The RDS-27 was tested November 6, in the 1955 nuclear test series. The US Central Intelligence Agency, which designated the test "JOE 18", estimated its yield at 200 kilotons and recognized it as the weaponized version of JOE 4.

=== RDS-37 ===
The first Soviet test of a "true" hydrogen bomb was on November 22, 1955, under the directive of Nikolai Bulganin (influenced by Nikita Khrushchev), code-named RDS-37. All were at Semipalatinsk Test Site, Kazakh SSR. Like RDS-6, it was a "dry" weapon, using lithium-6 deuteride instead of liquid deuterium.

== See also ==
- 2013 Chelyabinsk meteor airburst, whose estimated explosive force slightly exceeded the RDS-6s test's energy
- Joe 1
- Soviet atomic bomb project
- Castle Bravo
- 596L
