= Science China (journal) =

Scientific journal serious

- Discipline: Science
- Language: English, Chinese

Publication details
- Former names: Scientia Sinica, Science in China
- History: 1950-present
- Publisher: Springer Nature, Science China Magazine Press
- Frequency: monthly

Standard abbreviations
- ISO 4: Sci. China

Links
- Journal homepage

Science China (simplified Chinese: 中国科学; traditional Chinese: 中國科學; pinyin: Zhōngguó Kēxué), also known as "Science in China " or "Scientia Sinica" in Latin, is an academic journal jointly sponsored by the Chinese Academy of Sciences and the National Natural Science Foundation of China. Founded in 1950 as a quarterly in Chinese, the journal has developed into a series of monthly peer-reviewed journals in Chinese and English languages, covering the major disciplines in natural sciences and engineering. It is published by the Science China Press in cooperation with Springer Nature, and indexed in SCI and Scopus. Science China has published many important scientific research results from China, such as the artificial synthesis of crystalline bovine insulin by the Shanghai Institute of Biochemistry, and Chen Jingrun's research on Goldbach's conjecture. However, since the 1990s, Science China has faced a shortage of high-quality manuscripts.

== History ==
=== Establishment to cessation ===
Science China traces its origins to the Scientia Sinica (中國科學), a Chinese quarterly journal founded in 1950 by the Chinese Academy of Sciences. At that time, the People's Republic of China had just been established and there were few academic journals in various disciplines. Therefore, Scientia Sinica was positioned as a comprehensive academic journal in Chinese.

At the end of 1951, given that academic journals of various subjects had been established and most of them were in Chinese, the Chinese Academy of Sciences decided to cease publication of the Chinese version of Scientia Sinica. In October of the following year, Scientia Sinica (English version, quarterly) was launched to introduce scientific achievements in China to the world. Science Record (English version) merged into Scientia Sinica (English version).

In 1957, Scientia Sinica was changed to a bimonthly publication, and the following year it was changed to a monthly publication.

In July 1960, the Central Committee of the Chinese Communist Party ordered all publications in the country to cease publication for rectification and to conduct quality and confidentiality inspections. Scientia Sinica ceased publication and resumed publication in November of the same year.

During this period, well-known scientists such as Qian Xuesen, Yun Ziqiang, Wu Youxun, Bei Shizhang, and Zhang Wenyu served as editors-in-chief and deputy editors-in-chief of the journal. The English brief report and full text on the artificial synthesis of bovine insulin crystals by the Shanghai Institute of Biochemistry of the Chinese Academy of Sciences, the Shanghai Institute of Organic Chemistry of the Chinese Academy of Sciences, and the Department of Chemistry of Peking University were published in Scientia Sinica.

In 1966, due to the Cultural Revolution, Scientia Sinica ceased publication after six issues.

=== Resumption and beyond ===
From March to July 1971, the State Council of the People's Republic of China held a national conference on publishing work in Beijing. On December 12, 1971, the Chinese Academy of Sciences held an office meeting and, in accordance with the spirit of the National Publishing Work Conference, decided to resume the publication of Scientia Sinica.

In January 1973, Scientia Sinica officially resumed publication, as a quarterly journal in both Chinese and English versions.

In January 1974, the journal changed from a quarterly to a bimonthly publication.

In 1979, both the Chinese and English versions of Scientia Sinica became monthly journals.

In January 1982, both the Chinese and English versions of the journal were divided into series A (including math, physics, chemistry, technological sciences, and astronomy) and series B (including biology, agriculture, medicine, and geophysics).

In 1989, the English version of Scientia Sinica was renamed "Science in China".

In 1992, the Science in China Series won the first prize of the National Excellent Journal Award and the Overall Excellence Award (highest award) in Beijing.

In 1993, only nine journals from China were indexed by SCI, in which Science in China Series A and B accounted for two.

In 1995, the Science in China Press was established based on the editorial offices of Science in China and Chinese Science Bulletin.

In 1996, Science in China was branched into five sub-journals: A (mathematics, physics, and astronomy; monthly), B (chemistry; bimonthly), C ( life sciences, including biology, agriculture, and medicine; bimonthly), D (earth sciences; bimonthly), and E (technological sciences, including material, computer, automation and electronics; bimonthly).

In 1997, Science in China won the first prize of the National Excellent Journal Award.

In 1998, according to the statistics on impact factors in 1997, Science in China Series B ranked second among comprehensive journals in China, and Science in China Series A ranked third.

In 2000, all the published contents of Science in China were available online.

In 2001, Science in China Series F-Information Sciences (bimonthly) was launched. In the same year, Science in China was included as Double-high Journals (high academic quality and high international impact) in the “Chinese Journal Matrix” sponsored by the Press and Publication Administration of China and the Ministry of Science and Technology of China.

In 2003, Science in China Series G-Physics and Astronomy was branched from Science in China Series A.

By 2008, all journals in Science in China were published monthly.

In 2010, Science in China was renamed "Science China", and the series numbers of "A, B, C etc." of the member journals were deleted. Since then, the journals have been published in cooperation with Springer Nature to expand international distribution.

In December 2014, the English edition of Science China: Materials Science was launched. By then, the Science China series had 7 Chinese editions and 8 English editions, totaling 15 publications.

== Important reports ==
After its resumption, Science China published some important scientific research results from China. In 1973, the second issue of the Chinese edition of Science in China published in full Chen Jingrun's research on Goldbach's conjecture. This work later won the first prize of the National Natural Science Award in 1982. This issue also published Zhu Kezhen's "A Preliminary Study on Climate Change in China over the Past Five Thousand Years".

Hou Zhenting's "Uniqueness Criterion of Q-Processes" published in the second issue of 1974, solved a problem that had remained unresolved in probability theory for 40 years, for which Hou Zhenting received the Davidson Prize in 1976.

Gu Chaohao and Yang Zhenning's research articles on gauge field theory were published in the fifth issue of 1975 and the sixth issue of 1976

Wu Wenjun's research on the machine proof of theorems later known as the Wu elimination method, was published in the sixth issue of 1977.

The research on molybdenum catalysts in the oxidative dehydrogenation of butene by the Lanzhou Institute of Chemical Physics, Chinese Academy of Sciences, published in the fifth issue of 1978, has been widely applied in the field of synthetic rubber. In December, the journal published a series of articles reporting the successful synthesis of nucleic acids in China.

The Chinese and English versions of Wu Yongshi and George Parrish's "Perturbation Theory Without Fixed Gauges" were published in the 12th issue of 1980 and the 4th issue of 1981.

Que Duanlin et al.'s "Depressurized Nitrogen-Protected Czochralski Silicon Single Crystal Growth" published in Scientia Sinica in February 1991, was later rated as one of the top ten achievements in China that year by Science and Technology Daily.

However, after the mid-1990s, excellent Chinese scientific papers gradually flowed to foreign journals, and Science China faced a shortage of high-quality manuscripts.

== Member journals ==
The Science China family includes the following journals:

=== English journals ===
- SCIENCE CHINA Mathematics
- SCIENCE CHINA Chemistry
- SCIENCE CHINA Life Sciences
- SCIENCE CHINA Earth Sciences
- SCIENCE CHINA Technological Sciences
- SCIENCE CHINA Information Sciences
- SCIENCE CHINA Physics, Mechanics & Astronomy
- SCIENCE CHINA Materials

=== Chinese journals with English abstracts ===
- SCIENTIA SINICA Mathematica
- SCIENTIA SINICA Chimica
- SCIENTIA SINICA Vitae
- SCIENTIA SINICA Terrae
- SCIENTIA SINICA Technologica
- SCIENTIA SINICA Informationis
- SCIENTIA SINICA Physica, Mechanica & Astronomica

Each journal publishes original research articles, reviews, and letters in its research area(s). And all the English journals are indexed in major databases including Science Citation Index Expanded (SCI) and Scopus. Some have achieved high impact factors; for example, Science China: Chemistry and Science China: Information Sciences won impact factors of 9.8 and 7.6 respectively in 2024.

== See also ==
- Chinese Academy of Sciences
- Academia Sinica
- National Natural Science Foundation of China
- Science Bulletin
- Science Record
- Academic publishing in China
