= Wang Ganchang =

Chinese nuclear physicist (1907–1998)

Wang Ganchang 王淦昌
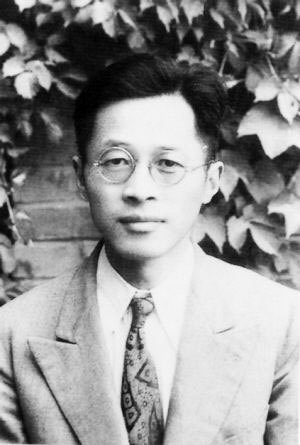
- Wang in the early 1950s
- Born: May 28, 1907; Changshu, Jiangsu, Qing dynasty
- Died: December 10, 1998 (aged 91); Beijing, China
- Education: Tsinghua University; University of Berlin
- Known for: Discovering the anti-sigma minus hyperon particle
- Awards: JINR Prize (1961); State Natural Science Award (1982); State Science and Technology Progress Award (1985); Two Bombs, One Satellite Award (1999)
- Scientific career
- Fields: Nuclear physics
- Workplaces: Shandong University; Zhejiang University; Institute of Modern Physics; Joint Institute for Nuclear Research; Chinese nuclear weapons program
- Doctoral advisor: Lise Meitner

Wang Ganchang
- Chinese: 王淦昌
Transcriptions
Standard Mandarin
- Hanyu Pinyin: Wáng Gànchāng
- Wade–Giles: Wang^{2} Kan^{4}-ch'ang^{1}
- IPA: [wǎŋ kân.ʈʂʰáŋ]

Wang Ganchang (Chinese: 王淦昌; pinyin: Wáng Gànchāng; Wade–Giles: Wang Kan-ch'ang; May 28, 1907 – December 10, 1998) was a Chinese nuclear physicist. He was one of the founding fathers of Chinese nuclear physics, cosmic rays and particle physics. Wang was also a leader in the fields of detonation physics experiments, anti-electromagnetic pulse technology, nuclear explosion detection, anti-nuclear radiation technology, and laser stimulated nuclear explosion technologies.

For his numerous contributions, Wang is considered among the top leaders, pioneers and scientists of the Chinese nuclear weapons program. He was elected a member of the Chinese Academy of Sciences, and was a member of the Chinese Communist Party.

In 1930, Wang first proposed the use of a cloud chamber to study a new type of high-energy ray induced by the bombardment of beryllium with α particles. In 1941 Wang first proposed the use of beta-capture to detect the neutrino. James Allen employed his suggestion and found evidence for the existence of the neutrino in 1942. Frederick Reines and Clyde Cowan detected the neutrino via the inverse beta-decay reaction in 1956, for which, forty years later, Reines was awarded the 1995 Nobel Prize in Physics.

Wang also led a group which discovered the anti-sigma minus hyperon particle at the Joint Institute for Nuclear Research, Dubna, Russia in 1959.

After May 1950, Wang became researcher and vice-director of the Institute of Modern Physics. He was also vice-director of the Soviet Joint Institute for Nuclear Research.

From spring of 1969 onwards, Wang held many high-level positions within Chinese academic and political organizations. He was vice-director of the Ninth Research Institute (二机部第九研究院), predecessor of the China Academy of Engineering Physics, director of the China Institute of Atomic Energy, deputy director of the Nuclear industry Science and Technology Commission (核工业部科技委), and second vice-chairman of the China Association for Science and Technology. He was also vice-chairman of the Chinese Physical Society and the first chairman of the Chinese Nuclear Society. Within the political sphere he was a member of the 3rd through 16th National People's Congress Standing Committees of the Chinese government.

In 2000, the Chinese Physical Society established five prizes in recognition of five pioneers of modern physics in China. The Wang Ganchang Prize is awarded to physicists in particle physics and inertial confinement fusion.

== Early years ==
Wang Ganchang was born in Zhitang (支塘镇枫塘湾), Changshu, Jiangsu Province on May 28, 1907. In 1924, he graduated from Pudong High School (浦东中学) in Shanghai. Subsequently, he studied English for six months while driving and repairing cars to sustain himself. He passed the entrance examinations for Tsinghua University in August 1928.

He graduated from the Physics Department of Tsinghua in June 1929, and served as an assistant professor from 1929 to 1930. In his thesis "On the daily change of radon gas" (《清华园周围氡气的强度及每天的变化》), he was the first Chinese scientist to publish on atmospheric research and radioactive experiments.

== Overseas student in Germany ==
In 1930 he went to study at the University of Berlin in Germany. As soon as he arrived in Berlin, he became aware of the Bothe report (博特报告) relating to the emission of a new type of high-energy neutral radiation induced by the bombardment of beryllium with α particles from a radioactive polonium source, which was non-ionizing but even more penetrating than the strongest gamma rays derived from radium. These were (wrongly) presumed to be gamma rays.

Wang suggested the use of a cloud chamber to study these particles. However, he could not perform this experiment during his time in Germany, since he lacked the support of his supervisor Lise Meitner. Instead, it was conducted one year later by the English physicist James Chadwick, who discovered a new type of particle, the neutron. Chadwick was subsequently awarded the 1935 Nobel Prize in Physics.

During or after his time in Germany, Wang worked briefly at UC Berkeley in the United States.

In 1934, Wang Ganchang received his Ph.D. with a thesis on β decay spectrum (German: Über die β-Spektren von ThB+C+C; Chinese:《ThB+C+C的β能谱》) under the supervision of Meitner. He returned to China in April of that year.

== Upon his return to China ==
He first worked at Shandong University as a physics professor from 1934 to 1936. He then became a professor at Zhejiang University and served as head of the Department of Physics there from October 1936 to 1950.

== During World War II ==
After the Marco Polo Bridge Incident in July 1937, the Japanese invasion of China forced Wang and other professors to retreat with all the faculty of Zhejiang University to the western mountainous rural areas of China to escape capture. Despite the difficult conditions, he nonetheless tried in 1939 to find evidence of tracks of nuclear fission caused by neutron bombardment of cadmium acid on photographic film.

In 1941, he first proposed an experiment to prove the existence of the neutrino by capturing K-electrons in nuclear reactions. Unfortunately, due to the war he was unable to conduct this experiment. Instead, fifteen years later in 1956, Frederick Reines and Clyde Cowan detected the neutrino through a different method involving the inverse beta-decay reaction. Forty years later, they were awarded the 1995 Nobel Prize in Physics.

== After the founding of the People's Republic of China ==
From April 1950 to 1956 Wang was a researcher at the Institute of Modern Physics at the Chinese Academy of Sciences and served as the Institute's deputy director from 1952. There, with the invitation of fellow researcher Qian Sanqiang, he began studies of cosmic-rays with a circular 12-feet cloud chamber. In 1952, he designed a magnetic cloud chamber.

Professor Wang was the first to propose the establishment of a cosmic ray laboratory in China. From 1953 to 1956, he directed the Luoxue Mountain Cosmic Rays Research Center (落雪山宇宙线实验站) located 3185 meters above sea level in the mountainous region of Yunnan province.

His study of cosmic-rays lead him to publish his findings on neutral-meson decay in 1955. By 1957 he had collected more than 700 recordings of new types of particles.

== The USSR years ==
In order to develop the field of high energy physics in China, in 1956 the Chinese government began to send experts to the Joint Institute for Nuclear Research at Dubna in the Soviet Union to do field work and carry out preliminary design of particle accelerators. The agreement on the establishment of JINR was signed on March 26, 1956 in Moscow, with Wang Ganchang as one of the founders.

On April 4, 1956, Wang went to the USSR to help plan the long-term development of the peaceful utilization of atomic energy. Later, many Chinese students went to the Soviet Union to study the technology of accelerator and detector construction. Using this technology, the experimental group led by Professor Wang Ganchang in Dubna analysed more than 40,000 photographs which recorded tens of thousands of nuclear interactions taken in the propane bubble chamber produced by a 10 GeV synchrophasotron used to bombard a target forming high energy mesons. On March 9, 1960 they were the first to discover anti-sigma minus hyperon particles (反西格马负超子).

$$\pi^- + C\to \bar\Sigma^- + K^0 + \bar K^0 + K^- + p^+ + \pi^+ + \pi^- + \text{nucleus recoil}$$

The discovery of this new unstable antiparticle, which decays in (1.18±0.07)·10^{−10} s into an antineutron and a negative pion, was announced in September of that year.

$$\bar\Sigma^-\to \bar n^0 +  \pi^-$$

Initially there was no doubt that this particle was an elementary particle. However, a few years later this hyperon, along with the proton, the neutron, the pion and other hadrons had all lost their status as elementary particles when they turned out to be complex particles consisting of quarks and antiquarks.

Wang remained affiliated with the Joint Institute for Nuclear Research even after returning to China, serving as its deputy director from 1958 until 1960.

== Nuclear weapons ==
After his return to China in 1958, Wang agreed to participate in the Chinese nuclear program to develop an atomic bomb, which meant giving up his research on elementary particles for the next 17 years. Within one year he had conducted more than one thousand detonation experiments at the foot of the Great Wall, in the Yanshan Mountains, Huailai county, Hebei province.

In 1963 he moved to a site within the Qinghai Plateau more than 3000 meters above sea level to continue polymerization detonation experiments. He then relocated to the Taklamakan desert in Xinjiang province to prepare for China's first nuclear test.

On October 16, 1964 the first atomic bomb test (code-named "596") was conducted successfully, making China a nuclear-weapons state.

Less than three years later, on June 17, 1967 the first hydrogen bomb test (code-named "Test No. 6") was conducted successfully. This shocked the world since China had not only managed to break the nuclear monopoly of the two superpowers, but had developed this technology even before some major Western powers such as France.

In spring 1969, Wang was one of several scientists who spoke with an Australian journalist about China's nuclear weapons programme.

That year, as part of his duties as vice-director of the Ninth Research Institute (二机部第九研究院), Wang received the task of conducting China's first underground nuclear test. Due to severe high altitude hypoxia brought on by the test location, he had to carry an oxygen tank while at work. The first underground test was successfully conducted on September 22, 1969. Wang also led the second and third Chinese underground nuclear tests.

== Nuclear fusion and nuclear energy ==
In 1964, the Shanghai Optical Machinery Institute (上海光学精密机械研究所) of the Chinese Academy of Sciences developed a high-power 10 MW output laser. In late December of the same year, Wang proposed to the State Council to use high-power laser beam targeting in order to achieve inertial confinement fusion, an idea simultaneously (but independently) developed by his Soviet counterpart Nikolai Gennadievich Basov. For this contribution, Wang is known as the founder of Chinese laser fusion technology.

Unfortunately, due to the political turmoil of the Cultural Revolution, which caused seven years of delay, Wang's leading position in this field was lost.

By the end of 1978, his inertial confinement fusion research group established by the Atomic Energy began the construction of a high-current accelerator. As an advocate of nuclear energy, and with four other nuclear experts in October 1978, Wang proposed the development of nuclear power in China. In 1980, he promoted a plan to build 20 nuclear power plants at various locations including Qinshan, Zhejiang Province, Daya Bay, and Guangzhou.

== Project 863 ==
On March 3, 1986, Wang Ganchang, Wang Daheng, Yang Jiachi and Chen Fangyun first proposed in a letter (《关于跟踪世界战略性高科技发展的建议》) to the Chinese government that China should research weapons utilizing lasers and microwaves, as well as electromagnetic pulse weapons. Wang's plan was adopted in November of that year under the code name Project 863 ("863计划"). As an ongoing program, it has produced several notable developments including the Loongson computer processor family (originally named Godson), the Tianhe supercomputers, and aspects of the Shenzhou spacecraft.

== Awards ==
Wang was the first recipient of the State Natural Science Award in 1982. He was also the first recipient of the Special Award of the State Science and Technology Progress Award (国家科技进步奖特等奖) in 1985.

In September 1999, Wang and Qian Sanqiang jointly received the special prize Two Bombs, One Satellite Meritorious Award for their contributions to the Chinese nuclear program. It was granted to them posthumously by the State Council, the Central Committee of the Communist Party, and the Central Military Commission.

== See also ==
- Chinese atomic bomb
- Chinese hydrogen bomb
- Nuclear testing
- Underground nuclear testing
- Wang Pu (a Chinese student PhD student who worked with Lise Meitner shortly after Wang Ganchang)

== Selected literature by Wang Ganchang ==
German (as K. C. Wang)

- —— (1932). "Über die obere Grenze des kontinuierlichen β-Strahlspektrums von RaE". Zeitschrift für Physik. 74 (11–12): 744–747. Bibcode:1932ZPhy...74..744W. doi:10.1007/BF01340423. S2CID 121999700.
- —— (1934). "Über die β-Spektren von ThB + C + C". Zeitschrift für Physik. 87 (9–10): 633–646. Bibcode:1932ZPhy...74..744W. doi:10.1007/BF01340423. S2CID 121999700.

English (as K. C. Wang)

- —— (1942). "A suggestion on the detection of the neutrino". Physical Review. 61 (1–2): 97. Bibcode:1942PhRv...61...97W. doi:10.1103/PhysRev.61.97.
- ——; Tsao, H. L. (1944). "An attempt at finding the relationship between the nuclear force and the gravitational force". Physical Review. 66 (5–6): 155. Bibcode:1944PhRv...66..155W. doi:10.1103/PhysRev.66.155.
- —— (1945). "A suggestion on a new experimental method for cosmic-ray particles". Science Record. 1: 387.
- ——; Chiang, T. L. (1945). "A suggestion on a new experimental method for cosmic-ray particles". Science Record. 1: 389.
- —— (1945). "Radioactivity of the neutron". Nature. 155 (3941): 574. Bibcode:1945Natur.155..574W. doi:10.1038/155574a0.
- ——; Cheng, K. C. (1946). "A five-dimensional field theory". Physical Review. 70 (7–8): 516–518. Bibcode:1946PhRv...70..516W. doi:10.1103/PhysRev.70.516.
- —— (1947). "Proposed methods of detecting the neutrino". Physical Review. 71 (9): 645–646. Bibcode:1947PhRv...71..645W. doi:10.1103/PhysRev.71.645.
- —— (1947). "An organic activated ZnO-ZnCl_{2} phosphorescent substance". Science Record. 2: 54.
- Hsin, S. C.; —— (1947). "Phosphorescence produced by mechanical means". Chinese Journal of Physics. 7 (1): 53.
- ——; Jones, S. B. (1948). "On the disintegration of mesotrons". Physical Review. 74 (10): 1547–1548. Bibcode:1948PhRv...74.1547W. doi:10.1103/PhysRev.74.1547.2.

English (as G. Wang)

- Wang, N.; ——. "An 80-GW relativistic electron beam accelerator". Proceedings of the fifth International Conference on High-Power Particle Beams, USA, 1983.
- Wang, N.; ——. "100 Joule level KrF laser pumped by intense electron beam". Proceedings of the 2nd International Workshop on KrF Laser Technology, Alberta, Canada, 1990.

Chinese (as 王淦昌)

- ——．中性介子（π^{0}）的发现及它的性质．物理通报，1951,1(12):34.
- ——，郑仁圻，吕敏．在铅板里发生的电子光子簇射．物理学报，1955,11(5):421.
- ——，肖健，郑仁圻，吕敏．一个中性重介子的衰变．物理学报，1955,11(6):493.
- 郑仁圻，吕敏，肖健，——．在云室中观察到一个K介子的产生及其核俘获．物理学报，1956,12(4):376．
- ——，吕敏，郑仁圻．一个长寿命的带电超子．科学记录（新辑），1957,1(2):21.
- ——，王祝翔，维克斯勒，维辽索夫，乌兰拉，丁大钊等．8.3 GeV/c 的负π介子所产生的Σ^{−}超子．物理学报，1960,16(7):365； ЖэТФ，1960,38:1356．
- ——，王祝翔，维克斯列尔，符拉娜，丁大钊等．在动量为 6.8±6亿电子伏/c的π^{−}介子与质子相互作用下A^{0}（Σ0）及K^{0}的产生．物理学报，1961,17(2):61； ЖэТФ，1961,40:464.
- ——，王祝翔．能量在10GeV以下的π-N，p-N和p-N相互作用．物理学报，1961,17:520.
- 丁大钊，王祝翔，——．奇异粒子的强相互作用．物理学报，1962,18:334.
- ——．利用高功率激光驱动核聚变反应．（内部报告）1964.
- ——．国际上惯性约束核聚变情况简介和对我国在这方面工作的意见．（惯性约束核聚变讨论会文集）1982.9.
- ——，诸旭辉，王乃彦，谢京刚，李鹰山，周昌淮，王璞．6焦耳KrF激光的产生．核科学与工程，1985,5(1):1.
- ——，诸旭辉，王乃彦，谢京刚，李鹰山，周昌淮，王璞．12．5焦耳电子束泵浦KrF激光器．应用激光，1986,6(2):49.
- ——．王淦昌论文选集．北京：科学出版社，1987．
- 徐宜志，——．闪光－1强流脉冲电子束加速器．原子核物理，1987,9(2):69.

Russian (as Ван Ган-чан )

- ——; et al. (1960). "Исследование упругого pacceяния π^{−} мезонов с импульсом 6.8 GeV/c на протонах с помошью пропановой пузырьковой камеpы". ЖЭТФ. 38: 426.
- ——; et al. (1960). "Рождение антипротонов при взаимодействии π^{−} мезонов с нуклонами". ЖЭТФ. 38: 1010.
- Бирзер, H. г.; ——; Ван, Цу-чен; et al. (1961). "Неупругие взаимодействия π^{−} мезонов с импульсом 6.8 GeV/c с нуклонами". ЖЭТФ. 41 (5): 1461.
