= Chen Fangyun =

Chinese electrical engineer

Chen Fangyun (Chinese: 陈芳允; 3 April 1916 – 29 April 2000) was a Chinese electrical engineer. Considered the founder of radio electronics in China, he was pivotal in the development of telemetry, tracking and command (TT&C) systems that control China's satellites and missiles, and in the early development of the BeiDou satellite navigation system. He was an academician of the Chinese Academy of Sciences and the International Academy of Astronautics, and was awarded the Two Bombs, One Satellite Meritorious Medal in 1999. The asteroid 10929 Chenfangyun is named after him.

== Early life and education ==
Chen was born on 3 April 1916 in Huangyan, Taizhou, Zhejiang, Republic of China. He graduated from Huangyan County Middle School in 1931 and Shanghai Pudong High School in 1934.

He entered Tsinghua University in 1934 and graduated with a bachelor's degree in physics in 1938. While a student at Tsinghua, he participated in the December 9th Movement of 1935 against Japanese aggression in North China.

== Career ==
During the Second Sino-Japanese War, Chen taught and conducted research at Tsinghua University's Radio Research Institute and later worked at the Chengdu Radio Factory. After the end of the war, he went to Britain in 1945 and worked for three years as a researcher at the A.C. Cossor radio factory.

Chen returned to China in 1948. He was one of the scientists who established the Institute of Electronics of the Chinese Academy of Sciences. At the institute, he developed the world's first measuring device for ultrashort pulse, used to ascertain the level of radiation in nuclear explosions. In 1964, he developed China's first anti-jamming radar for aircraft.

In the early 1970s, Chen began researching and developing telemetry, tracking and command (TT&C) systems that control satellites tens of thousands of kilometers away from earth. The TT&C system he proposed was crucial in the successful launch of China's first geosynchronous communications satellite in April 1984, and he was conferred the Special Prize of the State Science and Technology Progress Award the next year. Based on Chen's pioneering work, a network of TT&C systems has since been deployed to control China's satellites and missiles. He also put forward theories and proposals leading to the creation and early development of BeiDou, the Chinese satellite navigation system built as an alternative to the American Global Positioning System, and is considered a founder of BeiDou.

In March 1986, Chen and three other prominent scientists—Wang Daheng, Wang Ganchang, and Yang Jiachi—wrote a letter to Deng Xiaoping advocating the development of strategic technologies. Deng accepted their proposal, which gave birth to the influential 863 Program, named after the date of their letter.

Chen died on 29 April 2000, at the age of 84.

== Honours and recognition ==
Chen was elected an academician of the Chinese Academy of Sciences in 1980. He was also an academician of the International Academy of Astronautics and served as Vice President of the International Astronautical Federation.

Chen was awarded the Two Bombs, One Satellite Meritorious Medal in 1999. The asteroid 10929 Chenfangyun, discovered by the Beijing Schmidt CCD Asteroid Program in 1998, is named after him.
