= CNBM =

CNBM may refer to:

- China National Building Material Company, a Chinese company engaged in building products and engineering service businesses
- Carbon Nutrient Balance Model, an ecological model
