= Yang Jiachi =

Chinese aerospace engineer

Yang Jiachi (Chinese: 杨嘉墀; 16 July 1919 – 11 June 2006) was a Chinese aerospace engineer and a specialist in satellite control and automation. A participant in the development of China's first satellites and the developer of the attitude control system for recoverable satellites, he was awarded the Two Bombs, One Satellite Meritorious Medal in 1999. He was an academician of the Chinese Academy of Sciences and the International Academy of Astronautics. The asteroid 11637 Yangjiachi is named after him.

== Early life and education ==
Yang was born on 16 July 1919 in the town of Zhenze in Wujiang, Jiangsu, Republic of China.

Yang received a Bachelor of Science in electrical engineering from Chiao Tung University in Shanghai in 1941. He received a Master of Science in 1947 and a Doctor of Philosophy in 1949 from Harvard University.

== Career ==
After earning his Ph.D., Yang worked in the US for seven years, first as a research scientist at the University of Pennsylvania and later as a senior engineer at the Rockefeller University.

In 1956, Yang returned to China and worked as a research scientist at the Institute of Automation under the Chinese Academy of Sciences. In 1968, he was transferred to the China Academy of Space Technology to participate in the development of China's first satellites. His most important contribution was developing three-axis stabilization for the attitude control systems of recoverable satellites, and he also developed control systems for rockets and nuclear weapons testing. He was elected a delegate to the Third, Fourth, and Fifth National People's Congresses.

In March 1986, Yang and three other prominent scientists—Wang Daheng, Wang Ganchang, and Chen Fangyun—wrote a letter to Deng Xiaoping advocating the development of strategic technologies. Deng accepted their proposal, which gave birth to the influential 863 Program, named after the date of their letter.

Yang died in Beijing on 11 June 2006 at the age of 86. He was buried at the Babaoshan Revolutionary Cemetery.

== Honours and recognition ==
Yang was elected an academician of the Chinese Academy of Sciences in 1980, and of the International Academy of Astronautics in 1985. He was conferred the Special Prize of the State Science and Technology Progress Award (1985), the Tan Kah Kee Prize in Information Science (1995), the Ho Leung Ho Lee Prize for Technological Sciences (1999), and the Two Bombs, One Satellite Meritorious Medal (1999).

The asteroid 11637 Yangjiachi, discovered by the Beijing Schmidt CCD Asteroid Program in 1996, is named after him.
