= International Journal of Software and Informatics =

- Discipline: Computer science
- Language: English
- Edited by: Ruqian Lu

Publication details
- History: 2007-present
- Publisher: Chinese Academy of Sciences (China)

Standard abbreviations
- ISO 4: Int. J. Softw. Inform.

Indexing
- ISSN: 1673-7288

Links
- Journal homepage

The International Journal of Software and Informatics is a quarterly peer-reviewed scientific journal of computer science. It was started by the Institute of Software of the Chinese Academy of Sciences. It covers the following topics: Artificial intelligence and pattern recognition, computer software, computer-aided applications, formal methods, multimedia techniques, theoretical computer science, network and information security, and related areas including quantum informatics, bioinformatics, neuroinformatics, and cognitive science.

The journal's editor in chief is Ruqian Lu (Institute of Mathematics, Academy of Mathematics and Systems Science, Chinese Academy of Sciences, China). The journal's associate editor is Xiapu Luo.

== See also ==
- Scientific publishing in China
