= Wang Daheng =

Chinese optical physicist

Wang Daheng (Chinese: 王大珩; 26 February 1915 – 21 July 2011) was a Chinese optical physicist, engineer, and inventor widely considered the "father of optical engineering" in China. He was a founding academician of both the Chinese Academy of Sciences and the Chinese Academy of Engineering. He was the founder of the Changchun Institute of Optics and Fine Mechanics, Changchun University of Science and Technology, and the Chinese Optical Society.

== Early life and education ==
Wang was born on 26 February 1915 in Tokyo, Japan, with his ancestral home in Suzhou, China. His father Wang Yingwei (王应伟) was an astronomer then studying in Japan.

Wang graduated from the Department of Physics at Tsinghua University in 1936. In 1938, he won the Boxer Indemnity Scholarship to study in England. After earning his master's degree from Imperial College London in 1940, he began his doctoral studies at the University of Sheffield in optical physics and technology.

== Career ==
=== United Kingdom ===
After World War II broke out in 1939, Nazi Germany, a major maker of optical glass, banned the export of the strategic product. The British government offered support for domestic companies to develop and manufacture the product, and Wang decided to abandon his studies and join Chance Brothers, a leading British glass manufacturer. His research at the company led to the development of new types of optical glass and precision instruments.

=== China ===
In 1948, Wang returned to China and established the Department of Applied Physics at the former Dalian University (now part of the Dalian University of Technology).

In 1952, Wang established the Changchun Institute of Optics and Fine Mechanics (originally named the Institute of Instrumentation) of the Chinese Academy of Sciences in Changchun. He is also considered the founder of Changchun University of Science and Technology, a spinoff of the institute. He worked at the institute from 1952 to 1983, and served several times as its president. At the institute, he made a number of inventions and developed China's first electronic microscope and laser. Under his leadership, the Changchun Institute played a crucial role in the development of strategic weapons, developing high-precision optics for missile guidance systems. It enabled major breakthroughs for China's submarine-launched ballistic missile program.

Wang was elected a founding member of the Chinese Academy of Sciences (CAS) in 1955. In 1992, he and five other scientists advocated the creation of the Chinese Academy of Engineering (CAE) independent from the CAS. When the Chinese government accepted their proposal and established the CAE in 1994, Wang was again elected as a founding academician and a member of the presidium. He was a fellow of SPIE and chaired a number of SPIE symposiums and conferences.

In March 1986, Wang Daheng and three other prominent scientists—Wang Ganchang, Yang Jiachi, and Chen Fangyun—wrote a letter to Deng Xiaoping advocating the development of strategic technologies. Deng accepted their proposal, which gave birth to the influential 863 Program, named after the date of their letter.

Wang died on 21 July 2011 in Beijing, at the age of 96. He was buried at the Babaoshan Revolutionary Cemetery.

== Honours and recognition ==
Wang was awarded the Two Bombs, One Satellite Meritorious Medal in 1999 for his role in developing the technology to trigger nuclear fusion using laser. He was also conferred the Special Prize of the State Science and Technology Progress Award and the Ho Leung Ho Lee Prize for Achievement in Science and Technology.

The asteroid 17693 Wangdaheng, discovered by the Beijing Schmidt CCD Asteroid Program in 1997, is named after him.
