= China National Materials Group =

Chinese state-owned enterprise

China National Materials Group Corporation 中国材料工业科工集团公司
- Type: State-owned enterprise
- Industry: Cement equipment and engineering
- Founded: 1983
- Headquarters: Beijing, People's Republic of China
- Area served: People's Republic of China
- Key people: Chairman: Mr. Tan Zhongming
- Revenue: 28.75 billion Yuan (2008)
- Net income: 2 billion Yuan (2008)
- Number of employees: 48,084
- Website: Sinoma Official Website

China National Materials Group or Sinoma, established in 1983, is a central government-administered enterprise directly under the administration of the State-owned Assets Supervision and Administration Commission of the State Council of the People's Republic of China. It is the world's largest cement equipment and engineering service provider and China's leading non-metal materials manufacturer. It is also the only enterprise that possesses a series of core technologies and complete innovation system in non-metal materials industry in China.

The group's subsidiaries listed as A shares in the Shanghai Stock Exchange and the Shenzhen Stock Exchange are Sinoma International Engineering (SSE: 600970), Ningxia Saima Industry (SSE: 600449) and Xinjiang Guotong Pipeline (SZSE: 002205).

Another of the group's subsidiaries, China National Materials (SEHK: 1893), was listed as H shares in the Hong Kong Stock Exchange on 20 December 2007 while the IPO price was HK$4.5 per share. It attracted six investors including China Construction Bank, China Life Insurance, China Communications Construction, Citigroup, Government of Singapore Investment Corporation (GIC) and Leslie Lee Alexander, owner of the Houston Rockets basketball team. Xinjiang Tianshan Cement (SZSE: 000877), a company listed in Shenzhen, was China National Materials's subsidiary.

== Business areas ==
China National Materials Company Limited and its subsidiaries, provides cement equipment and engineering services, as well as manufactures cement, glass fiber, and non-metal materials.

It operates in four segments: Cement Equipment and Engineering Services, Glass Fiber, Cement, and High-Tech Materials.

The Cement Equipment and Engineering Services segment provides engineering and construction services for mines, roads, bridges, and tunnels projects; builds equipment used in new dry process cement production lines; engages in equipment purchasing; offers project research, development, and design services; and provides turnkey services.

The Glass Fiber segment engages in the production and sale of glass fiber and glass fiber products, such as roving, glass fiber mats, electronic yarn, chopped strands, and woven roving.

The Cement segment produces and sells cements, clinkers, and standard sand.

The High-Tech Materials segment involves in the production and sale of glass microfiber paper, high strength glass fiber, high temperature filtration materials, and composite materials; and the provision of design, equipment, and technology services for glass fiber production and non metal mineral fine processing. This segment also provides microcrystalline alumina ceramics and fine fused quartz ceramics; high pressure electric porcelain and used silica ceramic crucible; and KTP, infrared crystals, and microcrystalline glass. The company sells its products in the People's Republic of China, the Middle East, Europe, Africa, and other Asian countries.

== See also ==
- Advanced materials industry in China
