= CAS Star =

Chinese venture capital firm

- Native name: 中科创星
- Company type: State-owned enterprise
- Industry: Venture capital
- Founded: 2013; 13 years ago
- Founders: Mi Lei; Li Hao; Cao Huitao
- Headquarters: Xi'an, Shaanxi, China
- AUM: US$1.4 billion (2023)
- Owner: Chinese Academy of Sciences
- Website: www.casstar.com.cn

CAS Star (Chinese: 中科创星; pinyin: Zhōngkē Chuàngxīng) is a Chinese venture capital firm that focuses on investments in hard tech startups. It is backed by the Chinese Academy of Sciences.

== Background ==
CAS Star was founded in 2013 by Mi Lei, Cao Huitao and Li Hao. Mi and Cao were researchers at the Xi'an Institute of Optics and Precision Mechanics of the Chinese Academy of Science while Li was a veteran investor.

Initially the firm had difficulties raising capital. Every industry the firm invested in was when it was in its decline and therefore was not popular. Investments were expected to take a long time before there were payoffs. As a result, many investors at the time did not believe in investing in hard tech that could not generate quick returns. In addition it was difficult to know which projects were good as there were many unreliable ones and due to the long investment cycle, it was difficult to determine their value until many years later.

CAS Star started out investing in the photonics sector and gradually expanded its investment scope to include other sectors such as semiconductors, aerospace, artificial intelligence, quantum computing and alternative energy. When the Shanghai Stock Exchange STAR Market was established, hard tech investments attracted more attention and became more popular.

Apart from investing in companies themselves, CAS Star also invested in providing equipment, manpower and guidance to startups. Many startups came from scientists who were involved in research and development with little experience in managing a business or sufficient capital to acquire advance hardware. CAS Star noticed that without proper guidance, many startups would fail in the early stages.

CAS Star receives funding from both private and public entities which include China Government Guidance Funds.
