= China National Building Material =

Chinese building materials company

- Company type: public
- Traded as: SEHK: 3323
- Industry: Building materials
- Founded: 1984
- Headquarters: Beijing, People's Republic of China
- Area served: People's Republic of China
- Key people: Chairman: Mr. Song Zhi Ping
- Products: Cement, Gypsum, Fiber glass
- Number of employees: 100,000 people
- Parent: China National Building Material Group
- Website: www.cnbm.com.cn/

China National Building Material Co., Ltd.
- Simplified Chinese: 中国建材股份
Transcriptions

Alternative Chinese name
- Simplified Chinese: 中国建材
Transcriptions

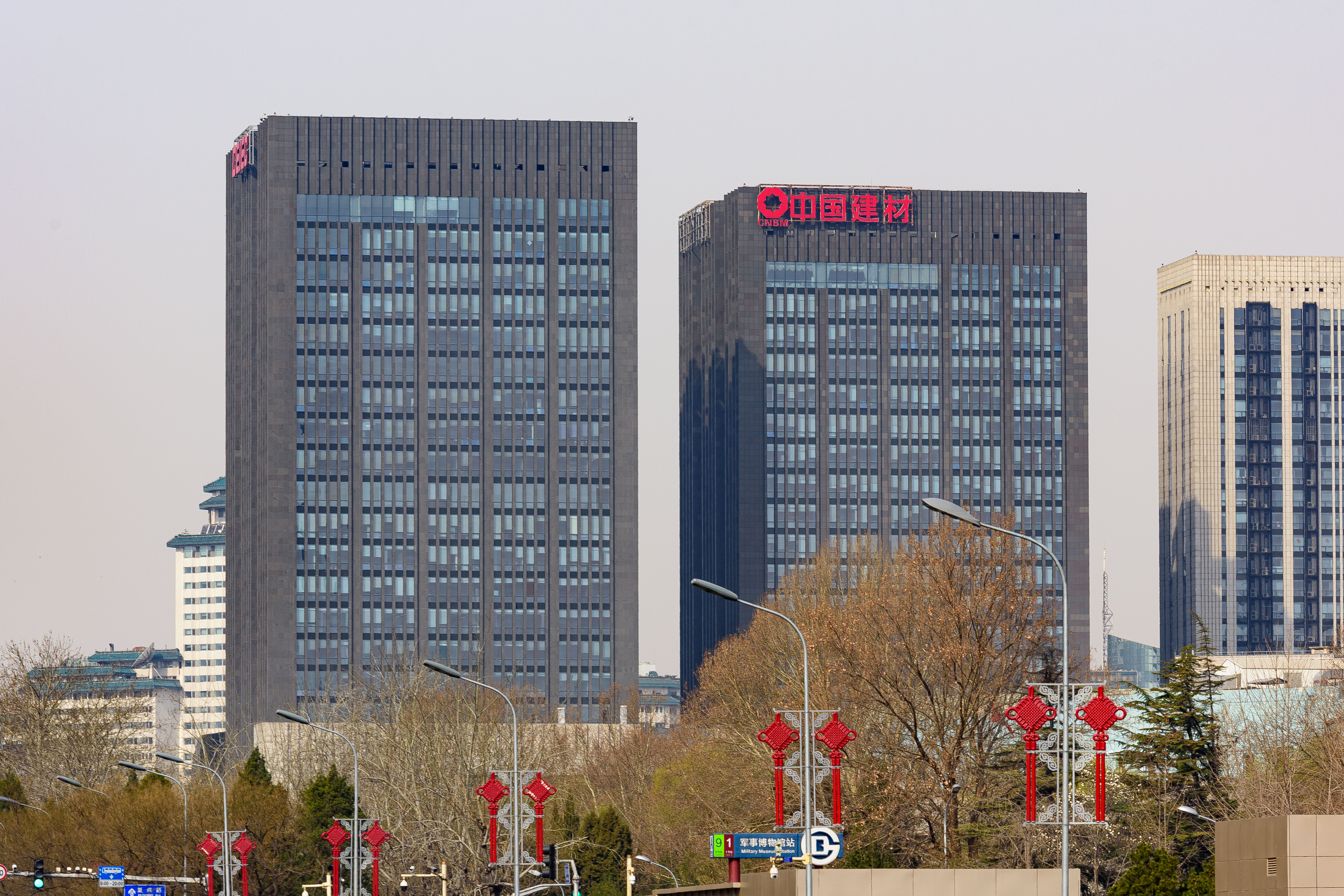
Power Plaza, which houses CNBM Headquarters

China National Building Material Co., Ltd. or CNBM is a public traded company, engaging in cement, lightweight building materials, glass fiber and fibre-reinforced plastic products and engineering service businesses.

CNBM is currently the largest cement and gypsum board producer in China. It is also the largest glass fiber producer in Asia.

CNBM was listed on the Hong Kong Stock Exchange under IPO on 23 March 2006.

CNBM joined the Hang Seng China Enterprises Index from 10 March 2008.

In October 2013 CNBM entered into an agreement with Qatari Investors Group to expand the Al Khaliji Cement plant. Al Khaliji, a subsidiary of Qatari Investors Group, is planning to double clinker and production capacity at the plant to 12,000tpd and 14,000tpd, respectively. FLSmidth is to supply equipment and machinery for the US$190m expansion.

In 2013, CNBM acquires China manufacturer of solar photovoltaics modules, Jetion Solar.

In 2014, CNBM acquires German thin-film solar cell manufacturer, Avancis.

In the middle of 2014, CNBM took over all of the risks and benefits for 10 Ukrainian solar power plants, namely, Voskhod Solar, Neptun Solar, Franko Solar, Franko PV, Dunayskaya SES-1, Dunayskaya SES-2, Priozernaya-1, Priozernaya-2, Limanskaya Energy-1 and Limanskaya Energy-2.

In 2015, CNBM begun work on a new 1.5 GW CIGS fab in Bengbu, Anhui province, China, in what promises to become one of the largest CIGS manufacturing facilities in the country.

In 2016, UK solar developers WElink Energy and British Solar Renewables (BSR) have signed a £1.1 billion deal with CNBM to develop solar energy projects and zero-carbon homes in the UK.

The parent company of China National Building Material is China National Building Material Group (established in 1984), is a state-owned enterprise administered by the State-owned Assets Supervision and Administration Commission of the State Council.

== See also ==
- Advanced materials industry in China
- Chinese drywall
