= Nature China =

Online magazine

- Categories: Science, Interdisciplinary
- Frequency: Weekly
- Publisher: Nature Publishing Group
- First issue: January 2007
- Final issue: present
- Country: United Kingdom
- Website: www.nature.com/nchina/index.html
- ISSN: 1751-5793

Nature China (simplified Chinese: 自然中国; traditional Chinese: 自然中國; pinyin: Zìrán Zhōngguó) is an online publication by Nature Publishing Group (NPG) that highlights the best research being produced in Hong Kong and mainland China in science and medicine. The international website was launched in January 2007, while the Chinese website was launched on 25 April 2007. The site and its content are free to view for registered users.

== Background ==
China's scientific research is growing faster than that of any other country. China has the world's second highest number of researchers, at 923,000, behind the United States. By the end of 2006, China also became the world's second-highest investor in research and development (R&D), again behind the United States, with a forecast expenditure of over US$136 billion (at purchasing power parity).

According to the Institute for Scientific Information (ISI), the output of research papers from China has soared from 10,000 papers per year in 1990 to over 80,000 papers per year in 2006. To put this in context, it is now at the same level as the United Kingdom and Japan. More importantly, the number of very high-impact papers (top 1 percentile of ISI citations) has increased from 21 in 1994 to 223 in 2003 – a tenfold increase.

== Aims and scope ==
The aim of Nature China is to give scientists and professionals worldwide an insight into the latest research from Hong Kong and mainland China.

Each week, the editors of Nature China survey all scientific journals (both English and Chinese journals) to identify the best, recently published papers from Hong Kong and mainland China. Unlike most NPG journals, Nature China only publishes Research Highlights (short 200-word summaries) that explain the importance of the latest scientific findings in Hong Kong and mainland China.

The website also features a "Recommended Paper" section where users can recommend any Chinese research paper of interest, whether it is novel or controversial, provided it is not their own. Users can also vote or comment on those suggestions already in the database.

The publication covers topics including:

- Biotechnology
- Cell and molecular biology
- Chemistry
- Clinical medicine
- Developmental biology
- Earth and environment
- Ecology and evolution
- Genetics
- Materials
- Neuroscience
- Physics
- Space and astronomy

== See also ==
- Academic publishing in China
- Nature
- Nature Chemical Biology
- Nature Nanotechnology
- Nature Materials
- Nature Photonics
- Nature Physics
