= Yun Ziqiang =

Chinese chemist (1899–1963)

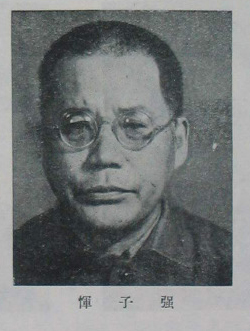

Yun Ziqiang (Chinese: 恽子强; April 28, 1899 – February 22, 1963) was a Chinese chemist, who was a member of the Chinese Academy of Sciences.
