= Wang Pu (physicist) =

Chinese nuclear physicist (1902–1969)

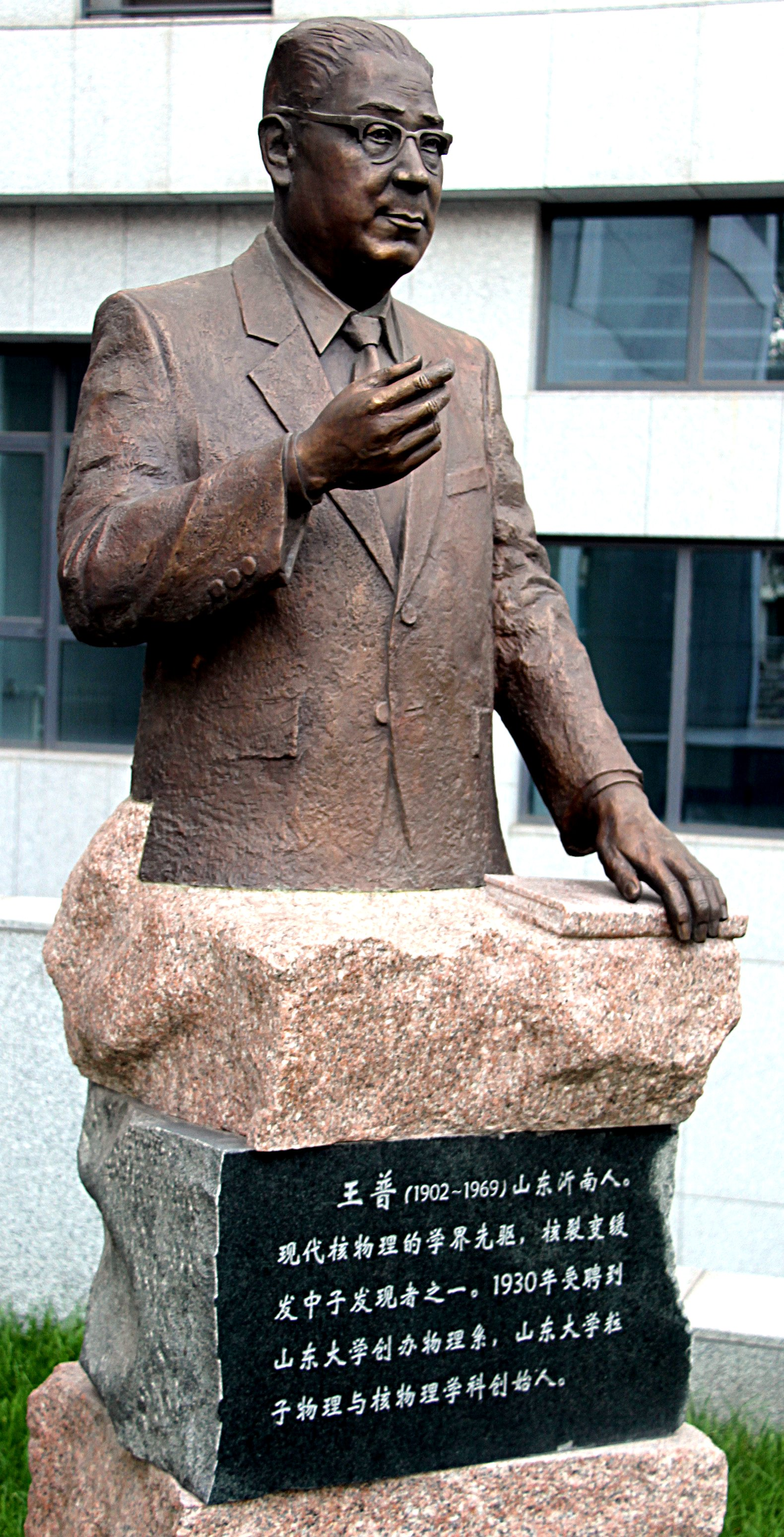
Statue of Wang Pu on the Central Campus of Shandong University.

Wang Pu (Chinese: 王普, English/German name Paul Wang, September 9, 1902 – January 15, 1969) was a Chinese nuclear physicist. He was one of two Chinese PhD students working with Lise Meitner at the Kaiser Wilhelm Institute for Chemistry. He founded the School of Physics at Shandong University.

Wang Pu was born in Yishui County to the west of Qingdao then a part of the German Kiautschou Bay concession. He was the son of a Chinese highschool teacher. He studied first in Beijing and worked from September 1935 to July 1938 in Lise Meitner's group at the Kaiser Wilhelm Institute for Chemistry.

== See also ==
- Wang Ganchang (first Chinese PhD student of Lise Meitner)
