= Advanced materials industry in China =

As an important part of the national sustainable development strategy, the development of advanced materials is advancing the competitive nature and state of the art for Chinese industry. The State has put advanced materials high on its development agenda for the next decade and listed it among the key high-tech industry sectors that would be given priority for development by the State Council. At present, the pace of building China's advanced materials industry is accelerating. Advanced materials have been key fields in China's national R&D system (National High Technology Research and Development Program (863 Program) and National Basic Research Program (973 Program)).

== R&D leaders ==
- Shanghai Institute of Ceramics, Chinese Academy of Sciences
- State Key Laboratory of High Performance Ceramics and Superfine Microstructures
- National Engineering Research Center for Biomaterials
- National Industrial Ceramics Engineering Technology Center
- The State Key Lab of New Ceramics and Fine Processing

== Domestic leaders ==
- Dongxin Seals Co., Ltd
- Zibo HuaChuang Fine Ceramics Co., Ltd
- Shenzhen Upcera Co., Ltd
- Yixing Nonmetallic Chemical Machinery Factory
- Sinoma Advanced Materials Co., Ltd.
- Beijing Tsinghua Unisplendor Founder High-Tech Ceramics Co. Ltd
- Beijing Trend Aofu Fine Ceramics Co., Ltd.
- Elite Ceramic (Beijing) Co., Ltd
- Shenyang Starlight Advanced Ceramics Co., Ltd
- Fenghua Feigu Kaiheng Seal Technologies Co., Ltd.
- Luoyang Bearing Science and Technology Co., Ltd.
- Yixing Haldenwanger Fine Ceramic Co., Ltd.
- Shandong Far East High-technological Material Co., Ltd.
- Zibo GT Industrial Ceramics Co., Ltd.
- Wuxi Murata Electronics Co., Ltd.
- Guangdong Jin Gang New Materials Co., Ltd.
- Dalian Dayou Advanced Ceramic Co., Ltd.
- Fenghua Advanced Technology (Holding) Co., Ltd
- Zhejiang Jiakang Electronics Co., Ltd
- Jiangsu Jiangjia Electronics Co., Ltd.
- Jiangsu Baotong Electronic & Technology Co., Ltd
- Chengdu Hongming Electronics Co., Ltd.
- Zhejiang Zhengyuan Electric Co., Ltd.
- Chaozhou Three-Circle
- Leatec Fine Ceramics (Kunshan) Co., Ltd.
- Shanghai Bio-lu Biomaterials Co., Ltd
- National Engineering Research Center for Biomaterials
- Hunan Gongchuang Bio-functional Materials Co., Ltd.
- Wuhan Huawei Bio Materials Engineering Development Co., Ltd.

== International leaders ==
- Saint-Gobain Zirpro (Handan) Co., Ltd
- Shanghai Nicera Sensor Co., Ltd
- Shanghai KYOCERA Electronics Co., Ltd.
- Weifang Huamei Fine Ceramics Co., Ltd
- Germany FCT (Tangshan) Technical Ceramics Co., Ltd
- Corning Shanghai Co., Ltd

== See also ==
- Advanced Materials journal
- Materials science
