= Changchun University of Science and Technology =

University in Jinlin, China

Coordinates: 43.8280°N 125.3080°E

- 长春理工大学
- Other names: 长理
- Motto: 明德,博学,求是,创新
- Motto in English: Virtuous, Learned, Truthful, Innovative
- Type: Public
- Established: 1958
- Academic affiliations: Commission for Science, Technology and Industry for National Defense and Jilin Provincial Education Department
- President: Hao Qun
- Party Secretary: Zhang Baozong
- Academic staff: 2,030
- Administrative staff: 1,580
- Students: 20,790
- Undergraduates: 15,884
- Postgraduates: 4,279
- Doctoral students: 396
- Location: Changchun, Jilin, China
- Website: www.cust.edu.cn

Changchun University of Science and Technology is a public university in Changchun, Jilin, China, previously known as Changchun Institute of Optics and Fine Mechanics (Chinese: 长春光学精密机械学院). It was founded by Wang Daheng in 1958.

== Schools and colleges ==
- School of Science
- School of Photoelectric Engineering
- School of Mechatronical Engineering
- School of Electronics and Information Engineering
- School of Computer Science and Technology
- School of Material Science and Engineering
- School of Chemistry and Environmental Engineering
- School of Life Science and Technology
- school of Biological and Medical Engineering
- School of Economics and Management
- School of Foreign Languages
- School of Chinese Literature
- School of Law
- School of Software
- School of Artificial intelligence

== Libraries ==
CUST Library was initially founded in 1958, simultaneously with the university itself. With unanimous growth with CUST, the infrastructure of the libraries as well as other aspects of dedication have maintained steady development. Since nearly half a century's construction, two large and modern libraries with its unique features of collection are now erupting at both the east campus and west campus of CUST. Following CUST's overall layout and programming, the library in the east campus nominates a collection of books in the fields of sciences while the library in the west campus mainly collects books involving the fields of humanities.

The libraries have now a collection of 1,772,000 copies of books in Chinese and foreign languages. The floor area of the libraries is 32,621 square meters.

== Courses ==
=== Undergraduate programs ===
- Information and Computing Science
- Applied Physics
- Electronic Science and Technology
- Optical Information Science and Technology
- Optical-electronics Technology
- Micro-electronics
- Measuring and Controlling Technology and Equipment
- Optical and Electronic Information Engineering
- Mechanical Design Manufacture and Automation
- Mechanical and Electronic Engineering
- Processing Equipment and Control
- Electrical Engineering and Automation
- Electronic Information Engineering
- Telecommunication Engineering
- Automation
- Electronic Information Science and Technology
- Computer Science and Technology
- Software Engineering
- Network Engineering
- Inorganic Non-metallic Materials Engineering
- Material Chemistry
- Environmental Science
- Chemical Engineering and Technology
- Biological technology
- Biological Engineering
- Biological and Medical Engineering
- Economics
- Financial Engineering
- Marketing
- Information Management and Information System
- International economy and Business Economics
- Business Administration
- Accounting
- Labor and Social Insurance
- English Language
- Japanese Language
- Russian Language
- Korean Language
- Chinese Language and Literature
- Advertisement
- Chinese as a Foreign Language
- Art design
- Industrial Design
- Law

=== Postgraduate programs ===
- Theoretical Physics
- Particle Physics and Nuclear Physics
- Atom and Molecule physics
- Plasma Physics
- Radio Physics
- Condensed Matter Physics
- Acoustics
- Optics
- Physical electronics
- Micro-electronics and Solid State Electronics
- Optical engineering
- Precise instruments and Machinery
- Testing and Metrological Technology and Instruments
- Programs of Master Degree
- Mechanical manufacture and Automation
- Mechanical and Electronic Engineering
- Mechanical design and Theory
- Electromagnetic field and Microwave technology
- Electric Circuit and System
- Telecommunication and Information System
- Signal and Information Processing
- Test Technology and Automation Device
- Mode identification and Intelligent System
- Computer Software and Theory
- Computer system structure
- Computer applied technology
- Material physics and Chemistry
- Material Science
- Material processing engineering
- Inorganic Chemistry
- Physical Chemistry
- Applied Chemistry
- Biological and Medical Engineering
- Management Science and Engineering
- Industrial Economics
- Enterprise management
- Foreign Languages and Applied Linguistics
- Chinese Philology
- Constitution and Administration Law
- MBA- Master in Business Administration

=== Ph.D. programs ===
- Optics
- Physical Electronics
- Optical engineering
- Equipment science and Technology
- Precise Instruments and Machinery
- Measuring and Controlling Technology and Equipment
- Machinery manufacture and Automation
- Mechanical Engineering
- Mechanical and Electronic Engineering
- Mechanical design and Theory
- Telecommunication and Information System
- Material physics and Chemistry

== Optical-Electric Engineering School ==
The optical electric engineering school, established in 1958, originated from the optical electric engineering department. There are five departments: optical engineering department, instrumental science and technology department, detection and information engineering department, photo electronics institution and the institute of space technology. There is one national key major, two Doctoral (optical engineering and instrumental science and technology), three master's programs (optical engineering, measuring and testing technology, and fine instruments), and four bachelor programs (controlling technology and instruments, optical-electric information engineering, information confrontation, detection guidance and controlling technology).

== Notable people ==
Name	Position
Wang Daheng	Founder of the Changchun University of Science and Technology (Former CIOMP), "the father of optical engineering" in China
Zhang Guoqing	Major of Tianjin
Gao Guangbin	Deputy Communist Party Secretary of Jilin province
Gong Zutong	Academician of Chinese Academy of Science
Zhang Zuomei	Academician of Chinese Academy of Science
Deng Ximing	Academician of Chinese Academy of Science
Wang Zhijiang	Academician of Chinese Academy of Science
Liu Songhao	Academician of Chinese Academy of Science
Wang Fuxi	Academician of Chinese Academy of Science
Chunlei Guo	Professor at University of Rochester, finder of Black Metal
Xuan Ming	Director of Changchun Institute of Optics, Fine Mechanics and Physics, Chinese Academy of Science
Zhu Jianqiang	Director of Shanghai Institute of Optics, Fine Mechanics and Physics, Chinese Academy of Science
Shi Zhengrong	Founder, former Chairman & CEO Suntech Power
Wang Songling	Vice President of China National Machinery Industry Corporation

== Affiliations ==
- Commission for Science, Technology and Industry for National Defense
- Jilin Provincial Education Department
