= Program 973 =

Chinese research program

973 Program (Chinese: 973计划) or also known as National Basic Research Program is a basic research program initiated by the People's Republic of China to achieve technology and strategic edge in various scientific fields and especially the development of the rare earth minerals industry. The program was absorbed alongside the 863 Program into the "National Key R&D Program" in 2016.

== History ==
The program was initiated in 1997 by the Chinese government as part of the revitalize the country through science and education policy to develop basic research, innovations and technologies aligned with national priorities in economic development and social development. The program was managed by the Chinese Ministry of Science and Technology. Natural Science Foundation of China is also involved in coordinating the research with the program.

Over the years the program has dedicated funding to areas such as agriculture, health, information, energy, environment, resources, population and materials.

== Project funding ==
The central government has in the past funded projects for a term of no more than five years. Recently, the funding model has changed to 2 + 3 years. Two years after the project has been implemented, it will be assessed by a special panel and allocate funding accordingly.

== See also ==
- Advanced materials industry in China
- Program 863
- Project 985
- Project 211
- Science and technology in China
