= Science Record =

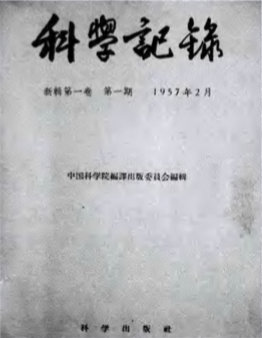
- Cover of new edition of Science Record
- Founder(s): Wu Youxun
- Publisher: Academia Sinica (1942-1949); Science Press (1950-1952); Chinese Academy of Sciences (1957-1960)
- Founded: January 1942
- Ceased publication: 1960
- Headquarters: Beijing
- ISSN: 0559-1244

Science Record
- Traditional Chinese: 科學記錄
- Simplified Chinese: 科学记录
Transcriptions
Standard Mandarin
- Hanyu Pinyin: Kēxué jìlù

The Science Record (simplified Chinese: 科学记录; traditional Chinese: 科學記錄; pinyin: Kēxué jìlù), or Scientific Records, Science Report, was a scientific journal launched in January 1942 by the Academia Sinica of the Republic of China in Chengdu, Sichuan. As an international academic exchange journal, it published original results of China's basic research in English, German and French.

== History ==
While at National Southwestern Associated University, Wu Youxun served as the editor-in-chief of Science Record, which was dedicated to the scientific achievements of Chinese academics under extremely difficult conditions during the Second Sino-Japanese War, and was the only medium of communication between China and the international academic community at that time.

After the establishment of the People's Republic of China, Science Record continued to be published by the Chinese Academy of Sciences. On 31 October 1952, it was merged into the foreign language edition of Acta Scientia Sinica and resumed publication.

In 1960, Science Record finally discontinued publication.
