= 863 Program =

Chinese technology program

The 863 program (Chinese: 863计划) or State High-Tech Development Plan (Chinese: 国家高技术研究发展计划) was a program funded and administered by the government of the People's Republic of China intended to stimulate the development of advanced technologies in a wide range of fields for the purpose of rendering China independent of financial obligations for foreign technologies. It was inspired by the Strategic Defense Initiative proposed by U.S. president Ronald Reagan in 1983, and was absorbed alongside Program 973 into the "National Key R&D Program" in 2016.

On March 3, 1986, the program was suggested by Wang Daheng, Wang Ganchang, Yang Jiachi, and Chen Fangyun in a letter to China's paramount leader Deng Xiaoping, who approved the program within 2 days. The program was initially led by Zhao Ziyang, who was the premier of China at the time, and received a governmental fund of 10 billion RMB in 1986, which accounts for 5% of the total government spending that year. According to the US National Counterintelligence and Security Center, the 863 program "provides funding and guidance for efforts to clandestinely acquire US technology and sensitive economic information."

Among the products known to have resulted from the 863 program are the Loongson computer processor family (originally named Godson), the Tianhe supercomputers and the Shenzhou spacecraft.

== History ==
Named after its date of establishment (March 1986, 86/3 by the Chinese date format), the 863 Program was proposed in a letter to the Chinese government by scientists Wang Daheng, Wang Ganchang, Yang Jiachi, and Chen Fangyun and endorsed by Deng Xiaoping. After its implementation during the Seventh Five-Year Plan, the program continued to operate through the two five-year plans that followed, with state financing of around 11 billion RMB and an output of around 2000 patents (national and international).

In 2001, under the Tenth Five-Year Plan, the program was reevaluated in consultation with foreign experts. The result was a widened focus to strengthen the competitiveness of China in the global economy. The evaluation practice has been included into the program as a project management system.

In a 2011 court case, Chinese-born scientist Huang Kexue was found guilty of stealing commercial secrets from US-based corporations and passing at least some of this information to the 863 program.

== Outline ==
The program initially focused on seven key technological fields:

- Biotechnology
- Space
- Information technology
- Laser technology
- Automation
- Energy
- New materials

Since 1986, two more fields have been brought under the umbrella of the program:

- Telecommunications (1992)
- Marine technology (1996)

It included substantial support for the advancement of optics and optoelectronics.

== See also ==
- Science and technology in China
- Allegations of intellectual property infringement by China
- Program 973
- State Key Laboratories
- Project 985
- Project 211
