= Academic publishing in China =

Today in China, there are more than 8,000 academic journals, of which more than 4,600 can be considered scientific. About 1,400 cover health science (medicine and public health). In 2022, it was reported that China has become one of the top countries in the world in both scientific research output, and also for highly cited academic papers.

== Journals ==
Almost all of the scientific journals in China are supported by central, regional, or local governments. Some scientific journals are owned by professional associations. There are very few privately owned scientific journals. Some journals—mainly those supported by the national government—are regarded as high-prestige journals, and authors preferentially select these journals for their best papers. Such top-tier journals include the 67 journals published by the Chinese Medical Association. Those journals and most other academic journals are indexed by major indexing services in China.

Most scientific journals in China are published monthly, bimonthly, or quarterly. A few are published twice a month. The average time to publication is 14.1 months. Most journals are available only in print form or only in electronic form. Most scientific journals in China are published in Chinese; a few have English translations of abstracts for research articles. Some 189 scientific journals are published in English, of which 29 are health-science journals.

Most articles published in English-language scientific journals in China are indexed by Science Citation Index and Engineering Index.

Most scientific journals in China are not published in English, which has meant that much of current scientific development in China is not readily available to non–Chinese-speaking scientists. A large portion of these journals however, also have an abstract in English. In 1999, only 661 Chinese journals were indexed in the international index systems:

- Science Citation Index: 13
- Engineering Index: 96
- Index of Science and Technology Programs: 110
- Science Abstracts: 117
- Center for Biophotonics: Science and Technology: 132
- Abstract Journal: 193

As of June 2001, 62 Chinese journals (44 in English) were indexed in the Science Citation Index Expanded.

The evaluation criteria for Chinese scientific journals are impact factor, cited number of journal, reaction index, mean citing rate, and non-self-cited rate.

The impact factor of Chinese scientific journals is relatively low. In 1999, the top-cited journal—Mining and Geologica Sinica—had an impact factor of 1.487, and the average number of citations per article published in the Chinese journals covered by Science Citation Index was 0.326. One reason for the low impact factor is that Chinese scientists tend to use relatively few references in their publications (average, 6.6 references per article). A second reason is that scientists in China, like those in other countries, prefer to publish their best papers in major or top English-language journals. In fact, for such purposes as promotion to senior positions, Chinese scientists must have published in Western journals. According to the Institute of Science and Technology of China, the number of articles written by Chinese scientists and published in non-Chinese journals increased from 13,134 in 1995 to 24,476 in 1999—a 95% increase.

As of 2022, it was reported in a study published by Japan's National Institute of Science and Technology Policy (NISTEP), that China had become one of the top countries in regard of producing both high quality and high quantity of scientific papers, and accounted for 27.2% of the world's top 1% of most-cited papers in 2019, taking the global lead and surpassing the US who had come second, with 24.9% of the top 1% of most-cited papers. The Economist also concluded that in 2022 China passed both the US and the European Union in the number of high-impact research papers published.

== Initiatives ==
Chinese colleges and universities have few scientific-writing courses, so improvement in scientific writing is slow. Most first-time authors writing in Chinese for publication in China usually follow the format used in the journal to which they are submitting their manuscripts.

To improve scientific publishing in China, the government has instituted initiatives to improve scientific writing. A format for scientific and technical reports, degree theses, and scientific papers has been developed (GB7713-87). The recommendations closely follow international standards, including using the structured abstract for biomedical research articles. By supporting standards set by the government and international bodies, it is hoped that health science journals improve their scientific communication.

A few books about biomedical writing have now been published in China. Also, a program, based in China, to teach biomedical writing and editing has been established with grants from the China Medical Board of New York. The purpose of this program, which began in 1996, is to increase publication of Chinese and other Asian research in English-language biomedical journals both by providing instruction in biomedical writing and by developing editors at the researchers' institutions.

Typically the writing courses have focused on the introduction and discussion sections of articles prepared for health-science journals in China. The introduction section of the paper has tended to be incomplete, so editors and readers do not understand the point of the paper. Editors envisage the introduction as being rather like a funnel, beginning with what is known about the particular problem, leading to what is unknown and important to find out, and ending with the objectives of the research. Chinese authors typically begin the discussion with a reiteration of well-known knowledge, with little attempt to indicate how their research adds to the body of knowledge. The discussion section rarely discusses the limitations of the research.

Typical Chinese manuscripts contain few references. Although that may be a long-standing tradition in Chinese publishing, it also may occur because many university and local libraries in China lack extensive collections of world literature, most articles posted on the World Wide Web are not in free-access scientific journals, and there is generally low awareness of international websites that provide free access to journals, such as Health InterNetwork Access to Research Initiative (HINARI) and the Directory of Open Access Journals.

== See also ==
- Academic databases and search engines
- Citation index (Science Citation Index)
- China Medical Board
- China Social Sciences Publishing House
- China Science Publishing & Media
- Chinese Science Citation Database
- Chinese Social Sciences Citation Index
- HINARI
- Impact factor
- List of scientific journals
- MEDLINE
- Nature China
- Publishing in China
- PubMed Central
- Science and technology in the People's Republic of China
- ScienceDirect
- TEEAL
