= Chinese Academy of Sciences =

National academy for natural sciences in PRC

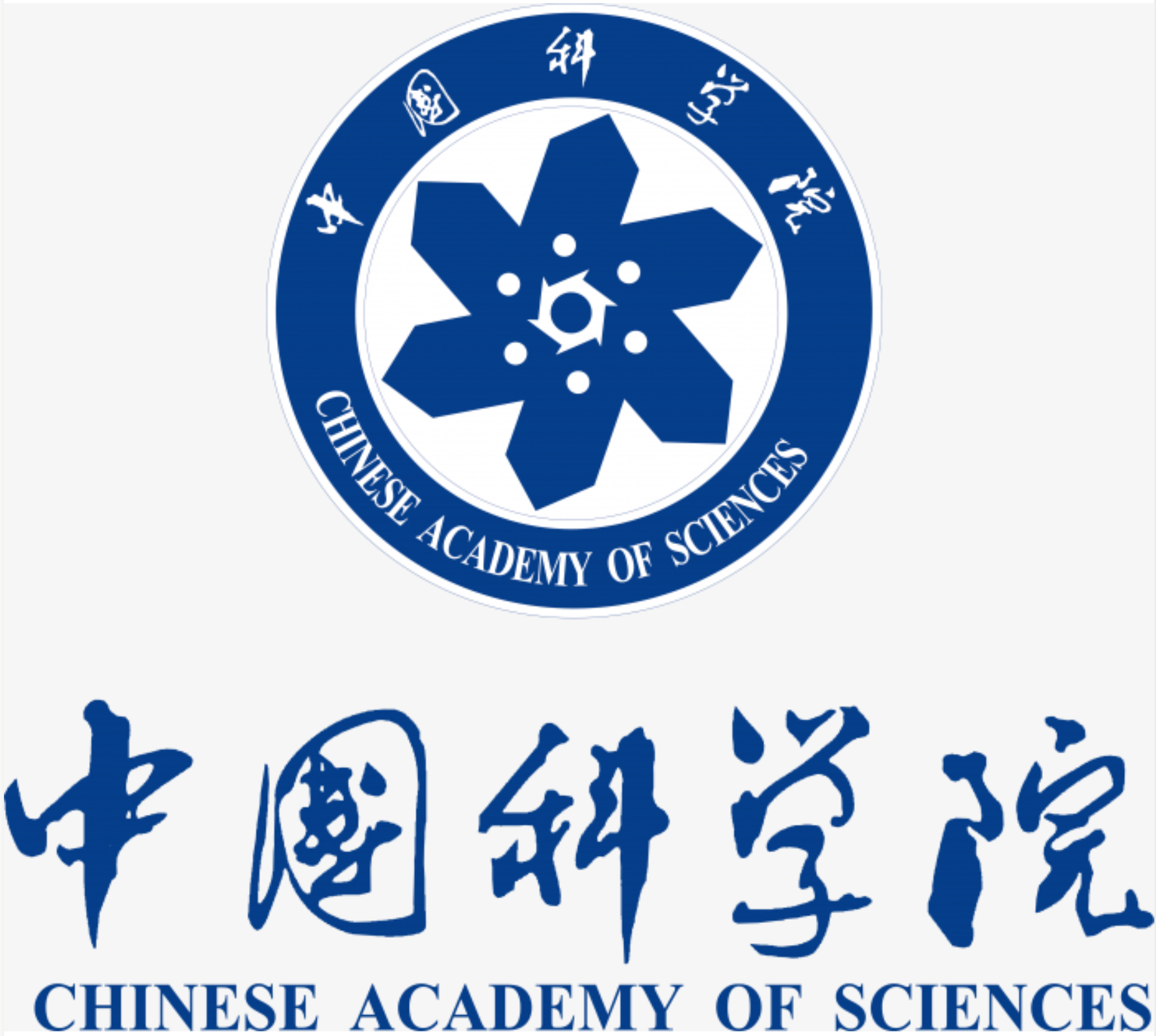
- Seal of the Academy
- Other name: 中国科学院 (Native Name)
- Parent institution: State Council of China
- Founder: Government Administration Council of the Central People's Government (merged to the State Council in 1954)
- Established: November 1949; 76 years ago
- Focus: Natural sciences
- President: Hou Jianguo
- Staff: 71,300 (2023)
- Key people: Wu Zhaohui, Vice President
- Budget: CN¥171 billion (2023)
- Subsidiaries: See list
- Formerly called: Academia Sinica (1949–1980s)
- Address: 52 Sanlihe Rd, Xicheng, Beijing, China
- Location: Nationwide, China
- Website: www.cas.cn

Chinese Academy of Sciences
- Simplified Chinese: 中国科学院
- Traditional Chinese: 中國科學院
Transcriptions
Standard Mandarin
- Hanyu Pinyin: Zhōngguó Kēxuéyuàn

The Chinese Academy of Sciences (CAS; Chinese: 中国科学院) is the national academy for natural sciences and the highest consultancy for science and technology of the People's Republic of China. It is the world's largest research organization, with 106 research institutes, 2 universities, 71,300 full-time employees, and 79,000 graduate students, and ranked first in the 2025 SCImago Institutions Rankings.

The Chinese Academy of Sciences has historical origins in the Academia Sinica during the Republican era and was formerly also known by that name until the 1980s. The academy functions as the national scientific think tank and academic governing body, providing advisory and appraisal services on issues stemming from the national economy, social development, and science and technology progress. It is headquartered in Beijing, with affiliate institutes throughout China. It has also created hundreds of commercial enterprises, Lenovo being one of the most famous.

CAS also runs the University of Science and Technology of China and the University of the Chinese Academy of Sciences, both of which were among the world's top three academic institutions in the Nature Index rankings as of 2024. CAS has also founded and spun off multiple companies, such as Sugon and GoLaxy.

== Membership ==
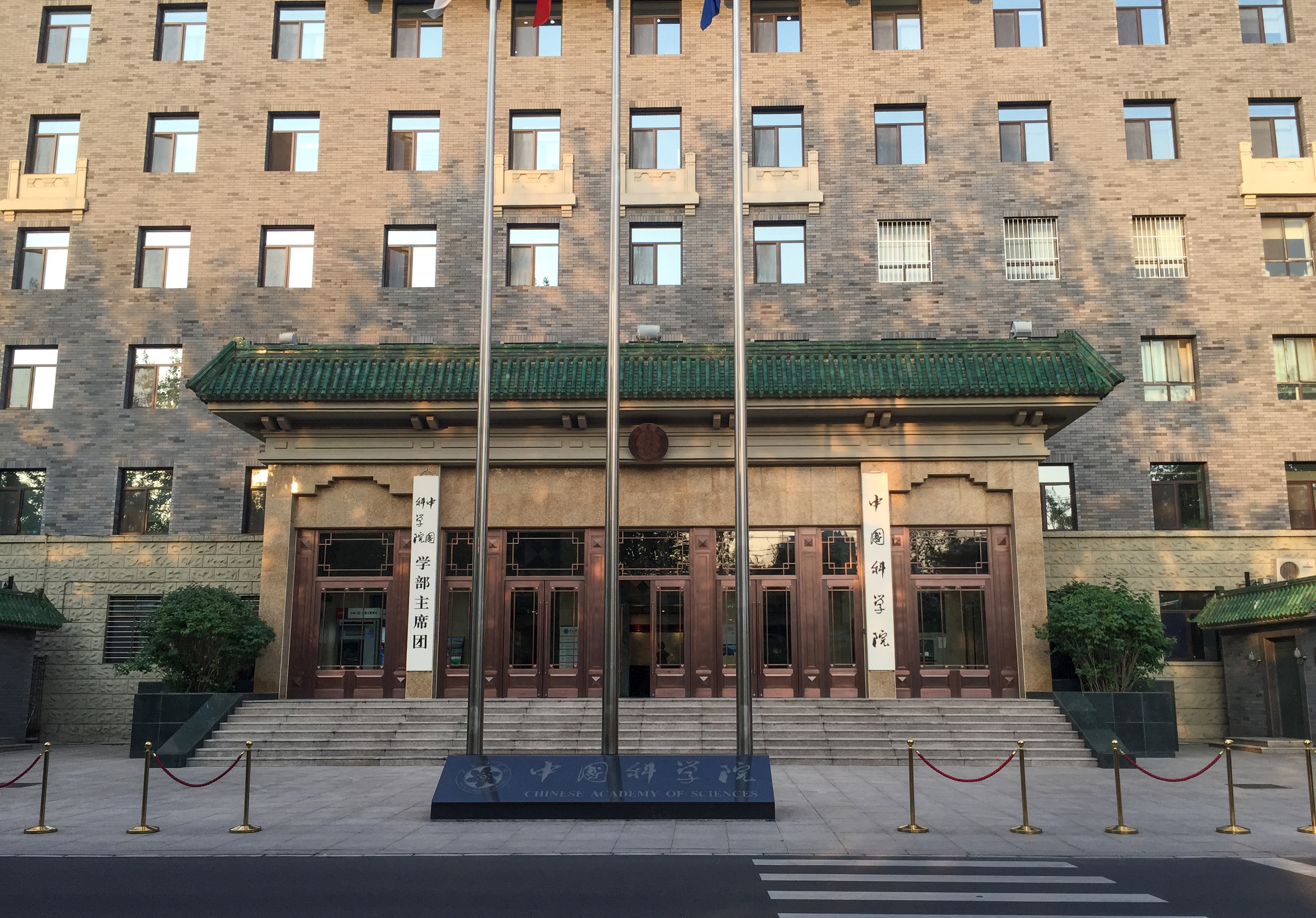
CAS headquarters building front in 2017

Membership of the Chinese Academy of Sciences, also known by the title Academician of the Chinese Academy of Sciences (中国科学院院士), is a lifelong honor given to Chinese scientists who have made significant achievements in various fields. According to the Bylaws for Members of the Chinese Academy of Sciences adopted in 1992 and recently amended in the year 2014, it is the highest academic title in China. A formal CAS member must hold Chinese citizenship, although foreign citizens may be elected as CAS foreign academicians. Members older than 80 are designated as "senior members" and may no longer hold leading positions in the organization. Academicians of the Chinese Academy of Sciences carry an obligation to advance science and technology, to advocate and uphold scientific spirit, to develop a scientific and technological workforce, to attend member meetings and receive consultation and evaluation tasks, and to promote international exchanges and cooperation. Academicians can give suggestions and influence Chinese state policy related to science and technology.

== History ==
At its founding in November 1949, CAS included many scientists who had studied in Western countries or worked for institutions of the Kuomintang government (like the Academia Sinica or the Beiping Academy). This resulted in worries by some in PRC leadership about the ideological orientation of CAS's members.

CAS formed its Institute of Hydrobiology in February 1950. War and conflict in the late Qing era and Republic of China era had damaged aquaculture and ruined aquaculture farms across China, and Chinese Communist Party (CCP) leaders recognized the socioeconomic importance of reviving aquaculture. The Institute of Hydrobiology focused on improving the genetic quality of the "Big Four" carp species, developing optimal practices for mixed-species farming, codifying knowledge on feeding and farm management, and developing improved fishpond fertilizer.

In 1956, China formally began its computing program when it launched the Twelve-Year Science Plan and formed the Beijing Institute of Computing Technology under the CAS.

In 1964, CAS debuted China's first self-developed large digital computer, the 119. The 119 was a core technology in facilitating China's first successful nuclear weapon test (Project 596), also in 1964.

Beginning in 1972, CAS began promoting the idea of balancing applied research with more theoretical research and in having scientific exchanges with other developing countries.

As vice premier, Deng Xiaoping in 1975 also sought to re-orient CAS towards more theoretical research, which had not been a focus during the Cultural Revolution. Deng emphasized that "the Academy of Sciences is an Academy of Sciences, not an Academy of Cabbage." Deng assigned CAS vice president Hu Yaobang to draft a plan for overhauling CAS. Deng and his aide Hu Qiaomu revised the draft and in September 1974 issued "The Outline Report on the Work of the Academy of Sciences". The Outline described scientific research in China as lagging behind the needs of socialist construction and the state of the advanced countries, and stated that to catch up, China should emphasize basic science in order to develop a sound theoretical foundation.

This approach to scientific reform fell out of political favor in 1976 when Deng was purged, although it continued to be supported by many members within CAS. A month before Deng's political return in 1977 however, the Outline Report was revived and adopted as CAS's official policy. During the Reform and Opening Up era, CAS discontinued its Soviet-style management model.

Shortly after his return, Deng hosted a series of meetings on science and education in which he stated that science should become the forerunner of China's modernization. Following these remarks, CAS prepared its goals for natural science disciplines to be achieved by 1985, stating that as a developing socialist country, China should strengthen basic scientific research through foreign exchanges.

To further promote this agenda, Deng began a campaign to promote the National Science Conference. A team led by CAS vice president Fang Yi instructed schools, factories, and communes to organize youth-focused events celebrating science and technology.

In 1977, the Department of Philosophy and Social Sciences was split off from CAS and reorganized into the Chinese Academy of Social Sciences, led by Hu Qiaomu.

CAS expanded to 110 research institutes by the end of 1978.

In 1980, the CAS publication Journal of Dialectics of Nature convened its first annual National Symposium on Artificial Intelligence, which included national and international scholars like Herbert A. Simon. The second annual symposium announced The Chinese Association for Artificial Intelligence (CAAI). CAAI has continued to be the largest AI association in China as of 2025.

Between 1984 and 1987, CAS began helping its members to "jump into the sea" and establish science and technology firms.

The Graduate School of the Chinese Academy of Sciences was established in 2001 as a successor to the Graduate School of the University of Science and Technology of China (Beijing).The Ministry of Education (MOE) approved the Graduate School of the Chinese Academy of Sciences (CAS) application to change its name to the University of the Chinese Academy of Sciences (UCAS) on July 23, 2012. Additionally, the MOE recommended that CAS discontinue the operation of the CAS Graduate School. In 2023, the Pasteur Institute suspended ties with CAS.

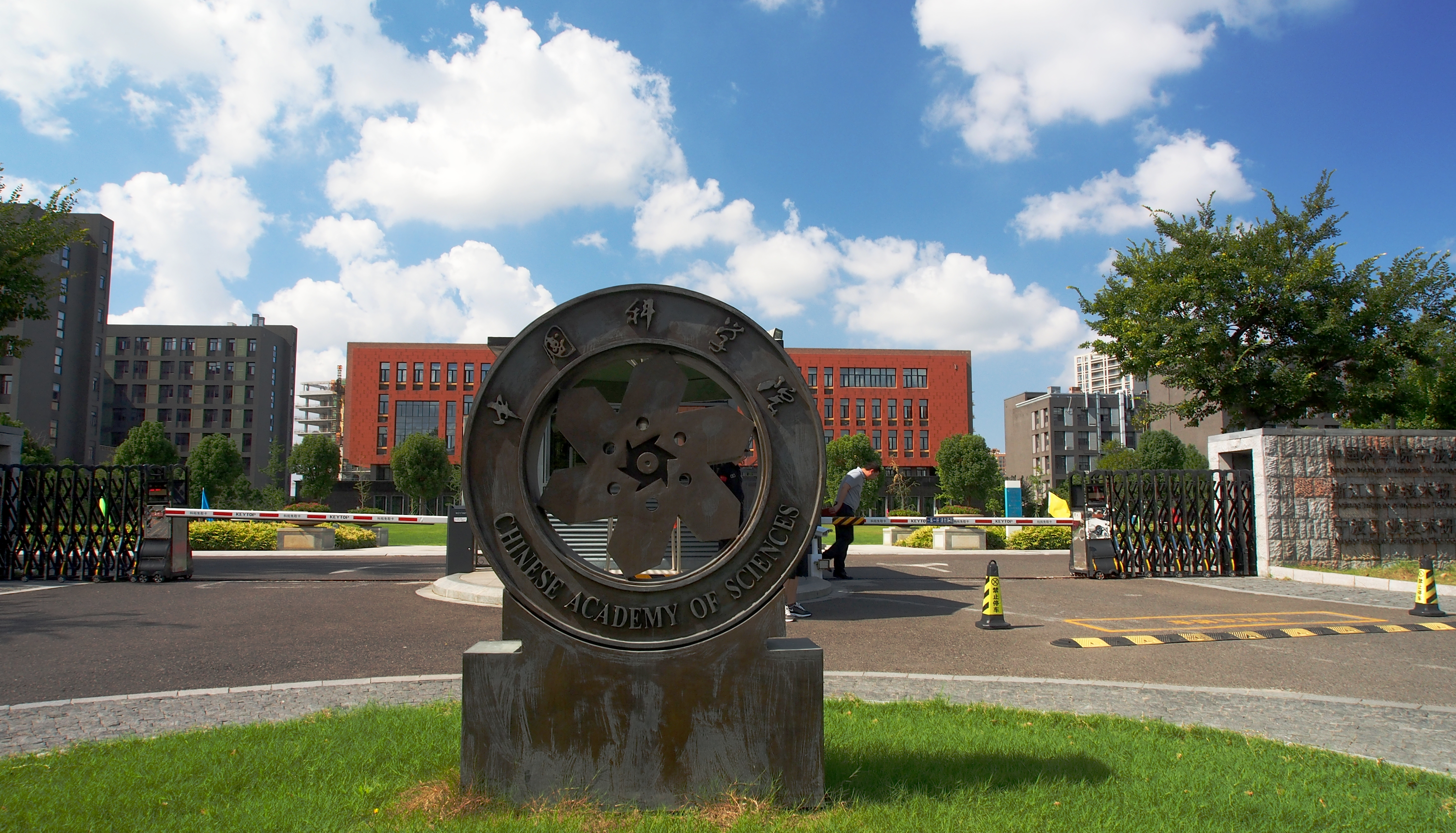
Main entrance to Ningbo Institute of Industrial Technology, CAS, in Ningbo, Zhejiang

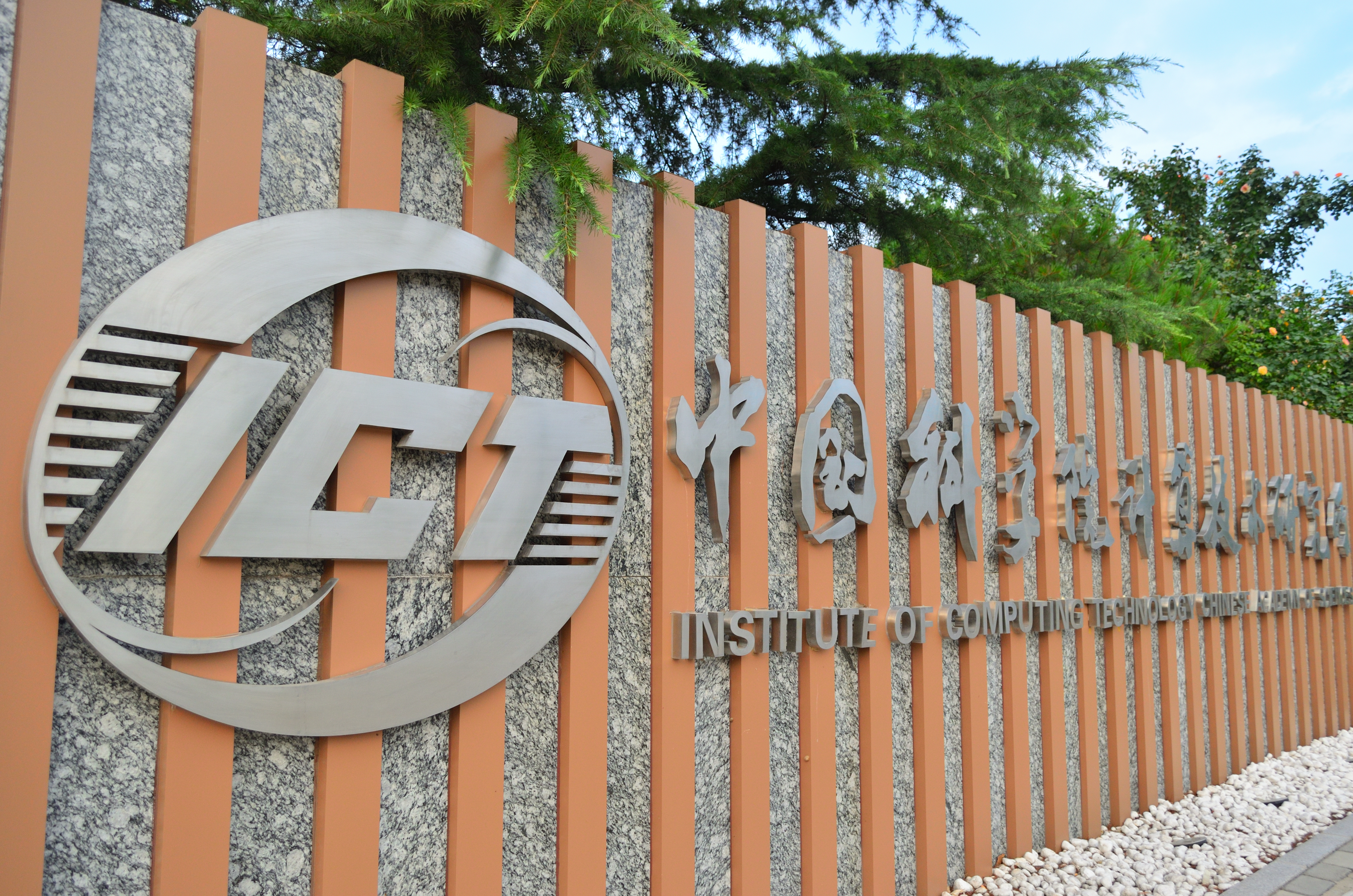
Institute of Computing Technology Chinese Academy of Sciences in Beijing

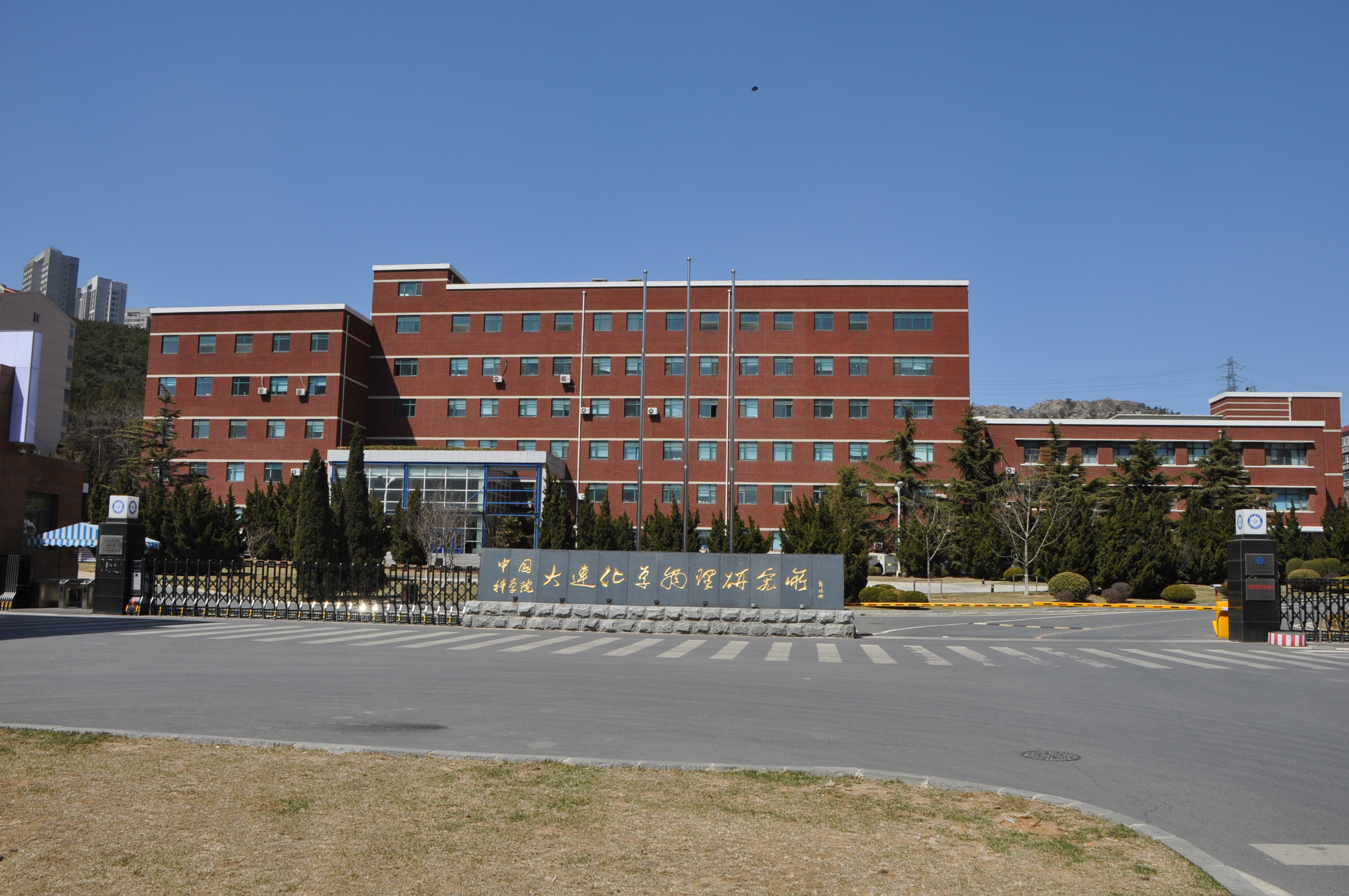
Dalian Institute of Chemical Physics, Chinese Academy of Sciences

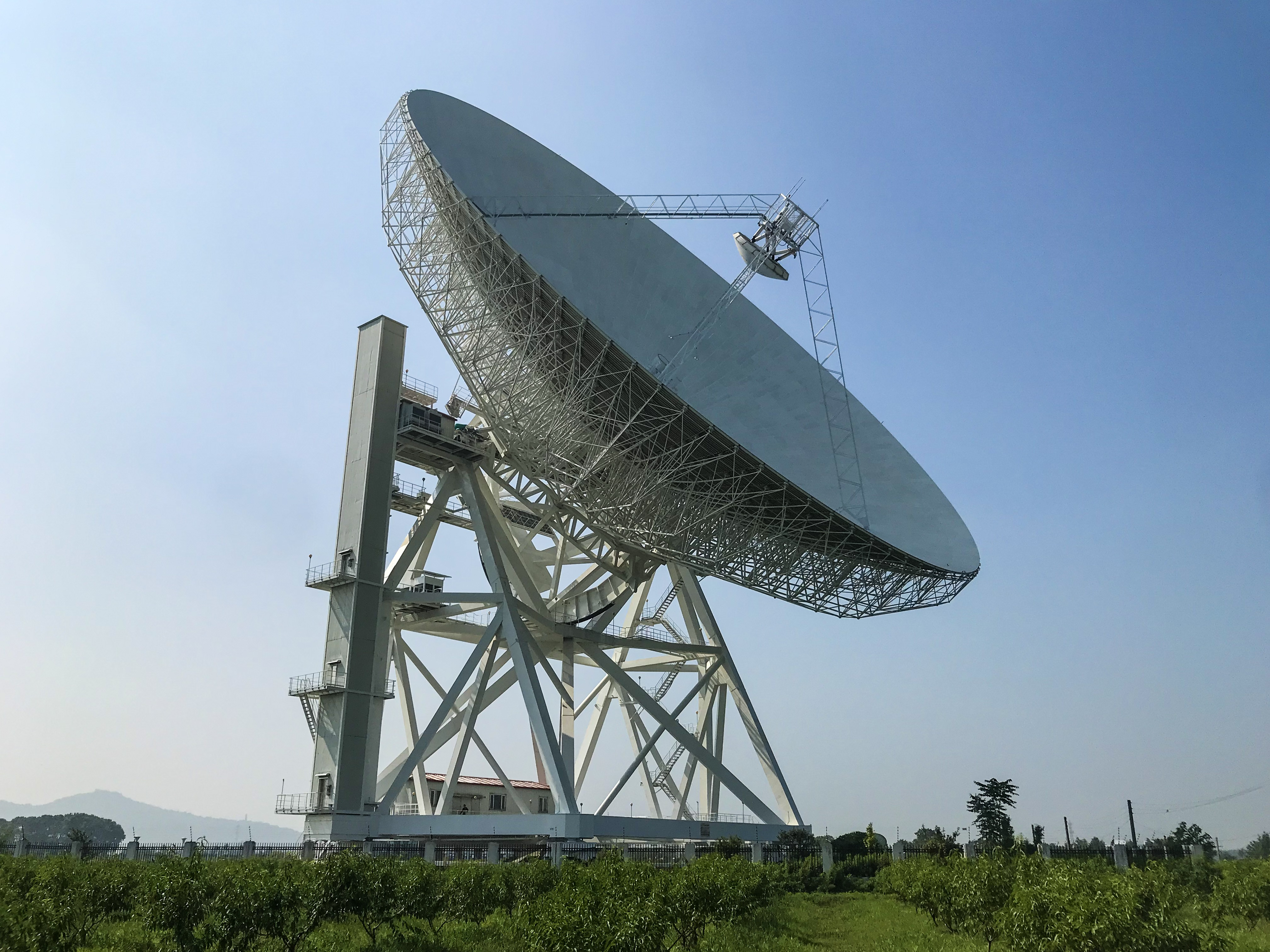
Tianma 65-meter Radio Telescope in Shanghai Astronomical Observatory

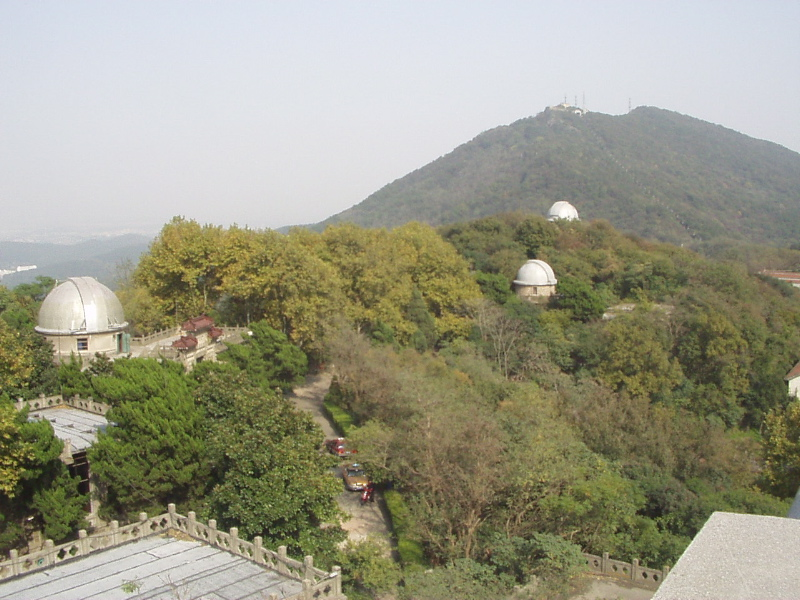
Purple Mountain Observatory

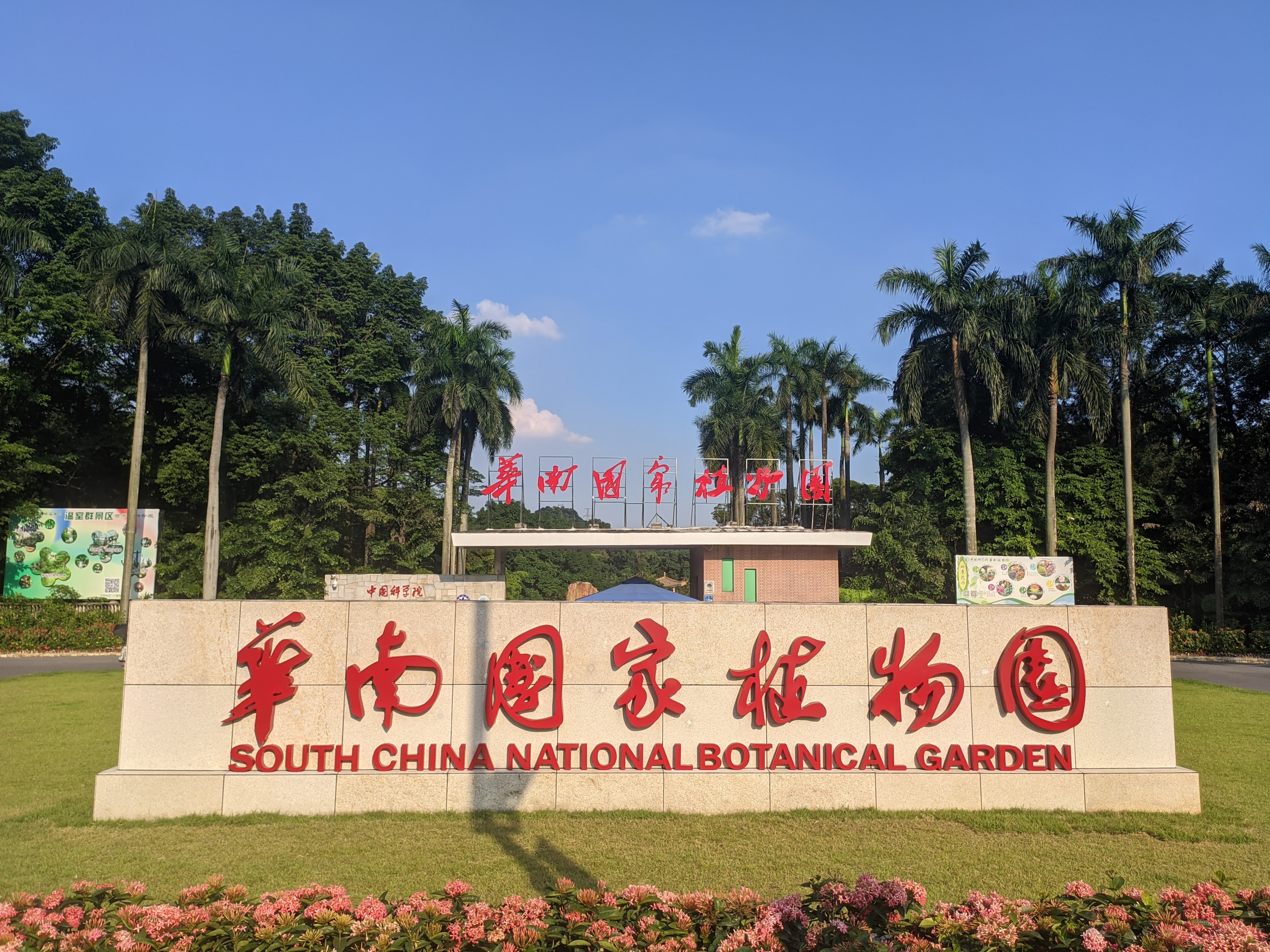
South China National Botanical Garden

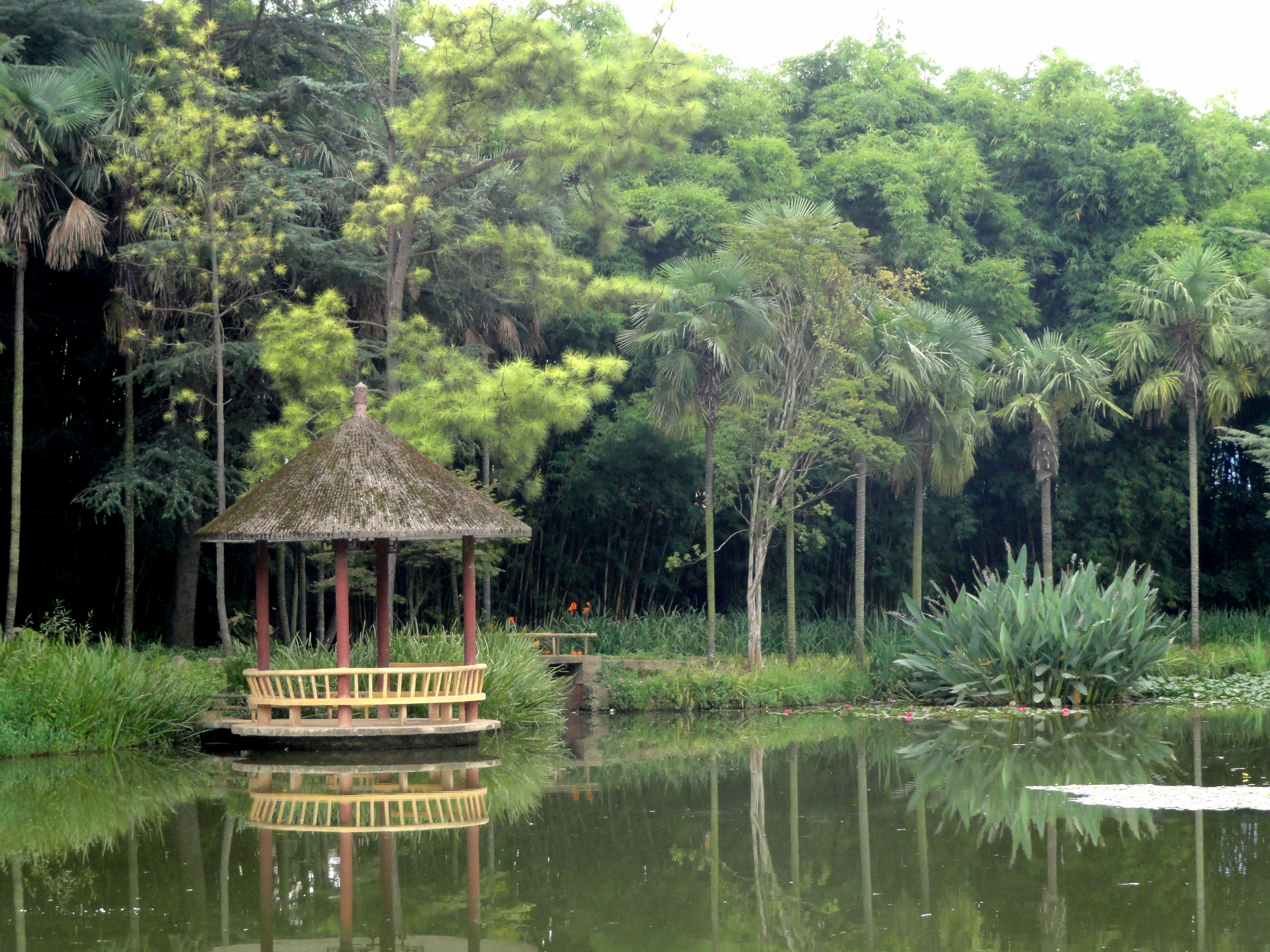
Kunming Institute of Botany

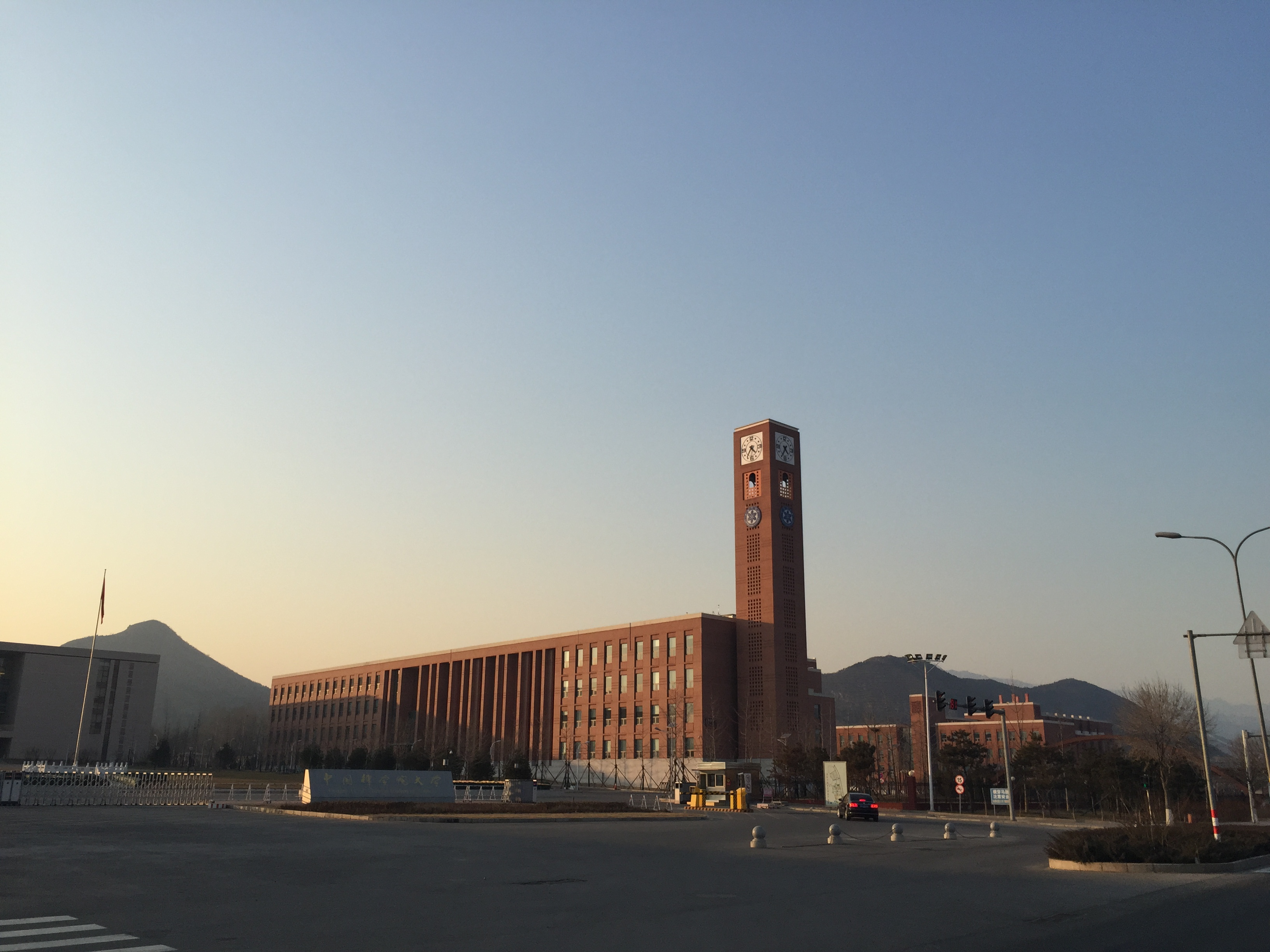
UCAS

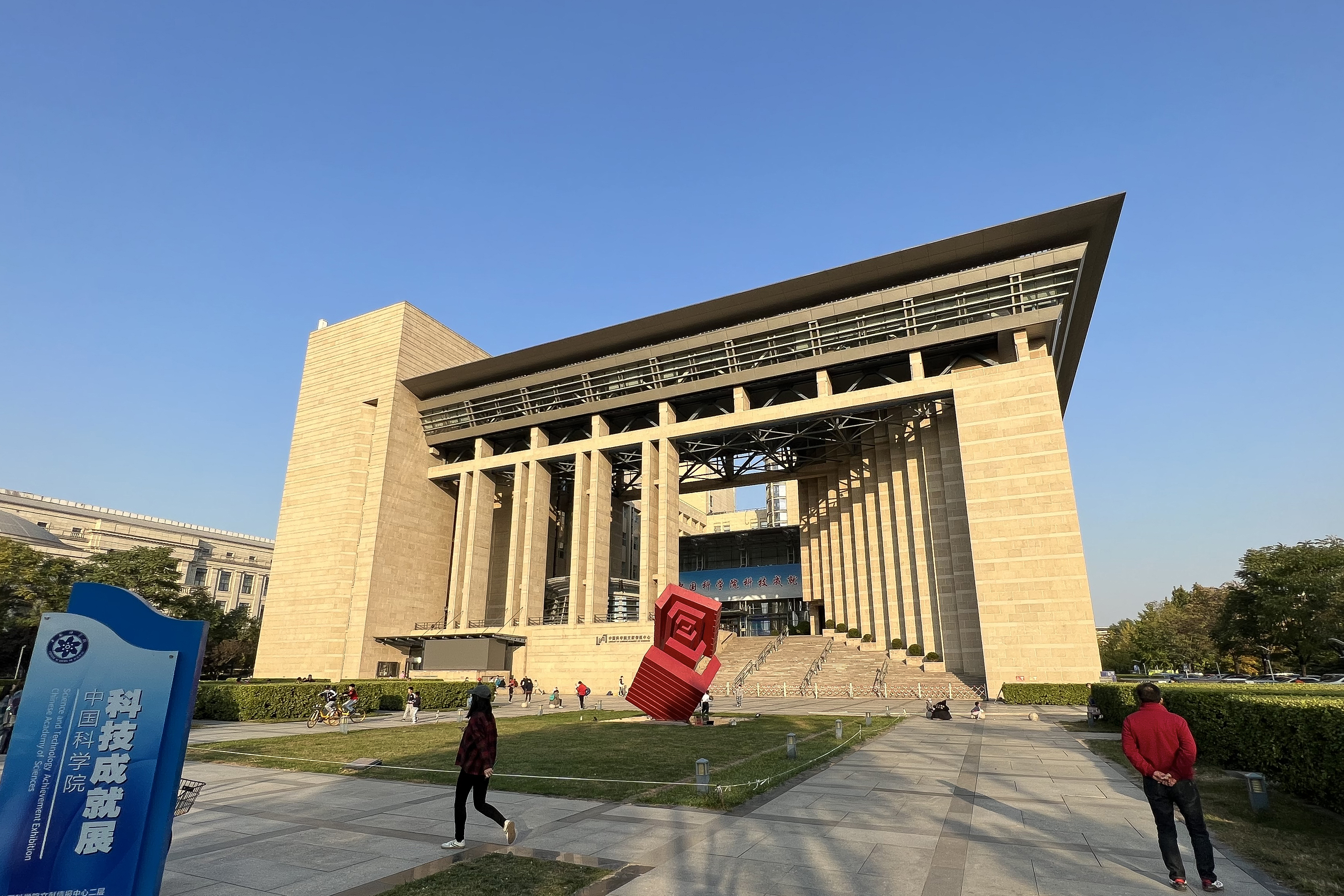
Chinese Academy of Sciences Documentation and Intelligence Center

== Scientific integrity ==
On 26 February 2007, CAS published a Declaration of Scientific Ideology and set up a commission for scientific integrity to promote transparency, autonomy, and accountability of scientific research in the country. Around that same time, the Ministry of Science and Technology also initiated measures to address misconduct in state-funded programs.

CAS also publishes the Early Warning List, which notes journals with a lack of rigor and possible predatory practices.

== Publications ==
Science China
- Language: English

Standard abbreviations
- ISO 4: Sci. China

Together with the National Natural Science Foundation of China, the academy publishes the peer-reviewed academic journal, Science China (also known as Science in China). Science China comprises seven series:

- A: Mathematics
- B: Chemistry
- C: Life Sciences
- D: Earth Sciences
- E: Technological Sciences
- F: Information Sciences
- G: Physics, Mechanics and Astronomy

CAS also promotes the China Open Access Journals (COAJ) platform, a national variant of the international Directory of Open Access Journals (DOAJ).

== Awards ==
Since 1999, the CAS has issued the annual State Preeminent Science and Technology Award, presented by the President of China to the recipient.

== Ranking and reputation ==
CAS has been ranked the No. 1 research institute in the world by Nature Index since the list's inception in 2014 by Nature Portfolio.

It was the most productive institution publishing articles on sustainable development indexed in the Web of Science from 1981 to 2018 among all universities and research institutions in the world.

The academy also runs the University of Science and Technology of China and the University of the Chinese Academy of Sciences, both of which were among the world's top three universities in the Nature Index ranking as of 2024.

In 2024, Clarivate's Highly Cited Researchers list contained 308 CSA members. This made CSA researchers the largest group on the list by institution, and the sixth largest by country.

== International cooperation ==
The Institute of Remote Sensing and Digital Earth is a branch of CAS. The Institute of Remote Sensing and Digital Earth was a customer of Swedish Space Corporation (SSC), which provides data transmission services from satellites for a wide range of societal functions. It was reported by Reuters on 21 September 2020 that SSC decided not to renew the contracts with China to help operate Chinese satellites from SSC's ground stations, or seek new business with China.

== See also ==
- Academia Sinica
- CAS Star
- CAS Space
- China Science Publishing & Media
- Chinese Academy of Engineering
- Chinese Academy of Social Sciences
- Chinese Science Citation Database
- Hanlin Academy
- History of science and technology in the People's Republic of China
- International Journal of Software and Informatics (IJSI)
- International Society of Zoological Sciences
- Legend Holdings
- Science and technology in China
- Scientific publishing in China
- Shanghai Academy of Social Sciences
- ShanghaiTech University
- University of Chinese Academy of Sciences
- University of Science and Technology of China
- University of Chinese Academy of Social Sciences
- Academician of the Chinese Academy of Sciences
