= Henry Kissinger =

American diplomat and politician (1923–2023)

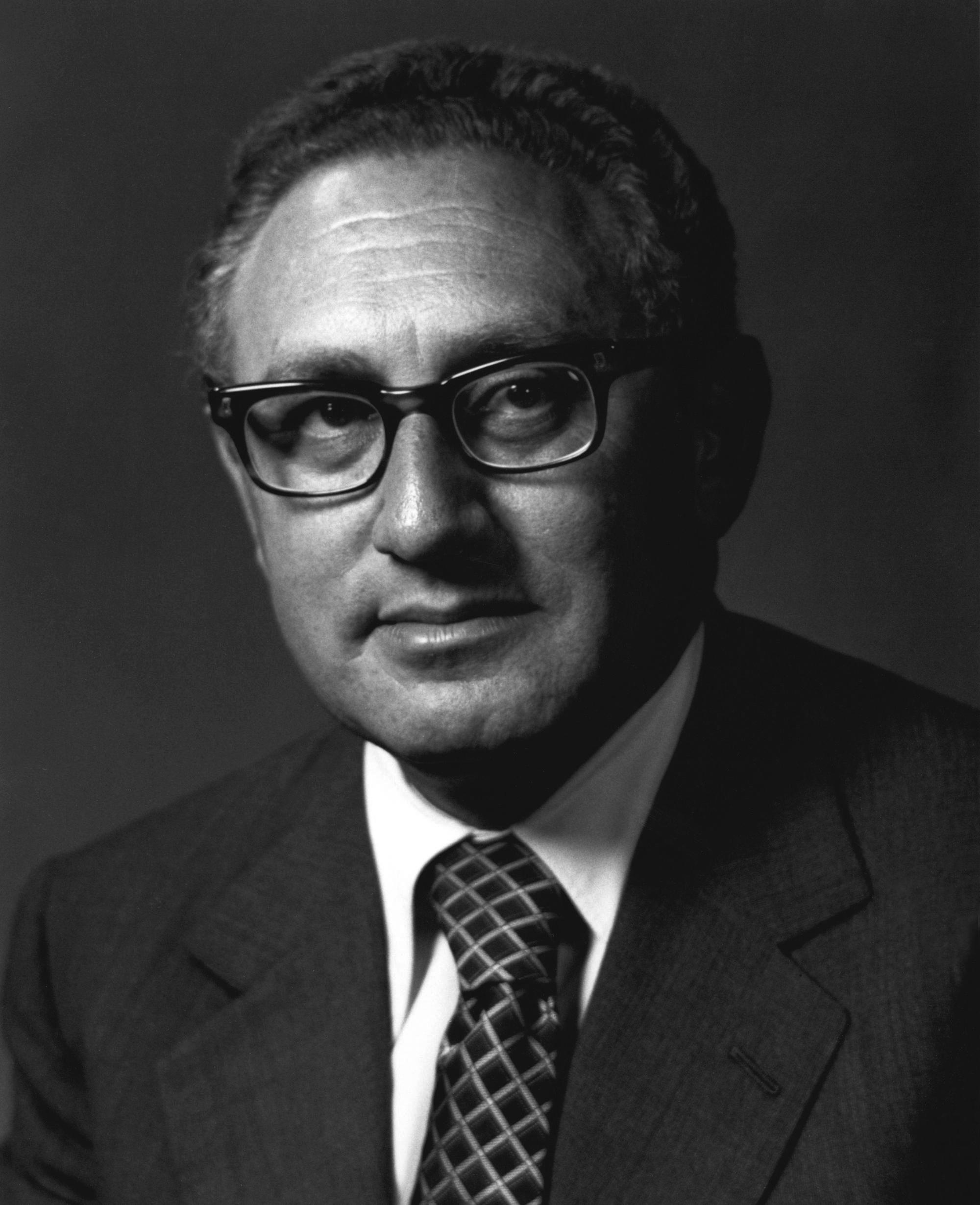
- Official portrait, c. 1973

56th United States Secretary of State
- In office September 22, 1973 – January 20, 1977
- President: Richard Nixon; Gerald Ford
- Deputy: Kenneth Rush; Robert Ingersoll; Charles Robinson
- Preceded by: William Rogers
- Succeeded by: Cyrus Vance

7th United States National Security Advisor
- In office January 20, 1969 – November 3, 1975
- President: Richard Nixon; Gerald Ford
- Deputy: Richard Allen; Alexander Haig; Brent Scowcroft
- Preceded by: Walt Rostow
- Succeeded by: Brent Scowcroft
Other offices
Chair of the 9/11 Commission
In office November 27, 2002 – December 14, 2002
| President | George W. Bush |
| Deputy | George J. Mitchell; Lee Hamilton |
| Preceded by | Position established |
| Succeeded by | Thomas Kean |
22nd Chancellor of the College of William and Mary
In office July 1, 2000 – October 1, 2005
| President | Timothy J. Sullivan; Gene Nichol |
| Preceded by | Margaret Thatcher |
| Succeeded by | Sandra Day O'Connor |

Personal details
- Born: Heinz Alfred Kissinger; May 27, 1923 Fürth, Bavaria, Weimar Germany
- Died: November 29, 2023 (aged 100) Kent, Connecticut, U.S.
- Resting place: Arlington National Cemetery
- Citizenship: Germany (before 1935); Stateless (1935–1943); United States (1943–2023)
- Party: Republican
- Spouses: Ann Fleischer (m. 1949; div. 1964); Nancy Maginnes (m. 1974)
- Children: 2
- Education: City College of New York (attended); Harvard University (AB, AM, PhD)
- Civilian awards: See full list
- Website: Personal website

Military service
- Allegiance: United States
- Branch/service: United States Army
- Years of service: 1943–1946
- Rank: Sergeant
- Unit: 84th Infantry Division; 970th Counter Intelligence Corps Detachment
- Battles/wars: World War II; Battle of the Bulge
- Military awards: Bronze Star Medal
- Kissinger's voice Kissinger on early Cold War strategy Recorded July 13, 1958

Henry Alfred Kissinger (Note: Pronounced /ˈkɪsəndʒər/ KISS-ən-jər.) (May 27, 1923 – November 29, 2023) was an American diplomat, political scientist, and politician. A member of the Republican Party, he served as the 7th national security advisor from 1969 to 1975 and as the 56th United States secretary of state from 1973 to 1977, serving under presidents Richard Nixon and Gerald Ford.

Born in Germany, Kissinger emigrated to the United States in 1938 as a Jewish refugee fleeing Nazi persecution. He served in the U.S. Army during World War II. After the war, he attended Harvard University, where he excelled academically. He later became a professor of government at the university and earned an international reputation as an expert on nuclear weapons and foreign policy. He acted as a consultant to government agencies, think tanks, and the presidential campaigns of Nelson Rockefeller and Nixon before being appointed as national security advisor and later secretary of state by President Nixon.

An advocate of a pragmatic approach to geopolitics known as Realpolitik, Kissinger pioneered the policy of détente with the Soviet Union, orchestrated an opening of relations with China, engaged in "shuttle diplomacy" in the Middle East to end the Yom Kippur War, and negotiated the Paris Peace Accords, which ended American involvement in the Vietnam War. For his role in negotiating the accords, he was awarded the 1973 Nobel Peace Prize, which sparked controversy. Kissinger is also associated with controversial U.S. policies including its bombing of Cambodia, involvement in the 1971 Bolivian and 1973 Chilean coups d'état, and support for Argentina's military junta in its Dirty War, Indonesia in its invasion of East Timor, and Pakistan during the Bangladesh Liberation War and Bangladesh genocide. Considered by many American scholars to have been an effective secretary of state, Kissinger was also accused by critics of war crimes for the civilian death toll of the policies he pursued and for his role in facilitating U.S. support for authoritarian regimes.

After leaving government, Kissinger founded Kissinger Associates, an international geopolitical consulting firm which he ran from 1982 until his death. He authored over a dozen books on diplomatic history and international relations. His advice was sought by American presidents of both major political parties.

== Early life and education ==
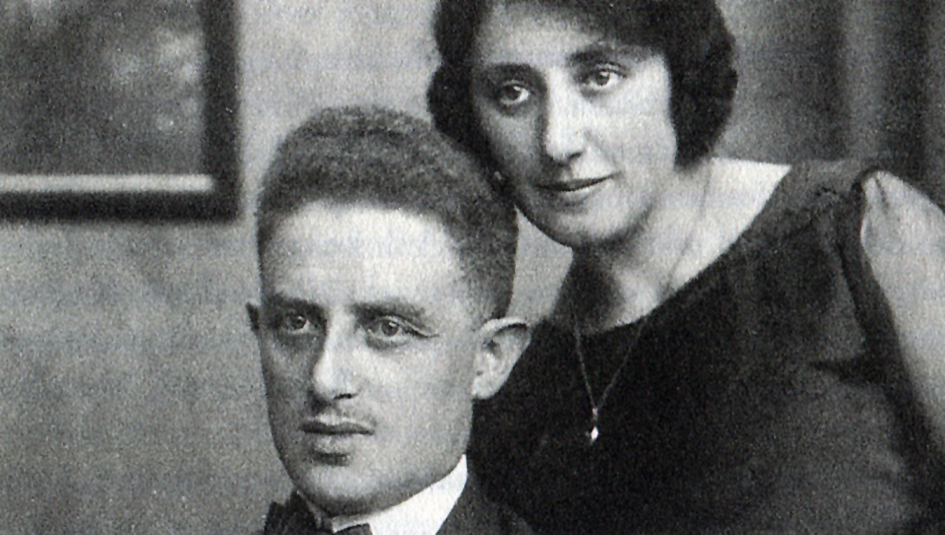
Kissinger's parents, Louis and Paula, in 1921

Kissinger was born Heinz Alfred Kissinger (Note: German pronunciation: [haɪnts ˈʔalfʁeːt ˈkɪsɪŋɐ]) on May 27, 1923, in Fürth, Bavaria, Weimar Germany. He was the son of homemaker Paula (née Stern), from Leutershausen, and Louis Kissinger, a school teacher. He had a younger brother, Walter, who was a businessman. Kissinger's family was German-Jewish. His great-great-grandfather Meyer Löb adopted "Kissinger" as his surname in 1817, taking it from the Bavarian spa town of Bad Kissingen. In his childhood, Kissinger enjoyed playing soccer. He played for the youth team of SpVgg Fürth, one of the nation's best clubs at the time.

In a 2022 BBC interview, Kissinger vividly recalled being nine years old in 1933 and learning of Adolf Hitler's election as Chancellor of Germany, which proved to be a profound turning point for the Kissinger family. During Nazi rule, Kissinger and his friends were regularly harassed and beaten by Hitler Youth gangs. Kissinger sometimes defied the segregation imposed by Nazi racial laws by sneaking into soccer stadiums to watch matches, often receiving beatings from security guards. As a result of the Nazis' anti-Semitic laws, Kissinger was unable to gain admittance to the Gymnasium and his father was dismissed from his teaching job.

On August 20, 1938, when Kissinger was 15 years old, he and his family fled Germany to avoid further Nazi persecution. The family briefly stopped in London before arriving in New York City on September 5. Kissinger later downplayed the influence his experiences of Nazi persecution had had on his policies and view of the world, writing that the "Germany of my youth had a great deal of order and very little justice; it was not the sort of place likely to inspire devotion to order in the abstract." Nevertheless, many scholars, including Kissinger's biographer Walter Isaacson, have argued that his experiences influenced the formation of his realist approach to foreign policy.

Kissinger spent his high-school years in the German-Jewish community in Washington Heights, Manhattan. Although Kissinger assimilated quickly into American culture, he never lost his pronounced Franconian German accent, due to childhood shyness that made him hesitant to speak. After his first year at George Washington High School, he completed school at night while working in a shaving brush factory during the day.

Kissinger studied accounting at the City College of New York, excelling academically as a part-time student while continuing to work. His studies were interrupted in early 1943, when he was drafted into the U.S. Army.

=== U.S. Army ===
Kissinger underwent basic training at Camp Croft in Spartanburg, South Carolina. On June 19, 1943, while stationed in South Carolina, he became a naturalized U.S. citizen. The army sent him to study engineering at Lafayette College in Pennsylvania under the Army Specialized Training Program, but the program was canceled and Kissinger was reassigned to the 84th Infantry Division. There, he made the acquaintance of Fritz Kraemer, a fellow immigrant from Germany who noted Kissinger's fluency in German and his intellect and arranged for him to be assigned to the division's military intelligence. According to Vernon A. Walters, Kissinger also received training at Camp Ritchie, Maryland, before being shipped to Europe. Kissinger saw combat with the division and volunteered for hazardous intelligence duties during the Battle of the Bulge. On April 10, 1945, he participated in the liberation of the Hannover-Ahlem concentration camp, a subcamp of the Neuengamme concentration camp. At the time, Kissinger wrote in his journal, "I had never seen people degraded to the level that people were in Ahlem. They barely looked human. They were skeletons." After the initial shock, however, Kissinger was relatively silent about his wartime service.

During the American advance into Germany, Kissinger, though only a private, was put in charge of the administration of the city of Krefeld because of a lack of German speakers on the division's intelligence staff. Within eight days he had established a civilian administration. Kissinger was then reassigned to the Counter Intelligence Corps (CIC), where he became a CIC Special Agent holding the enlisted rank of sergeant. He was given charge of a team in Hanover assigned to tracking down Gestapo officers and saboteurs, for which he was awarded the Bronze Star. Kissinger drew up a comprehensive list of all known Gestapo employees in the Bergstraße region, and had them rounded up. By the end of July, 12 men had been arrested. In March 1947, Fritz Girke, Hans Hellenbroich, Michael Raaf, and Karl Stattmann were subsequently caught and tried by the Dachau Military Tribunal for killing two American prisoners of war. The four men were all found guilty and sentenced to death. They were executed by hanging at Landsberg Prison in October 1948.

In June 1945, Kissinger was made commandant of the Bensheim metro CIC detachment, Bergstraße district of Hesse, with responsibility for denazification of the district. Although he possessed absolute authority and powers of arrest, Kissinger took care to avoid abuses against the local population by his command.

In 1946, Kissinger was reassigned to teach at the European Command Intelligence School at Camp King and, as a civilian employee following his separation from the army, continued to serve in this role.

Kissinger recalled that his experience in the army "made me feel like an American".

== Academic career ==
Kissinger earned his Bachelor of Arts summa cum laude, Phi Beta Kappa in political science from Harvard College in 1950, where he lived in Adams House and studied under William Yandell Elliott. His senior undergraduate thesis, titled The Meaning of History: Reflections on Spengler, Toynbee and Kant, was over 400 pages long, and provoked Harvard's current cap on the length of undergraduate theses (35,000 words). He earned his Master of Arts and Doctor of Philosophy at Harvard University in 1951 and 1954, respectively. In 1952, while still a graduate student at Harvard, he served as a consultant to the director of the Psychological Strategy Board, and founded a magazine, Confluence. At that time, he sought to work as a spy for the FBI.

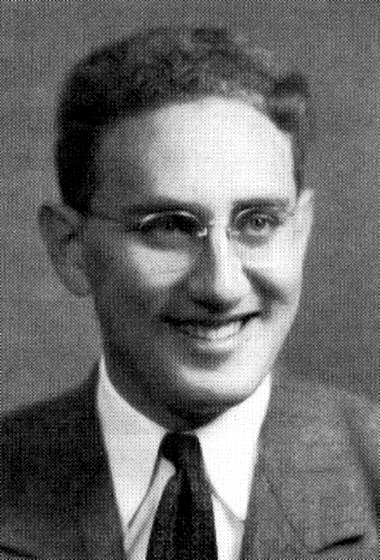
Portrait of Kissinger as a Harvard senior in 1950

Kissinger's doctoral dissertation was titled Peace, Legitimacy, and the Equilibrium (A Study of the Statesmanship of Castlereagh and Metternich). Stephen Graubard, Kissinger's friend, asserted that Kissinger primarily pursued such endeavor to instruct himself on the history of power play between European states in the 19th century. In his doctoral dissertation, Kissinger first introduced the concept of "legitimacy", which he defined as: "Legitimacy as used here should not be confused with justice. It means no more than an international agreement about the nature of workable arrangements and about the permissible aims and methods of foreign policy". An international order accepted by all of the major powers is "legitimate" whereas an international order not accepted by one or more of the great powers is "revolutionary" and hence dangerous. Thus, when after the Congress of Vienna in 1815, the leaders of Britain, France, Austria, Prussia, and Russia agreed to co-operate in the Concert of Europe to preserve the peace after Austria, Prussia, and Russia participated in a series of three Partitions of Poland, in Kissinger's viewpoint this international system was "legitimate" because it was accepted by the leaders of all five of the Great Powers of Europe. Notably, Kissinger's Primat der Außenpolitik (Primacy of foreign policy) approach to diplomacy took it for granted that as long as the decision-makers in the major states were willing to accept the international order, then it is "legitimate" with questions of public opinion and morality dismissed as irrelevant. His dissertation also won him the Senator Charles Sumner Prize, an award given to the best dissertation "from the legal, political, historical, economic, social, or ethnic approach, dealing with any means or measures tending toward the prevention of war and the establishment of universal peace" by a student under the Harvard Department of Government. It was published in 1957 as A World Restored: Metternich, Castlereagh and the Problems of Peace 1812–1822.

Kissinger remained at Harvard as a member of the faculty in the Department of Government where he served as the director of the Harvard International Seminar between 1951 and 1971, and he taught prominent students such as Joseph Nye. In 1955, he was a consultant to the National Security Council's Operations Coordinating Board. During 1955 and 1956, he was also study director in nuclear weapons and foreign policy at the Council on Foreign Relations. He released his book Nuclear Weapons and Foreign Policy the following year. The book, which criticized the Eisenhower administration's massive retaliation nuclear doctrine, caused much controversy at the time by proposing the use of tactical nuclear weapons on a regular basis to win wars. That same year, he published A World Restored, a study of balance-of-power politics in post-Napoleonic Europe.

External videos
- Mike Wallace interview with Kissinger, July 13, 1958

From 1956 to 1958, Kissinger worked for the Rockefeller Brothers Fund as director of its Special Studies Project. He served as the director of the Harvard Defense Studies Program between 1958 and 1971. In 1958, he also co-founded the Center for International Affairs with Robert R. Bowie where he served as its associate director. Outside of academia, he served as a consultant to several government agencies and think tanks, including the Operations Research Office, the Arms Control and Disarmament Agency, Department of State, and the RAND Corporation.

Keen to have a greater influence on U.S. foreign policy, Kissinger became foreign policy advisor to the presidential campaigns of Nelson Rockefeller, supporting his bids for the Republican nomination in 1960, 1964, and 1968. Kissinger first met Richard Nixon at a party hosted by Clare Boothe Luce in 1967, saying that he found him more "thoughtful" than he expected. During the Republican primaries in 1968, Kissinger again served as the foreign policy adviser to Rockefeller and in July 1968 called Nixon "the most dangerous of all the men running to have as president". Initially upset when Nixon won the Republican nomination, the ambitious Kissinger soon changed his mind about Nixon and contacted a Nixon campaign aide, Richard Allen, to state he was willing to do anything to help Nixon win. After Nixon became president in January 1969, Kissinger was appointed as National Security Advisor. By this time, he was arguably "one of the most important theorists about foreign policy ever to be produced by the United States", according to his official biographer Niall Ferguson.

== Foreign policy ==
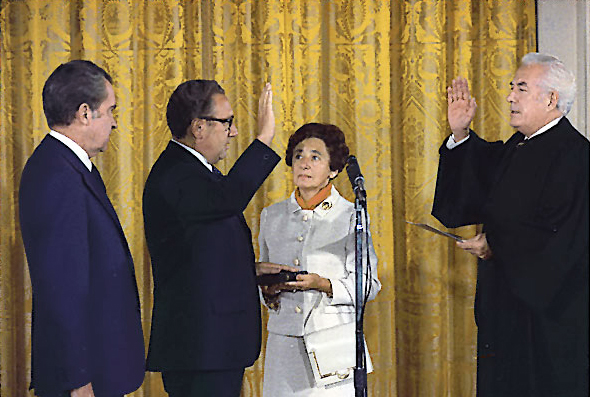
Kissinger being sworn in as Secretary of State by Chief Justice Warren Burger, September 22, 1973. Kissinger's mother, Paula, holds the Bible as President Nixon looks on.

Kissinger served as National Security Advisor and Secretary of State under President Richard Nixon and continued as Secretary of State under Nixon's successor Gerald Ford. With the death of George Shultz in February 2021, Kissinger was the last surviving member of the Nixon administration Cabinet.

The relationship between Nixon and Kissinger was unusually close, and has been compared to the relationships of Woodrow Wilson and Colonel House, or Franklin D. Roosevelt and Harry Hopkins. In all three cases, the State Department was relegated to a backseat role in developing foreign policy. Kissinger and Nixon shared a penchant for secrecy and conducted numerous "backchannel" negotiations, such as that through the Soviet Ambassador to the United States, Anatoly Dobrynin, that excluded State Department experts. Historian David Rothkopf looked at the personalities of Nixon and Kissinger, saying:

They were a fascinating pair. In a way, they complemented each other perfectly. Kissinger was the charming and worldly Mr. Outside who provided the grace and intellectual-establishment respectability that Nixon lacked, disdained and aspired to. Kissinger was an international citizen. Nixon very much a classic American. Kissinger had a worldview and a facility for adjusting it to meet the times, Nixon had pragmatism and a strategic vision that provided the foundations for their policies. Kissinger would, of course, say that he was not political like Nixon—but in fact he was just as political as Nixon, just as calculating, just as relentlessly ambitious ... these self-made men were driven as much by their need for approval and their neuroses as by their strengths.

A proponent of Realpolitik, Kissinger played a dominant role in United States foreign policy between 1969 and 1977. In that period, he extended the policy of détente. This policy led to a significant relaxation in U.S.–Soviet tensions and played a crucial role in 1971 talks with the People's Republic of China premier Zhou Enlai. The talks concluded with a rapprochement between the United States and China, and the formation of a new strategic anti-Soviet Sino-American alignment. He was jointly awarded the 1973 Nobel Peace Prize with Lê Đức Thọ for helping to establish a ceasefire and U.S. withdrawal from Vietnam. The ceasefire, however, was not durable. Thọ declined to accept the award and Kissinger appeared deeply ambivalent about it—he donated his prize money to charity, did not attend the award ceremony, and later offered to return his prize medal. As National Security Advisor in 1974, Kissinger directed the much-debated National Security Study Memorandum 200.

=== Détente and opening to the People's Republic of China ===
Kissinger initially had little interest in China when he began his work as National Security Adviser in 1969, and the driving force behind the rapprochement with China was Nixon. Like Nixon, Kissinger believed that relations with China would help the United States exit the Vietnam War and obtain long-term strategic benefits in confrontations with the Soviet Union.

In April 1970, both Nixon and Kissinger promised Chiang Ching-kuo, the son of Generalissimo Chiang Kai-shek, that they would never abandon Taiwan or make any compromises with Mao Zedong, although Nixon did speak vaguely of his wish to improve relations with the People's Republic.

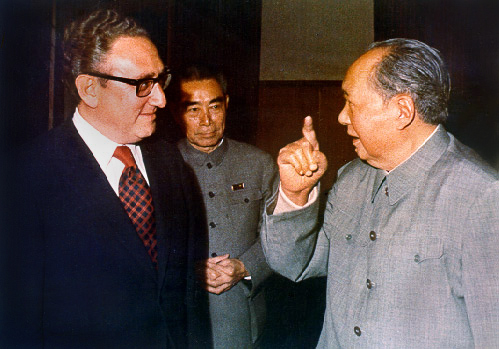
Kissinger, shown here with Zhou Enlai and Mao Zedong, negotiated rapprochement with China.

Kissinger made two trips to the People's Republic in July and October 1971 (the first of which was made in secret) to confer with Premier Zhou Enlai, then in charge of Chinese foreign policy. During his visit to Beijing, the main issue turned out to be Taiwan, as Zhou demanded the United States recognize that Taiwan was a legitimate part of the People's Republic, pull U.S. forces out of Taiwan, and end military support for the Kuomintang regime. Kissinger gave way by promising to pull U.S. forces out of Taiwan, saying two-thirds would be pulled out when the Vietnam war ended and the rest to be pulled out as Sino-American relations improved.

In October 1971, as Kissinger was making his second trip to the People's Republic, the issue of which Chinese government deserved to be represented in the United Nations came up again. Out of concern to not be seen abandoning an ally, the United States tried to promote a compromise under which both Chinese regimes would be United Nations members, although Kissinger called it "an essentially doomed rearguard action". While American ambassador to the United Nations George H. W. Bush was lobbying for the "two Chinas" formula, Kissinger was removing favorable references to Taiwan from a speech that then Secretary of State William P. Rogers was preparing, as he expected the country to be expelled from the United Nations. During his second visit to Beijing, Kissinger told Zhou that according to a public opinion poll 62% of Americans wanted Taiwan to remain a United Nations member and asked him to consider the "two Chinas" compromise to avoid offending American public opinion. Zhou responded with his claim that the People's Republic was the legitimate government of all China, and no compromise was possible. Kissinger said that the United States could not totally sever ties with Chiang, who had been an ally in World War II. Kissinger told Nixon that Bush was "too soft and not sophisticated" enough to properly represent the United States at the United Nations and expressed no anger when the United Nations General Assembly voted to expel Taiwan and give China's seat on the United Nations Security Council to the People's Republic.

Kissinger's trips paved the way for the groundbreaking 1972 summit between Nixon, Zhou, and Chinese Communist Party Chairman Mao Zedong, as well as the formalization of relations between the two countries, ending 23 years of diplomatic isolation and mutual hostility. The result was the formation of a tacit strategic anti-Soviet alliance between China and the United States. Kissinger's diplomacy led to economic and cultural exchanges between the two sides and the establishment of "liaison offices" in the Chinese and American capitals, though full normalization of relations with China would not occur until 1979.

=== Vietnam War ===
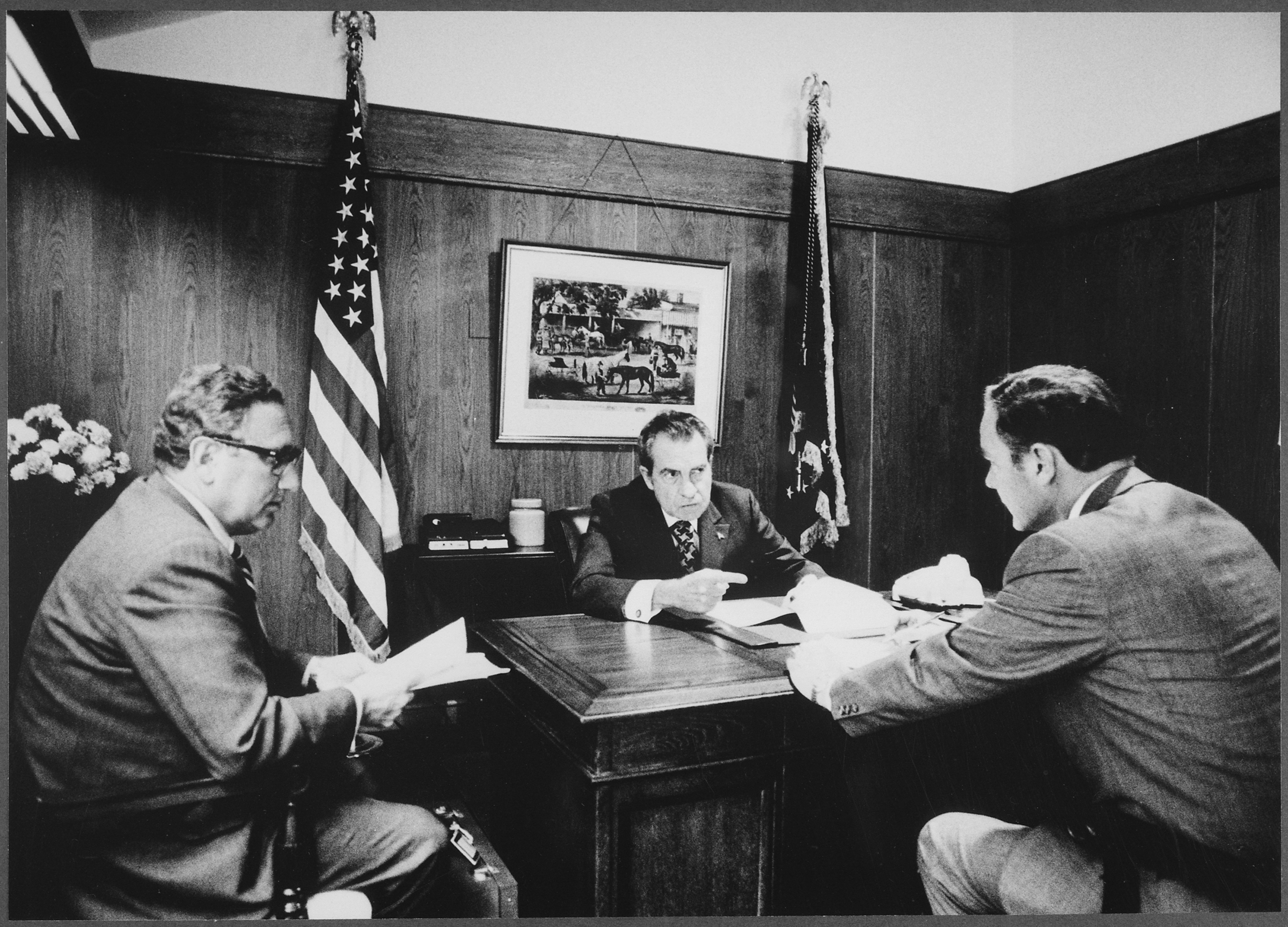
Kissinger and President Richard Nixon discussing the Vietnam situation in Camp David, 1972 (with Alexander Haig)

Kissinger discussed being involved in Indochina prior to his appointment as National Security Adviser to Nixon. According to Kissinger, his friend Henry Cabot Lodge Jr., the Ambassador to Saigon, employed Kissinger as a consultant, leading to Kissinger visiting Vietnam once in 1965 and twice in 1966, where Kissinger realized that the United States "knew neither how to win or how to conclude" the Vietnam War. Kissinger also stated that in 1967, he served as an intermediary for negotiations between the United States and North Vietnam, with Kissinger providing the American position, while two Frenchmen provided the North Vietnamese position.

When he came into office in 1969, Kissinger favored a negotiating strategy under which the United States and North Vietnam would sign an armistice and agreed to pull their troops out of South Vietnam while the South Vietnamese government and the Viet Cong were to agree to a coalition government. Kissinger had doubts about Nixon's theory of "linkage", believing that this would give the Soviet Union leverage over the United States and unlike Nixon was less concerned about the ultimate fate of South Vietnam. Though Kissinger did not regard South Vietnam as important in its own right, he believed it was necessary to support South Vietnam to maintain the United States as a global power, believing that none of America's allies would trust the United States if South Vietnam were abandoned too quickly.

In early 1969, Kissinger was opposed to the plans for Operation Menu, the bombing of Cambodia, fearing that Nixon was acting rashly with no plans for the diplomatic fall-out, but on March 16, 1969, Nixon announced the bombing would start the next day. As he saw the president was committed, he became more supportive. Kissinger played a key role in bombing Cambodia to disrupt raids into South Vietnam from Cambodia, as well as the 1970 Cambodian campaign and subsequent widespread bombing of Khmer Rouge targets in Cambodia. For his role in planning the U.S. bombing of Cambodia, scholars have stated that Kissinger bears substantial responsibility for the killing of between 50,000 and 150,000 Cambodian civilians and also the destabilization of Cambodia that the U.S. bombing campaign caused, which contributed to the Khmer Rouge's ascendance to power. The Paris peace talks had become stalemated by late 1969 owing to the obstructionism of the South Vietnamese delegation. The South Vietnamese president Nguyễn Văn Thiệu did not want the United States to withdraw from Vietnam, and out of frustration with him, Kissinger began secret peace talks with Le Duc Thọ in Paris parallel to the official talks that the South Vietnamese were unaware of. In June 1971, Kissinger supported Nixon's effort to ban the Pentagon Papers saying the "hemorrhage of state secrets" to the media was making diplomacy impossible.

On August 1, 1972, Kissinger met Thọ again in Paris, and for first time, he seemed willing to compromise, saying that political and military terms of an armistice could be treated separately and hinted that his government was no longer willing to make the overthrow of Thiệu a precondition. On the evening of October 8, 1972, at a secret meeting of Kissinger and Thọ in Paris came the decisive breakthrough in the talks. Thọ began with "a very realistic and very simple proposal" for a ceasefire that would see the Americans pull all their forces out of Vietnam in exchange for the release of all the POWs in North Vietnam. Kissinger accepted Thọ's offer as the best deal possible, saying that the "mutual withdrawal formula" had to be abandoned as it had been "unobtainable through ten years of war ... We could not make it a condition for a final settlement. We had long passed that threshold". In the fall of 1972, both Kissinger and Nixon were frustrated with Thiệu's refusal to accept any sort of peace deal calling for withdrawal of American forces. On October 21 Kissinger and the American ambassador Ellsworth Bunker arrived in Saigon to show Thiệu the peace agreement. Thiệu refused to sign the peace agreement and demanded very extensive amendments that Kissinger reported to Nixon "verge on insanity".

Though Nixon had initially supported Kissinger against Thiệu, H.R. Haldeman and John Ehrlichman urged him to reconsider, arguing that Thiệu's objections had merit. Nixon wanted 69 amendments to the draft peace agreement included in the final treaty and ordered Kissinger back to Paris to force Thọ to accept them. Kissinger regarded Nixon's 69 amendments as "preposterous" as he knew Thọ would never accept them. As expected, Thọ refused to consider any of the 69 amendments, and on December 13, 1972, left Paris for Hanoi. Kissinger by this stage was worked up into a state of fury after Thọ walked out of the Paris talks and told Nixon: "They're just a bunch of shits. Tawdry, filthy shits".

On January 8, 1973, Kissinger and Thọ met again in Paris and the next day reached an agreement, which in main points was essentially the same as the one Nixon had rejected in October with only cosmetic concessions to the Americans. Thiệu once again rejected the peace agreement, only to receive an ultimatum from Nixon which caused Thiệu to reluctantly accept the peace agreement. On January 27, 1973, Kissinger and Thọ signed a peace agreement that called for the complete withdrawal of all U.S. forces from Vietnam by March in exchange for North Vietnam freeing all the U.S. POWs. Along with Thọ, Kissinger was awarded the Nobel Peace Prize on December 10, 1973, for their work in negotiating the ceasefires contained in the Paris Peace Accords on "Ending the War and Restoring Peace in Vietnam", signed the previous January. According to Irwin Abrams in 2001, this prize was the most controversial to date. For the first time in the history of the Peace Prize, two members left the Nobel Committee in protest. Thọ rejected the award, telling Kissinger that peace had not been restored in South Vietnam. Kissinger wrote to the Nobel Committee that he accepted the award "with humility", and "donated the entire proceeds to the children of American service members killed or missing in action in Indochina". After the Fall of Saigon in 1975, Kissinger attempted to return the award.

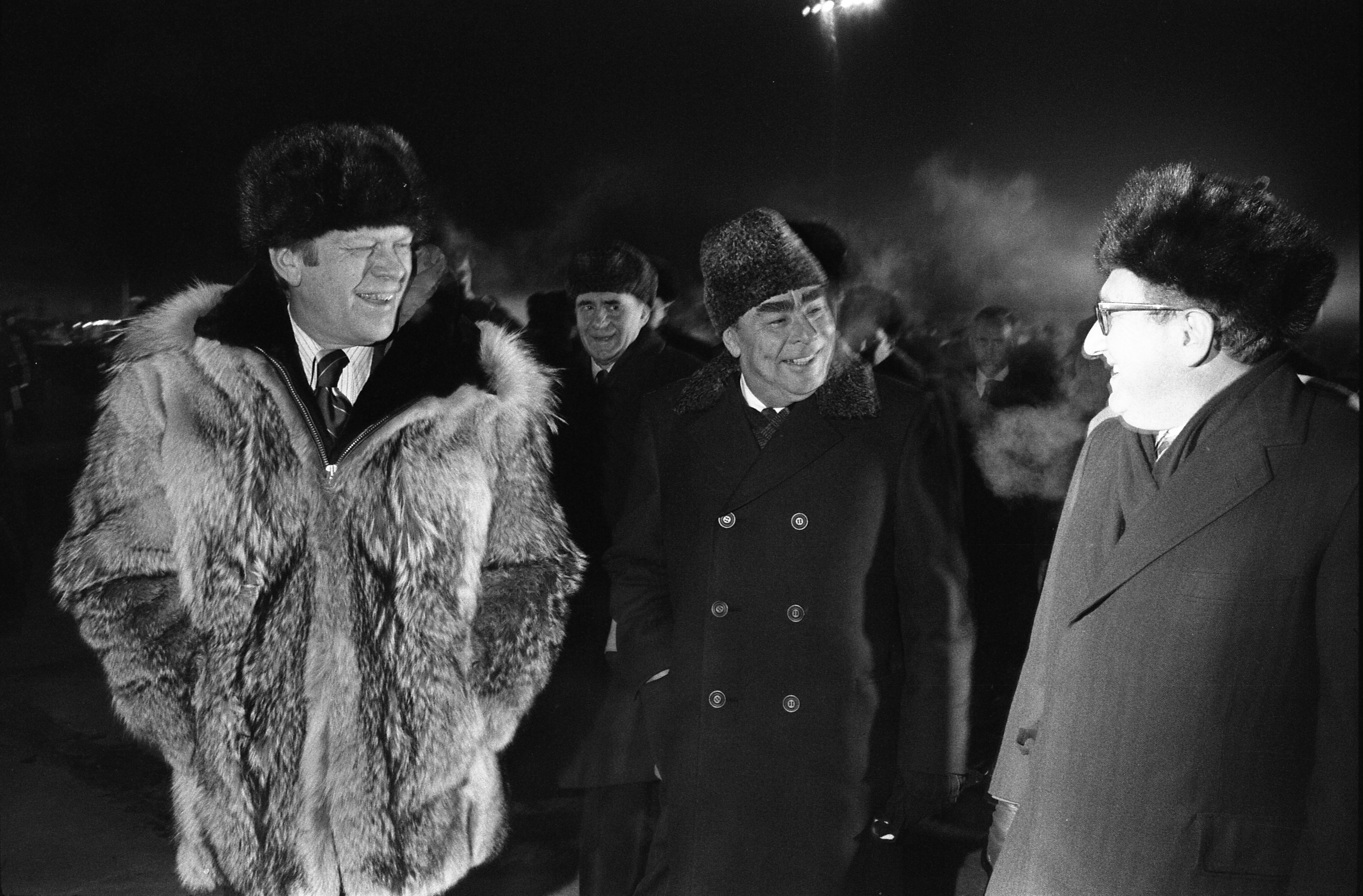
President Ford, General Secretary Leonid Brezhnev, and Kissinger speaking informally at the Vladivostok Summit in 1974

By the summer of 1974, the U.S. embassy reported that morale in the ARVN had fallen to dangerously low levels and it was uncertain how much longer South Vietnam would last. In August 1974, the U.S. Congress passed a bill limiting American aid to South Vietnam to $700 million annually. By November 1974, Kissinger lobbied Leonid Brezhnev to end Soviet military aid to North Vietnam. The same month, he also lobbied Mao Zedong and Zhou Enlai to end Chinese military aid to North Vietnam. On April 15, 1975, Kissinger testified before the Senate Appropriations Committee, urging Congress to increase the military aid budget to South Vietnam by another $700 million to save the ARVN as the PAVN was rapidly advancing on Saigon, which was refused. Kissinger maintained at the time, and until his death, that if only Congress had approved of his request for another $700 million South Vietnam would have been able to resist.

In November 1975, seven months after the Khmer Rouge took power, Kissinger told the Thai foreign minister: "You should tell the Cambodians that we will be friends with them. They are murderous thugs but we won't let that stand in our way." In a 1998 interview, Kissinger said: "some countries, the Chinese in particular supported Pol Pot as a counterweight to the Vietnamese supported people and We at least tolerated it." Kissinger said he did not approve of this due to the genocide and said he "would not have dealt with Pol Pot for any purpose whatsoever." He further said: "The Thais and the Chinese did not want a Vietnamese-dominated Indochina. We didn't want the Vietnamese to dominate. I don't believe we did anything for Pol Pot. But I suspect we closed our eyes when some others did something for Pol Pot."

==== Interview with Oriana Fallaci ====
On November 4, 1972, Kissinger agreed to an interview with Italian journalist Oriana Fallaci. Kissinger, who rarely engaged in one-on-one interviews with the press and knew very little about Fallaci, accepted her request after reportedly being impressed with her 1969 interview with Võ Nguyên Giáp. The interview turned out to be a political and public relations disaster for Kissinger as he agreed that Vietnam was a "useless war", implied that he preferred to have dinner with Lê Đức Thọ over Nguyễn Văn Thiệu (in her 1976 book Interview with History, Fallaci recalled that Kissinger agreed with many of her negative sentiments towards Thiệu in a private discussion before the interview), and engaged in a now infamous exchange with the hard-pressing Fallaci, with Kissinger comparing himself to a cowboy leading the Nixon administration:

Fallaci: "I suppose that at the root of everything there's your success. I mean, like a chess player, you've made two or three good moves. China, first of all. People like chess players who checkmate the king."
Kissinger: "Yes, China has been a very important element in the mechanics of my success. And yet that's not the main point. The main point. ... Well, yes, I'll tell you. What do I care? The main point arises from the fact that I've always acted alone. Americans like that immensely. Americans like the cowboy who leads the wagon train by riding ahead alone on his horse, the cowboy who rides all alone into the town, the village, with his horse and nothing else. Maybe even without a pistol, since he doesn't shoot. He acts, that's all, by being in the right place at the right time. In short, a Western."
Fallaci: "I see. You see yourself as a kind of Henry Fonda, unarmed and ready to fight with his fists for honest ideals. Alone, courageous ..."
Kissinger: "Not necessarily courageous. In fact, this cowboy doesn't have to be courageous. All he needs is to be alone, to show others that he rides into the town and does everything by himself. This amazing, romantic character suits me precisely because to be alone has always been part of my style or, if you like, my technique. Together with independence. Oh, that's very important in me and for me. And finally, conviction. I've always been convinced that I had to do whatever I've done. And people feel it, and believe in it. And I care about the fact that they believe in me when you sway or convince somebody, you shouldn't confuse them. Nor can you even simply calculate. Some people think that I carefully plan what are to be the consequences, for the public, of any of my initiatives or efforts. They think this preoccupation is always on my mind. Instead the consequences of what I do, I mean the public's judgment, have never bothered me. I don't ask for popularity, I'm not looking for popularity. On the contrary, if you really want to know, I care nothing about popularity. I'm not at all afraid of losing my public; I can allow myself to say what I think. I'm referring to what's genuine in me. If I were to let myself be disturbed by the reactions of the public, if I were to act solely on the basis of a calculated technique, I would accomplish nothing."

Nixon was enraged by the interview, in particular the comedic "cowboy" comparison which infuriated Nixon. For several weeks afterwards, he refused to see Kissinger and even contemplated firing him. At one point, Kissinger, in desperation, drove up unannounced to Nixon's San Clemente residence but was rejected by Secret Service personnel at the gates. Kissinger later claimed that it was "the single most disastrous conversation I have ever had with any member of the press". Fallaci described the interview with the evasive, monotonous, non-expressive Kissinger as the most uncomfortable and most difficult she ever did, criticizing Kissinger as a "intellectual adventurer" and a self-styled Metternich.

=== Bangladesh Liberation War ===
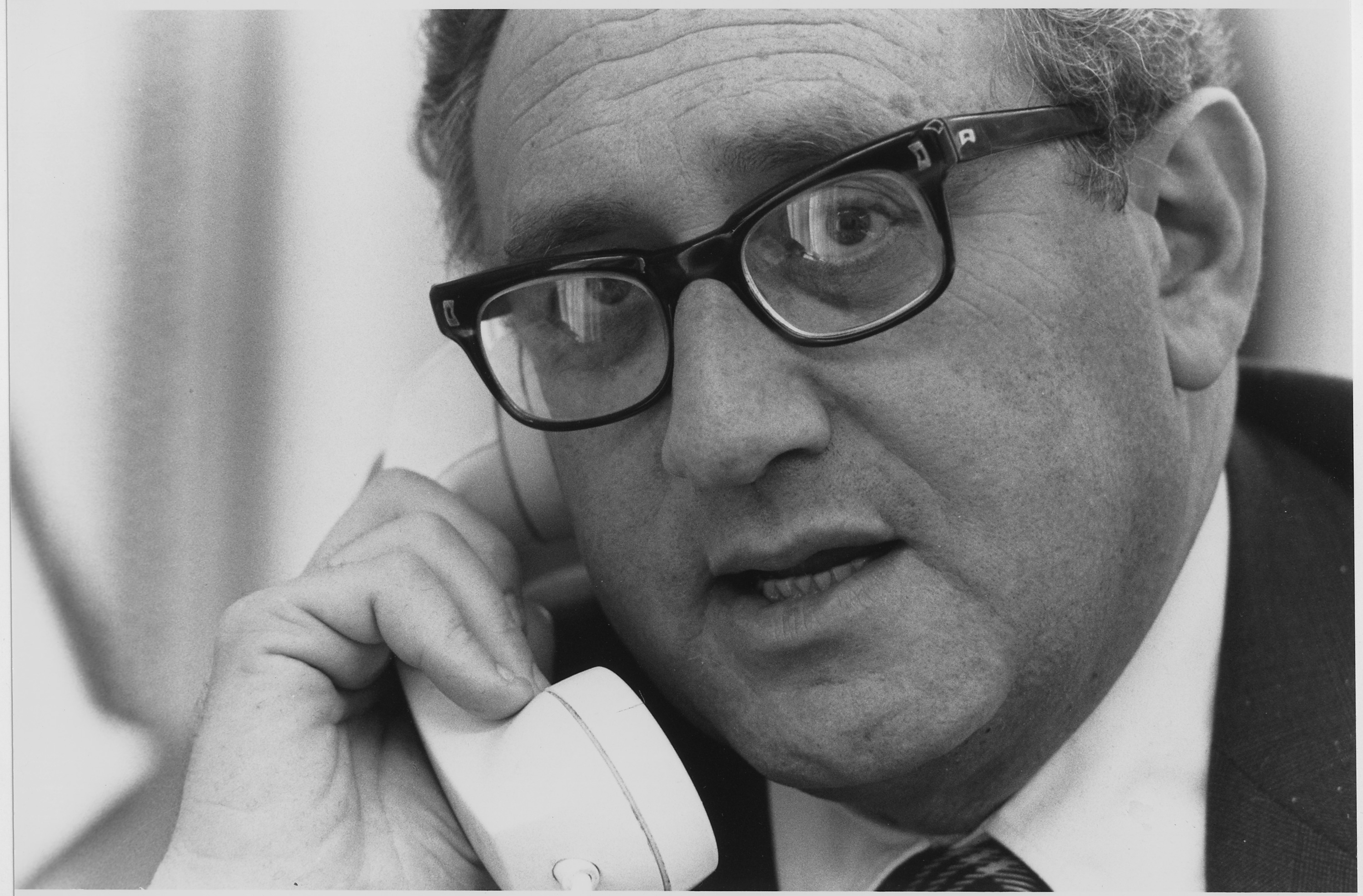
Kissinger in the West Wing as National Security Adviser in April 1975

Nixon supported Pakistani dictator Yahya Khan in the Bangladesh Liberation War in 1971. Kissinger sneered at people who "bleed" for "the dying Bengalis" and ignored the first telegram from the U.S. consul general in East Pakistan, Archer K. Blood, and 20 members of his staff, which informed the U.S. that their allies West Pakistan were undertaking, in Blood's words, "a selective genocide" targeting the Bengali intelligentsia, supporters of independence for East Pakistan, and the Hindu minority. In the second, more famous, Blood Telegram the word 'genocide' was again used to describe the events, and further that with its continuing support for West Pakistan the U.S. government had "evidenced ... moral bankruptcy". As a direct response to the dissent against U.S. policy, Kissinger and Nixon ended Archer Blood's tenure as United States consul general in East Pakistan and put him to work in the State Department's Personnel Office. Christopher Clary argues that Nixon and Kissinger were unconsciously biased, leading them to overestimate the likelihood of Pakistani victory against Bengali rebels.

Kissinger was particularly concerned about the expansion of Soviet influence in the Indian subcontinent as a result of a treaty of friendship recently signed by India and the Soviet Union, and sought to demonstrate to China (Pakistan's ally and an enemy of both India and the Soviet Union) the value of a tacit alliance with the United States.

Kissinger had also come under fire for private comments he made to Nixon during the Bangladesh–Pakistan War in which he described Indian prime minister Indira Gandhi as a "bitch" and a "witch". He also said "the Indians are bastards", shortly before the war. Kissinger later expressed his regret over the comments.

=== Europe ===
As National Security Adviser under Nixon, Kissinger pioneered the policy of détente with the Soviet Union, seeking a relaxation in tensions between the two superpowers. As a part of this strategy, he negotiated the Strategic Arms Limitation Talks (culminating in the SALT I treaty) and the Anti-Ballistic Missile Treaty with Leonid Brezhnev, General Secretary of the Soviet Communist Party. Negotiations about strategic disarmament were originally supposed to start under the Lyndon Johnson administration but were postponed in protest upon the invasion by Warsaw Pact troops of Czechoslovakia in August 1968.

Nixon felt his administration had neglected relations with the Western European states in his first term and in September 1972 decided that if he was reelected that 1973 would be the "Year of Europe" as the United States would focus on relations with the states of the European Economic Community (EEC) which had emerged as a serious economic rival by 1970. Applying his favorite "linkage" concept, Nixon intended henceforward economic relations with Europe would not be severed from security relations, and if the EEC states wanted changes in American tariff and monetary policies, the price would be defense spending on their part. Kissinger in particular as part of the "Year of Europe" wanted to "revitalize" NATO, which he called a "decaying" alliance as he believed that there was nothing at present to stop the Red Army from overrunning Western Europe in a conventional forces conflict. The "linkage" concept more applied to the question of security as Kissinger noted that the United States was going to sacrifice NATO for the sake of "citrus fruits".

=== Israeli policy and Soviet Jewry ===
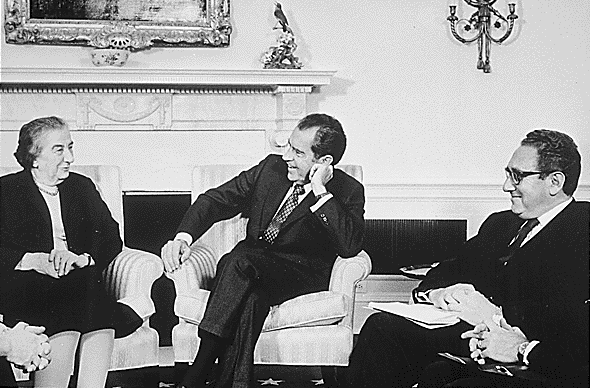
Kissinger sits in the Oval Office with President Nixon and Israeli prime minister Golda Meir, 1973.

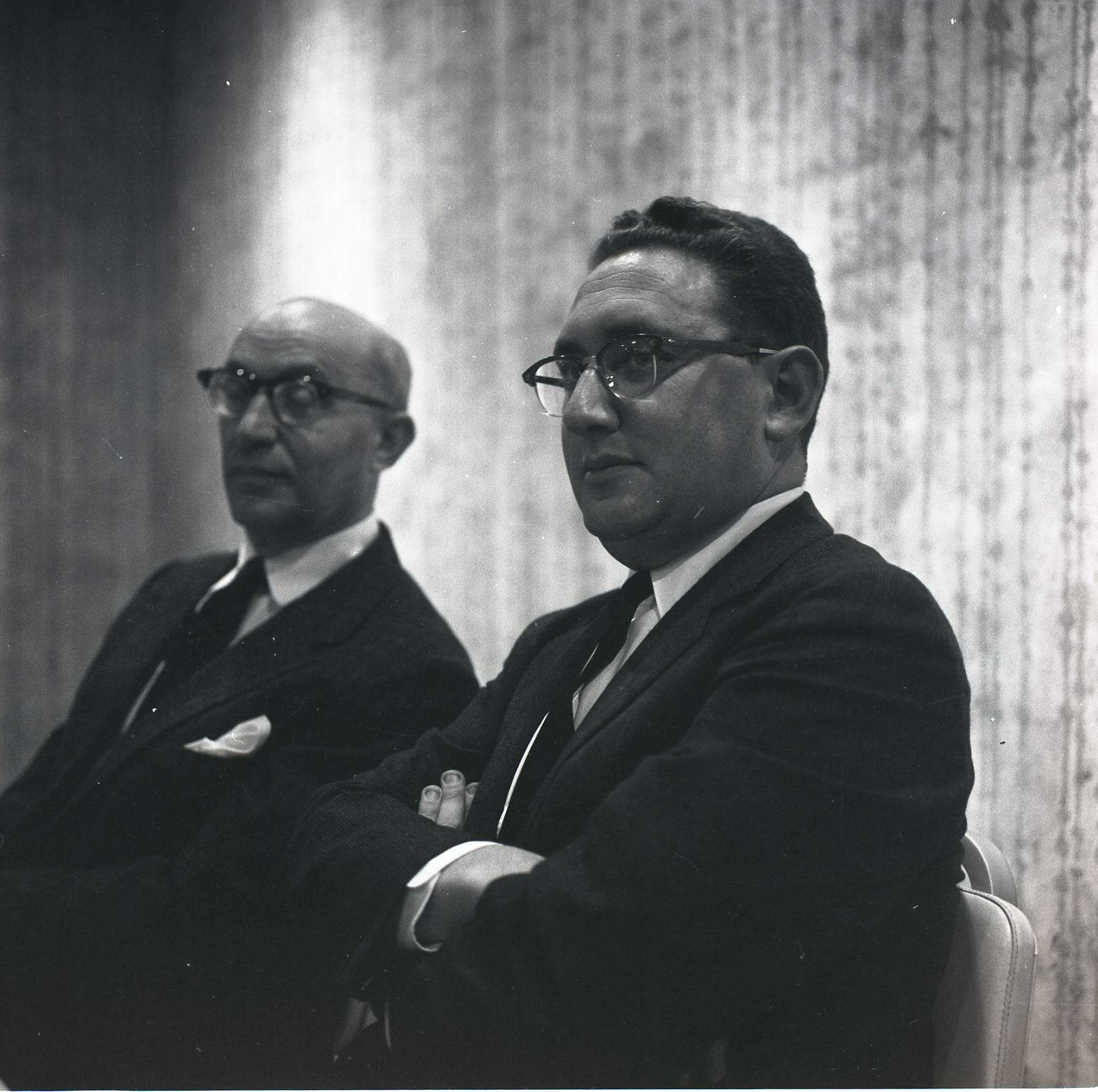
Kissinger (right) during a 1961 visit to Israel

According to notes taken by H. R. Haldeman, Nixon "ordered his aides to exclude all Jewish-Americans from policy-making on Israel", including Kissinger. One note quotes Nixon as saying "get K. [Kissinger] out of the play—Haig handle it".

In 1973, Kissinger did not feel that pressing the Soviet Union concerning the plight of Jews being persecuted there was in the interest of U.S. foreign policy. In a conversation with Nixon shortly after a meeting with Israeli prime minister Golda Meir on March 1, 1973, Kissinger stated, "The emigration of Jews from the Soviet Union is not an objective of American foreign policy, and if they put Jews into gas chambers in the Soviet Union, it is not an American concern. Maybe a humanitarian concern." He had a negative view of American Jews who lobbied for aid to Soviet Jews, calling them "bastards" and "self-serving". He went on to state that, "If it were not for the accident of my birth, I would be antisemitic" and "any people who has been persecuted for two thousand years must be doing something wrong."

=== Arab–Israeli conflict ===
In September 1973, Nixon fired William P. Rogers as Secretary of State and replaced him with Kissinger. He would later state he had not been given enough time to know the Middle East as he settled into the State Department. Kissinger later admitted that he was so engrossed with the Paris peace talks to end the Vietnam war that he and others in Washington missed the significance of the Egyptian-Saudi alliance. Egyptian president Anwar Sadat expelled Soviet advisors from Egypt in May 1972, attempting to signal to the U.S. that he was open to disentangling Egypt from the Soviet sphere of influence; Kissinger offered secret talks on a settlement for the Middle East, though nothing came of the offer. By March 1973, Sadat had moved back towards the Soviets, closing the largest arms package between Egypt and the Soviet Union and allowing for the return of Soviet military personnel and advisors to Egypt.

On October 6, 1973, at 6:15 am, assistant secretary for Near Eastern affairs Joseph Sisco, informed Kissinger that Egypt and Syria were about to go to war with Israel. Sisco had been warned by U.S. ambassador to Israel, Kenneth Keating, who two hours previously had been urgently summoned by Israel's Prime Minister Golda Meir who believed conflict was imminent. Prioritising détente, Kissinger's first phone call (at 6:40 am) was to Soviet ambassador and good friend Anatoly Dobrynin. He would later make calls to British ambassador Rowland Baring and the U.N. secretary-general Kurt Waldheim. Kissinger did not inform President Richard Nixon or White House chief of staff Alexander Haig about the start of the Yom Kippur War until either 8:35 or 9:25 am. as both were spending the weekend at Key Biscayne discussing Spiro Agnew's imminent resignation. According to Kissinger his urgent calls to the Soviets and Egyptians were ineffective.

On October 12, under Nixon's direction, and against Kissinger's initial advice, while Kissinger was on his way to Moscow to discuss conditions for a cease-fire, Nixon sent a message to Brezhnev giving Kissinger full negotiating authority. Kissinger wanted to stall a ceasefire to gain more time for Israel to push across the Suez Canal to the African side, and wanted to be perceived as a mere presidential emissary who needed to consult the White House all the time as a stalling tactic.

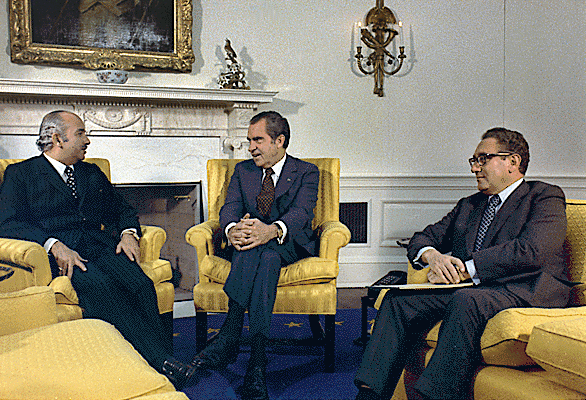
On October 31, 1973, Egyptian foreign minister Ismail Fahmi (left) meets with Richard Nixon (middle) and Henry Kissinger (right), about a week after the end of fighting in the Yom Kippur War.

Kissinger promised the Israeli prime minister Golda Meir that the United States would replace its losses in equipment after the war, but sought initially to delay arms shipments to Israel, as he believed it would improve the odds of making peace along the lines of United Nations Security Council Resolution 242. In 1973, Meir requested $850 million worth of American arms and equipment to replace its materiel losses. Nixon instead sent some $2 billion worth. The arms lift enraged King Faisal of Saudi Arabia, and he retaliated on October 20, 1973, by placing a total embargo on oil shipments to the United States, to be joined by all of the other oil-producing Arab states except Iraq and Libya.

On November 7, 1973, Kissinger flew to Riyadh to meet King Faisal and to ask him to end the oil embargo in exchange for promising to be "even handed" in the Arab-Israeli dispute. Despite Kissinger's efforts to charm him, Faisal refused to lift the oil embargo. Only on March 19, 1974, did the King end the oil embargo, after Sadat reported to him that the United States was being more "even handed" and after Kissinger had promised to sell Saudi Arabia weapons that it had previously denied under the grounds that they might be used against Israel.

Kissinger pressured the Israelis to cede some of the newly captured land back to its Arab neighbors, contributing to the first phases of Israeli–Egyptian non-aggression. In 1973–1974, Kissinger engaged in "shuttle diplomacy" flying between Tel Aviv, Cairo, and Damascus in a bid to make the armistice the basis of a permanent peace. Kissinger's first meeting with Hafez al-Assad lasted 6 hours and 30 minutes, causing the press to believe for a moment that he had been kidnapped by the Syrians. In his memoirs, Kissinger described how, during the course of his 28 meetings in Damascus in 1973–74, Assad "negotiated tenaciously and daringly like a riverboat gambler to make sure he had exacted the last sliver of available concessions". As for the others Kissinger negotiated with, Kissinger viewed the Israeli politicians as rigid, while he had a good relationship and was able to develop a sense of assurance with Sadat. Kissinger's efforts resulted in two ceasefires between Egypt and Israel, Sinai I in January 1974, and Sinai II in September 1975.

Kissinger had avoided involving France and the United Kingdom, the former European colonial powers of the Middle East, in the peace negotiations that followed the Yom Kippur War, being primarily focused on minimizing the Soviet Union's sway over the peace negotiations and on moderating the international influences on the Arab-Israeli conflict. President Pompidou of France was concerned and perturbed by this development, viewing it as an indication of the United States' ambitions of hegemonically domineering the region.

=== Persian Gulf ===
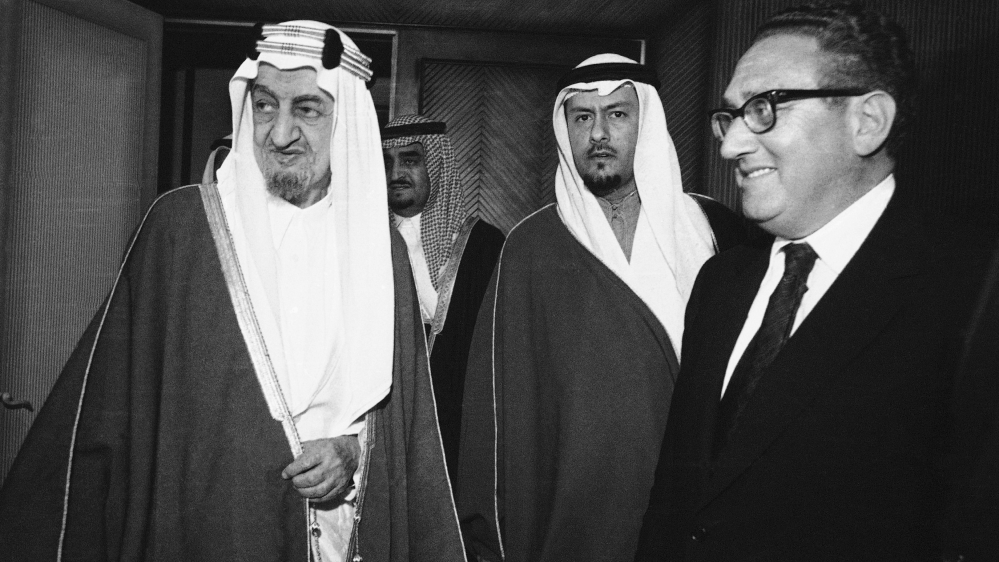
Kissinger and King Faisal of Saudi Arabia (left) in Riyadh on March 19, 1975. In the far background behind Faisal is his half-brother, the future King Fahd.

A major concern for Kissinger was the possibility of Soviet influence in the Persian Gulf. In April 1969, Iraq came into conflict with Iran when Shah Mohammad Reza Pahlavi renounced the 1937 treaty governing the Shatt-al-Arab river. On December 1, 1971, after two years of skirmishes along the border, President Ahmed Hassan al-Bakr broke off diplomatic relations with Iran. In May 1972, Nixon and Kissinger visited Tehran to tell the Shah that there would be no "second-guessing of his requests" to buy American weapons. At the same time, Nixon and Kissinger agreed to a plan of the Shah's that the United States together with Iran and Israel would support the Kurdish peshmerga guerrillas fighting for independence from Iraq. Kissinger later wrote that after Vietnam, there was no possibility of deploying American forces in the Middle East, and henceforward Iran was to act as America's surrogate in the Persian Gulf. Kissinger described the Ba'athist regime in Iraq as a potential threat to the United States and believed that building up Iran and supporting the peshmerga was the best counterweight.

=== Turkish invasion of Cyprus ===
Following a period of steady relations between the U.S. Government and the Greek military regime after 1967, Secretary of State Kissinger was faced with the coup by the Greek junta and the Turkish invasion of Cyprus in July and August 1974. In an August 1974 edition of The New York Times, it was revealed that Kissinger and the State Department were informed in advance of the impending coup by the Greek junta in Cyprus. Indeed, according to the journalist, the official version of events as told by the State Department was that it felt it had to warn the Greek military regime not to carry out the coup.

Kissinger was a target of anti-American sentiment which was a significant feature of Greek public opinion at the time—particularly among young people—viewing the U.S. role in Cyprus as negative. In a demonstration by students in Heraklion, Crete, soon after the second phase of the Turkish invasion in August 1974, slogans such as "Kissinger, murderer", "Americans get out", "No to Partition" and "Cyprus is no Vietnam" were heard. Some years later, Kissinger expressed the opinion that the Cyprus issue was resolved in 1974. The New York Times and other major newspapers were highly critical, and even State Department officials did not hide their dissatisfaction with his alleged arrogance and ignorance of the basic facts of the issue.

Kissinger was reported to have said, "The Turkish tactics are right – grab what they want and then negotiate on the basis of possession".

However, Kissinger never felt comfortable with the way he handled the Cyprus issue. Journalist Alexis Papahelas stated that Kissinger's "facial expression changes markedly when someone—usually Greek or Cypriot—refers to the crisis". According to him, Kissinger had felt since the summer of 1974 that history would not treat him lightly in relation to his actions.

=== Latin American policy ===
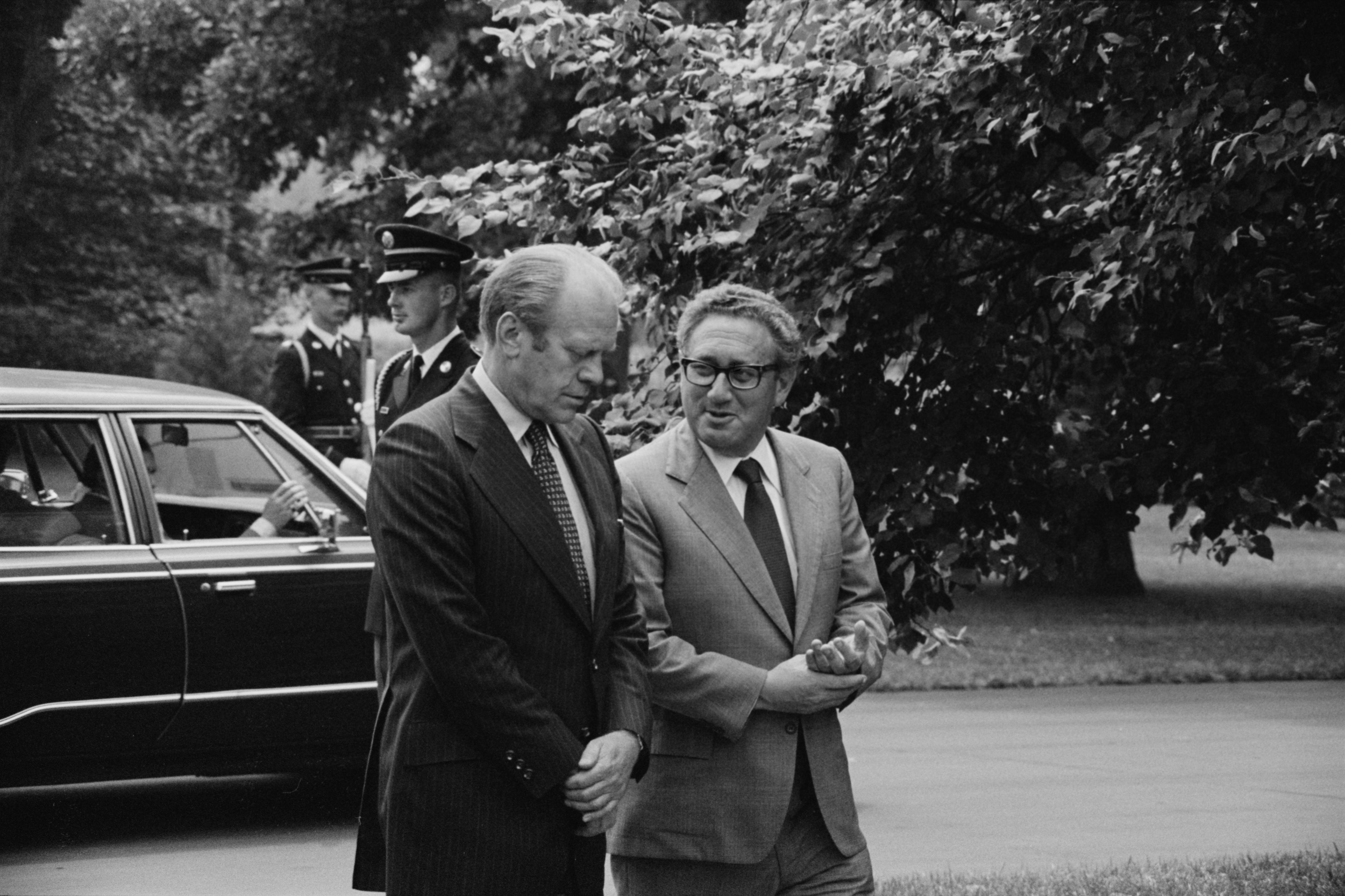
Ford and Kissinger conversing on the White House grounds, August 1974

In 1970, Kissinger parroted to Nixon the United States Department of Defense's position that the country should maintain control over the Panama Canal, which was a reversal of the commitment by the Lyndon Johnson administration. Later, in the face of international pressure, Kissinger changed his stance, viewing the past hardline position in the Panama Canal issue as a hindrance to American relations with Latin America and an international setback that the Soviet Union would approve of. Kissinger in 1973 called for "new dialogue" between the United States and Latin America, then in 1974, Kissinger met Panama military leader Omar Torrijos and an agreement on eight operating principles for an eventual handover of the Panama Canal to Panama was made between Kissinger and Panamanian foreign minister Juan Antonio Tack, which angered the United States Congress, but ultimately provided a framework for the 1977 U.S.–Panama treaties.

==== Cuba ====
Kissinger initially supported the normalization of United States–Cuba relations, broken since 1961 (all U.S.–Cuban trade was blocked in February 1962, a few weeks after the exclusion of Cuba from the Organization of American States because of U.S. pressure). However, he quickly changed his mind and followed Kennedy's policy. After the involvement of the Cuban Revolutionary Armed Forces in the independence struggles in Angola and Mozambique, Kissinger said that unless Cuba withdrew its forces relations would not be normalized. Cuba refused.

During the 1970 Cienfuegos Crisis, in which the Soviet Navy was strongly suspected of building a submarine base in the Cuban city of Cienfuegos, Kissinger met with Anatoly Dobrynin, Soviet Ambassador to the United States, informing him that the United States government considered this act a violation of the agreements made in 1962 by President John F. Kennedy and Premier Nikita Khrushchev in the wake of the Cuban Missile Crisis, prompting the Soviets to halt construction of their planned base in Cienfuegos.

In February 1976, Kissinger considered launching air strikes against ports and military installations in Cuba, as well as deploying U.S. Marine Corps battalions based at the U.S. Navy base at Guantanamo Bay, in retaliation for Cuban president Fidel Castro's decision in late 1975 to send troops to newly independent Angola to help the MPLA in its fight against UNITA and South Africa during the start of the Angolan Civil War.

==== Intervention in Bolivia ====
Following the uprising of October 7, 1970, General Juan José Torres came to power in Bolivia, forming a left-wing nationalist government with an "anti-imperialist" stance. His policies, which included the nationalization of some American-owned property, led to the U.S. exerting external pressure over his government.

On June 11, 1971, Nixon and Kissinger discussed the possibility of supporting a coup in Bolivia, and later in July, the 40 Committee approved covert funding towards Torres's opposition. Torres was successfully overthrown by the Nationalist Popular Front, led by Hugo Banzer, on August 21, 1971.

==== Intervention in Chile ====
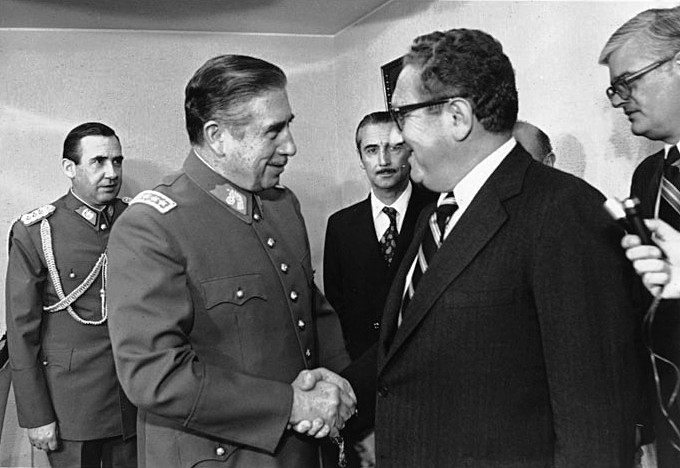
Augusto Pinochet shaking hands with Kissinger in 1976

Chilean Socialist Party presidential candidate Salvador Allende was elected in 1970, causing serious concern in Washington, D.C., due to his socialist and pro-Cuban politics. The Nixon administration, with Kissinger's input, authorized the Central Intelligence Agency (CIA) to encourage a military coup that would prevent Allende's inauguration, but the plan was not successful. Prior to Allende's election Kissinger had said that "I don't see why we need to stand by and watch a country go Communist because of the irresponsibility of its own people".

On September 11, 1973, Allende died during an army attack on the presidential palace that was an element of a military coup launched by Army Commander-in-Chief Augusto Pinochet, who then became the head of the military junta which replaced Allende. In September 1976, Orlando Letelier, a Chilean opponent of the new Pinochet regime, was assassinated in Washington, D.C., with a car bomb. Previously, Kissinger had helped secure his release from prison, and had chosen to cancel an official U.S. letter to Chile warning them against carrying out any political assassinations. This murder was part of Operation Condor, a covert program of political repression and assassination carried out by Southern Cone nations that Kissinger has been accused of being involved in.

On September 10, 2001, after recent declassification of documents, relatives and survivors of General René Schneider filed civil proceedings against Kissinger, in federal court in Washington, D.C., accusing him of collaborating in arranging Schneider's kidnapping which resulted in his death. The case was later dismissed by the U.S. District Court for the District of Columbia, citing separation of powers: "The decision to support a coup of the Chilean government to prevent Dr. Allende from coming to power, and the means by which the United States Government sought to effect that goal, implicate policy makers in the murky realm of foreign affairs and national security best left to the political branches." Decades later, the CIA admitted its involvement in the kidnapping of General Schneider, but not his murder, and subsequently paid the group responsible for his death $35,000 "to keep the prior contact secret, maintain the goodwill of the group, and for humanitarian reasons".

==== Argentina ====
Kissinger took a similar line as he had toward Chile when the Argentine Armed Forces, led by Jorge Videla, toppled the elected government of Isabel Perón in 1976 with a process called the National Reorganization Process by the military, with which they consolidated power, launching brutal reprisals and "disappearances" against political opponents. An October 1987 investigative report in The Nation broke the story of how, in a June 1976 meeting in the Hotel Carrera in Santiago, Kissinger gave the military junta in neighboring Argentina the "green light" for their own clandestine repression against leftwing guerrillas and other dissidents, thousands of whom were kept in more than 400 secret concentration camps before they were executed. During a meeting with Argentine foreign minister César Augusto Guzzetti, Kissinger assured him that the United States was an ally but urged him to "get back to normal procedures" quickly before the U.S. Congress reconvened and had a chance to consider sanctions.

As the article published in The Nation noted, as the state-sponsored terror mounted, conservative Republican U.S. Ambassador to Buenos Aires Robert C. Hill "'was shaken, he became very disturbed, by the case of the son of a thirty-year embassy employee, a student who was arrested, never to be seen again,' recalled Juan de Onis, former reporter for The New York Times. 'Hill took a personal interest.' He went to the Interior Minister, a general with whom he had worked on drug cases, saying, 'Hey, what about this? We're interested in this case.' He questioned (Foreign Minister Cesar) Guzzetti and, finally, President Jorge Videla himself. 'All he got was stonewalling; he got nowhere.' de Onis said. 'His last year was marked by increasing disillusionment and dismay, and he backed his staff on human rights right to the hilt."

In a letter to The Nation editor Victor Navasky, protesting publication of the article, Kissinger claimed that: "At any rate, the notion of Hill as a passionate human rights advocate is news to all his former associates." Yet Kissinger aide Harry W. Shlaudeman later disagreed with Kissinger, telling the oral historian William E. Knight of the Association for Diplomatic Studies and Training Foreign Affairs Oral History Project:

It really came to a head when I was Assistant Secretary, or it began to come to a head, in the case of Argentina where the dirty war was in full flower. Bob Hill, who was Ambassador then in Buenos Aires, a very conservative Republican politician—by no means liberal or anything of the kind, began to report quite effectively about what was going on, this slaughter of innocent civilians, supposedly innocent civilians—this vicious war that they were conducting, underground war. He, at one time in fact, sent me a back-channel telegram saying that the Foreign Minister, who had just come for a visit to Washington and had returned to Buenos Aires, had gloated to him that Kissinger had said nothing to him about human rights. I don't know—I wasn't present at the interview.

Navasky later wrote in his book about being confronted by Kissinger:

'Tell me, Mr. Navasky,' [Kissinger] said in his famous guttural tones, 'how is it that a short article in an obscure journal such as yours about a conversation that was supposed to have taken place years ago about something that did or didn't happen in Argentina resulted in sixty people holding placards denouncing me a few months ago at the airport when I got off the plane in Copenhagen?'

According to declassified state department files, Kissinger also hindered the Carter administration's efforts to halt the mass killings by the 1976–1983 military dictatorship by visiting the country as Videla's personal guest to attend the 1978 FIFA World Cup and praising the regime.

==== Brazil's nuclear weapons program ====
Kissinger was in favor of accommodating Brazil while it pursued a nuclear weapons program in the 1970s. Kissinger justified his position by arguing that Brazil was a U.S. ally and on the grounds that it would benefit private nuclear industry actors in the U.S. Kissinger's position on Brazil was out of sync with influential voices in the U.S. Congress, the State Department, and the U.S. Arms Control and Disarmament Agency.

=== Rhodesia ===
In September 1976, Kissinger was actively involved in negotiations regarding the Rhodesian Bush War. Kissinger, along with South Africa's prime minister John Vorster, pressured Rhodesian prime minister Ian Smith to hasten the transition to black majority rule in Rhodesia. With FRELIMO in control of Mozambique and even the apartheid regime of South Africa reducing its support, Rhodesia's isolation was nearly complete. According to Smith's autobiography, Kissinger told Smith of Mrs. Kissinger's admiration for him, but Smith stated that he thought Kissinger was asking him to sign Rhodesia's "death certificate". Kissinger, bringing the weight of the United States, and corralling other relevant parties to put pressure on Rhodesia, hastened the end of white minority rule.

=== Portuguese Empire ===
In contrast to the unfriendly disposition of the previous Kennedy and Johnson administrations towards the Estado Novo regime of Portugal, particularly with regards to its attempts to maintain the Portuguese Colonial Empire by waging the Portuguese Colonial War against anti-colonial rebellions in defense of its empire, the Department of State under Kissinger adopted a more conciliatory attitude towards Portugal. In 1971, the administration of President Nixon successfully renewed the lease of the American military base in the Azores, despite condemnation from the Congressional Black Caucus and some members of the Senate. Though privately continuing to view Portugal contemptibly for its perceived atavistic foreign policy towards Africa, Kissinger publicly expressed thanks for Portugal's agreement to use its military base in Lajes in the Azores to resupply Israel in the Yom Kippur War. Following the fall of the far-right Portuguese regime in 1974, Kissinger worried that the new government's hasty decolonization plan might benefit radical factions such as the MPLA in Angola. He also expressed concern that the inclusion of the Portuguese Communist Party in the new Portuguese government could legitimize communist parties in other NATO member states, such as Italy.

=== East Timor ===
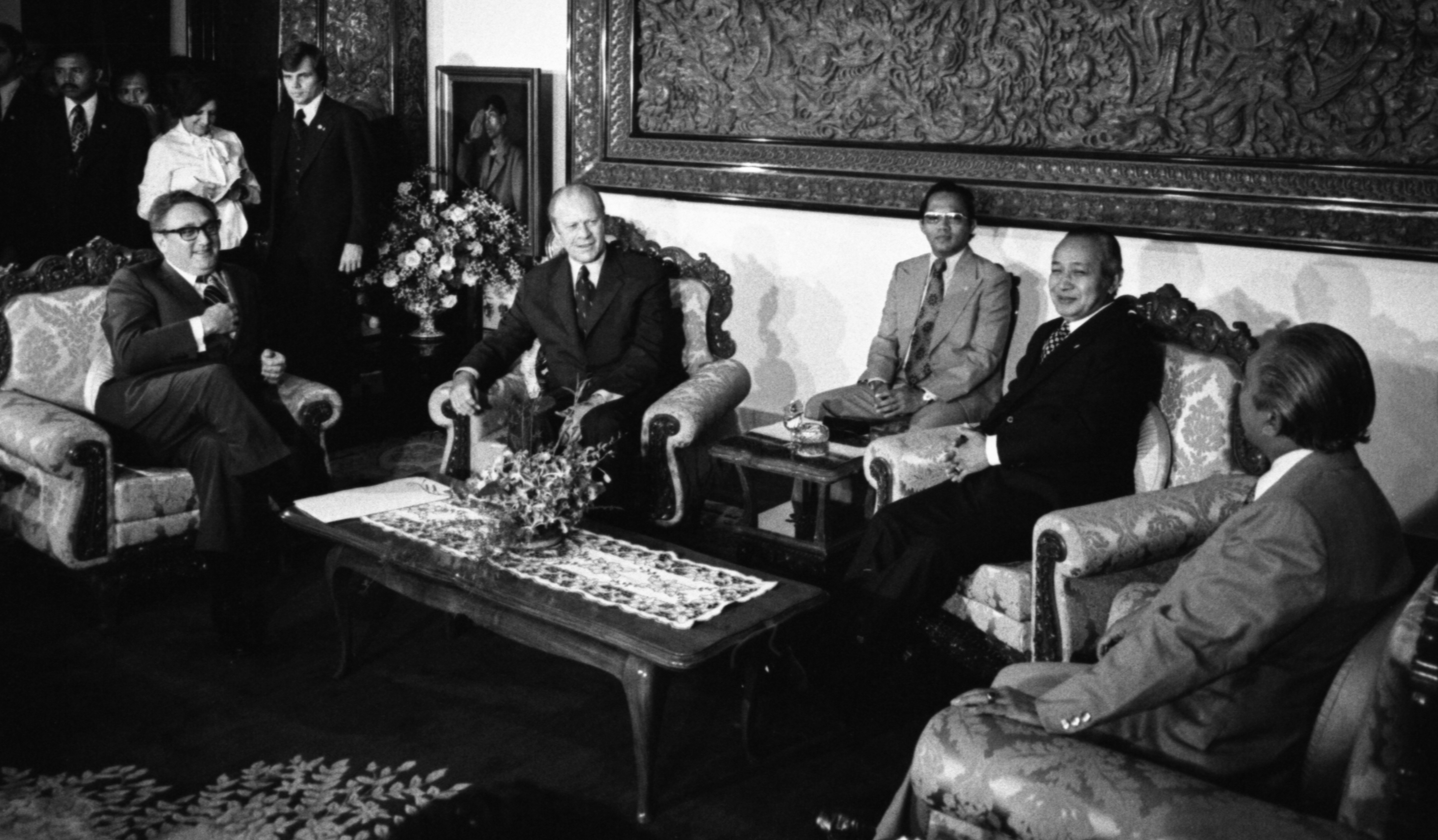
Suharto with Gerald Ford and Kissinger in Jakarta on December 6, 1975, one day before the Indonesian invasion of East Timor

The Portuguese decolonization process brought U.S. attention to the former Portuguese colony of East Timor, which declared its independence in 1975. Indonesian president Suharto regarded East Timor as rightfully part of Indonesia. In December 1975, Suharto discussed invasion plans during a meeting with Kissinger and President Ford in the Indonesian capital of Jakarta. Both Ford and Kissinger made clear that U.S. relations with Indonesia would remain strong and that it would not object to the proposed annexation. They only wanted it done "fast" and proposed that it be delayed until after they had returned to Washington. Accordingly, Suharto delayed the operation for one day. Finally on December 7, Indonesian forces invaded the former Portuguese colony. U.S. arms sales to Indonesia continued, and Suharto went ahead with the annexation plan. According to Ben Kiernan, the invasion and occupation resulted in the deaths of nearly a quarter of the Timorese population from 1975 to 1981.

=== Western Sahara ===
The Kissingerian doctrine endorsed the forced concession of Spanish Sahara to Morocco. At the height of the 1975 Sahara crisis, Kissinger misled Gerald Ford into thinking the International Court of Justice had ruled in favor of Morocco. Kissinger was aware in advance of the Moroccan plans for the invasion of the territory, materialized on November 6, 1975, in the so-called Green March.

=== Zaire ===
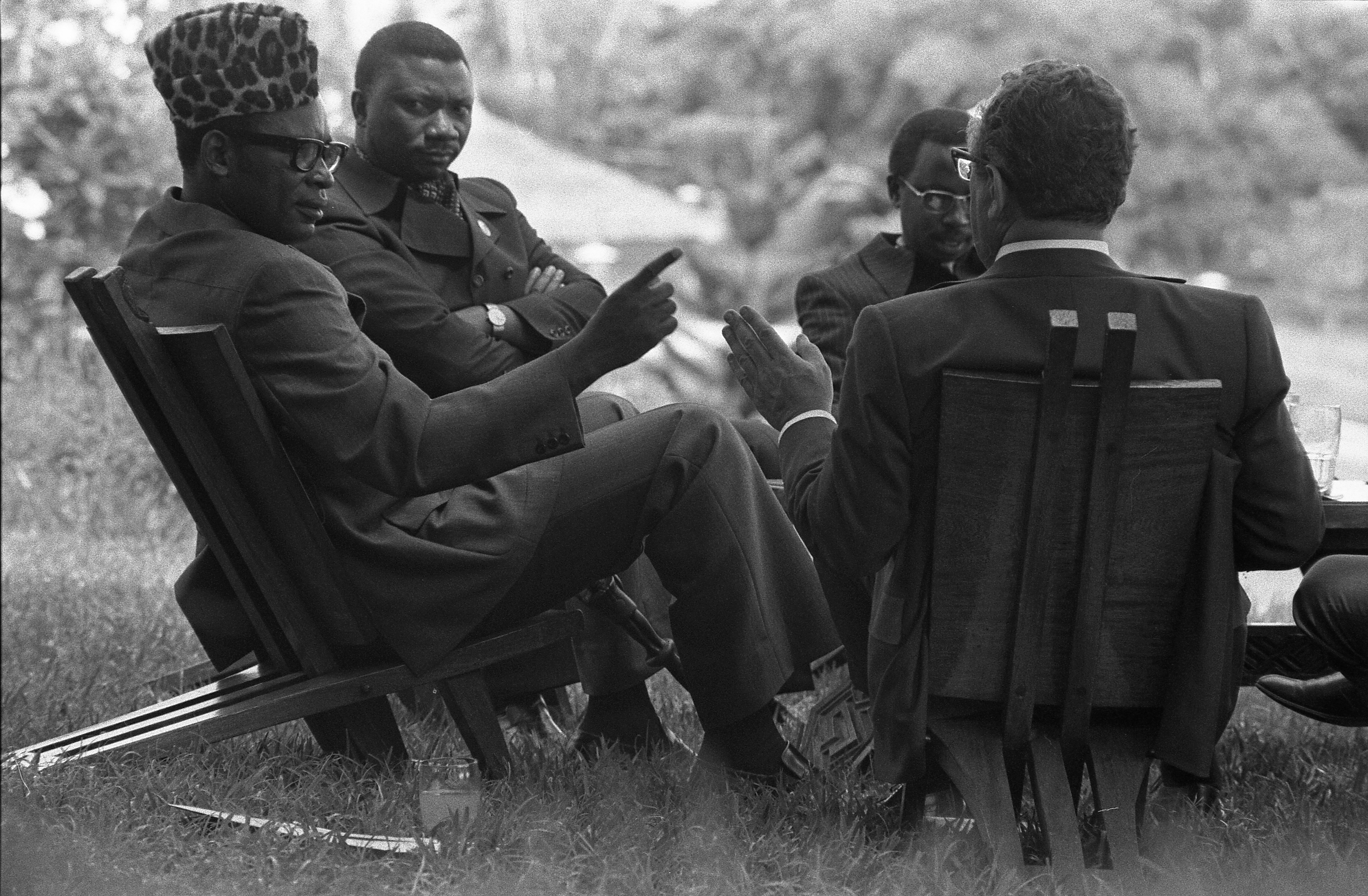
Henry Kissinger meeting with President Mobutu Sese Seko and others at the Presidential Residence in Kinshasa, Zaire

Kissinger was involved in furthering cooperation between the U.S. and the Zairian dictator Mobutu Sese Seko and held multiple meetings with him. Kissinger later described these efforts as "one of our policy successes in Africa" and praised Mobutu as "courageous, politically astute" and "relatively honest in a country where governmental corruption is a way of life".

== Later roles ==
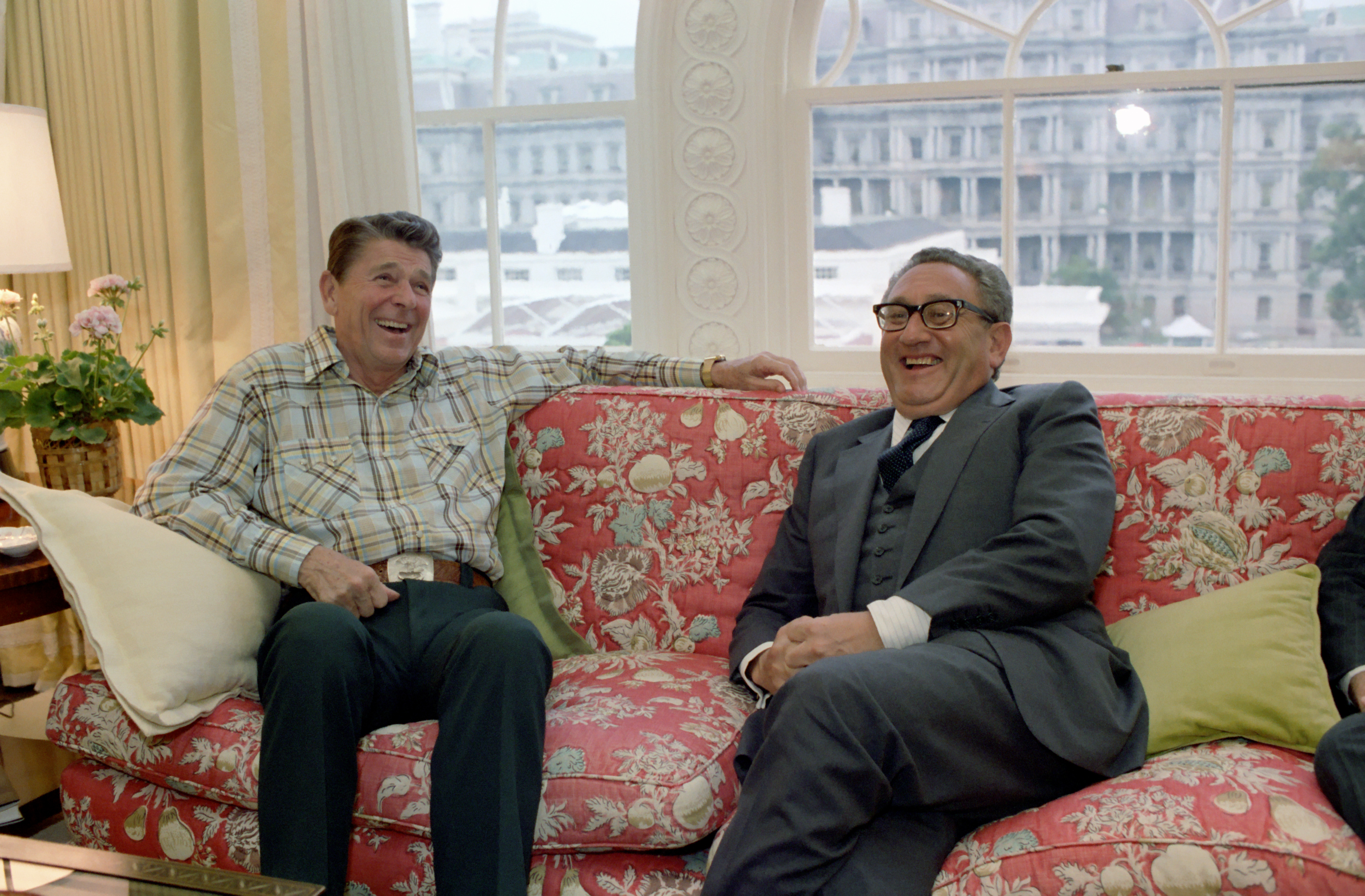
Kissinger meeting with President Ronald Reagan in the White House family quarters, 1981

After Nixon was forced to resign in August 1974 due to the Watergate scandal, Kissinger initially kept both of his positions as Secretary of State and National Security Advisor under the new presidential administration of Gerald Ford. However, his influence was somewhat diminished when he was replaced by Brent Scowcroft as National Security Advisor during the "Halloween Massacre" cabinet reshuffle of November 1975. Ford later explained his decision to journalist Thomas M. DeFrank: "When Kissinger had both State and NSC, there was not an independent evaluation of proposals, and I never liked that arrangement that I inherited. And when the time came to make some [other] changes at the Pentagon and CIA, it was logical to tell Henry, 'I'm gonna just leave you as secretary of state and upgrade Brent Scowcroft.'" Kissinger left office as Secretary of State when Democrat Jimmy Carter defeated Ford in the 1976 presidential election.

Kissinger continued to participate in policy groups, such as the Trilateral Commission, and to maintain political consulting, speaking, and writing engagements. In 1978, he was secretly involved in thwarting efforts by the Carter administration to indict three Chilean intelligence agents for masterminding the 1976 assassination of Orlando Letelier. Kissinger was critical of the foreign policy of the Carter administration, saying in 1980 that "has managed the extraordinary feat of having, at one and the same time, the worst relations with our allies, the worst relations with our adversaries, and the most serious upheavals in the developing world since the end of the Second World War."

After Kissinger left office in 1977, he was offered an endowed chair at Columbia University, which was met with student opposition. Kissinger instead accepted a position at Georgetown University's Center for Strategic and International Studies. He taught at Georgetown's Edmund Walsh School of Foreign Service for several years in the late 1970s. In 1982, with the help of a loan from the international banking firm of E.M. Warburg, Pincus and Company, Kissinger founded a consulting firm, Kissinger Associates, and was a partner in affiliate Kissinger McLarty Associates with Mack McLarty, former chief of staff to President Bill Clinton. He also served on the board of directors of Hollinger International, a Chicago-based newspaper group, and as of March 1999, was a director of Gulfstream Aerospace.

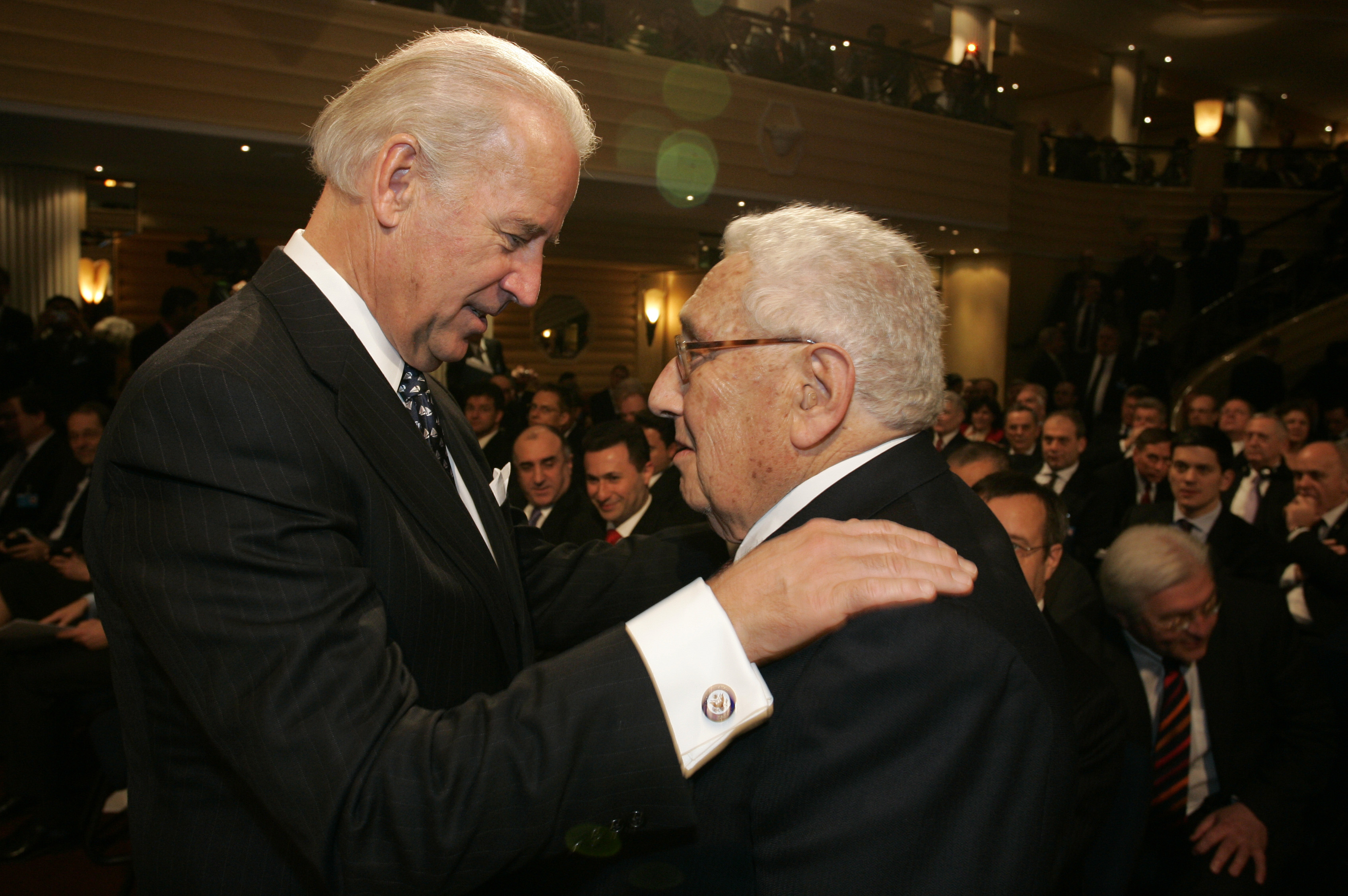
Kissinger and U.S. vice president Joe Biden at the Munich Security Conference in February 2009

In September 1989, The Wall Street Journal's John Fialka disclosed that Kissinger took a direct economic interest in U.S.–China relations in March 1989 with the establishment of China Ventures, Inc., a Delaware limited partnership, of which he was chairman of the board and chief executive officer. A US$75 million investment in a joint venture with the Communist Party government's primary commercial vehicle at the time, China International Trust & Investment Corporation (CITIC), was its purpose. Board members were major clients of Kissinger Associates. Kissinger was criticized for not disclosing his role in the venture when called upon by ABC's Peter Jennings to comment the morning after the June 4, 1989, Tiananmen Square massacre. Kissinger's position was generally supportive of Deng Xiaoping's decision to use the military against the demonstrating students and he opposed economic sanctions.

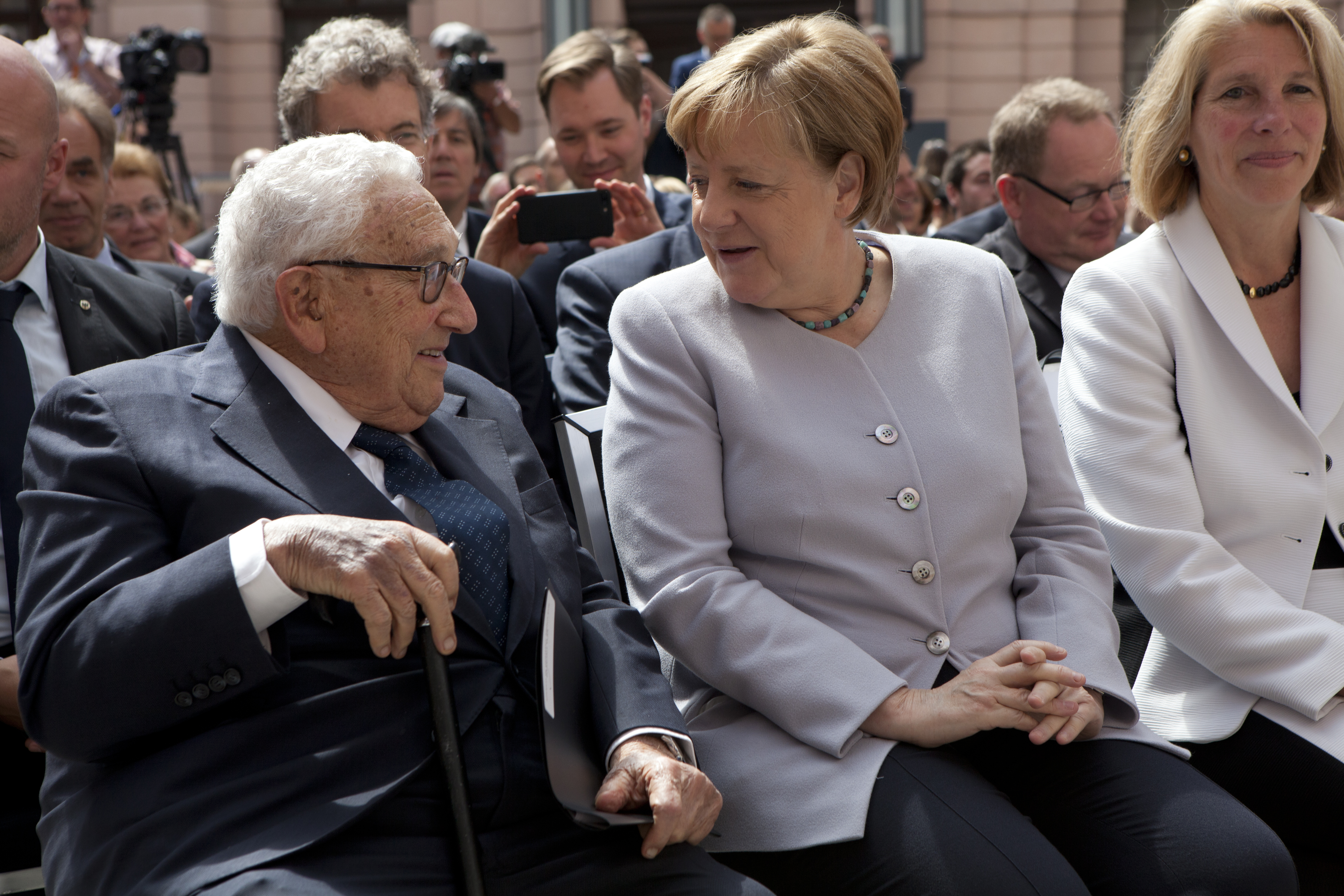
Kissinger with German chancellor Angela Merkel on June 21, 2017

From 1995 to 2001, Kissinger served on the board of directors for Freeport-McMoRan, a multinational copper and gold producer with significant mining and milling operations in Papua, Indonesia. In February 2000, president of Indonesia Abdurrahman Wahid appointed Kissinger as a political advisor. He also served as an honorary advisor to the United States-Azerbaijan Chamber of Commerce.

In 1998, in response to the 2002 Winter Olympic bid scandal, the International Olympic Committee formed a commission, called the "2000 Commission", to recommend reforms, which Kissinger served on. This service led in 2000 to his appointment as one of five IOC "honor members", a category the organization described as granted to "eminent personalities from outside the IOC who have rendered particularly outstanding services to it".

Kissinger served as the 22nd Chancellor of the College of William and Mary from 2000 to 2005. He was preceded by former British prime minister Margaret Thatcher and succeeded by Justice Sandra Day O'Connor.

From 2000 to 2006, Kissinger served as chairman of the board of trustees of Eisenhower Fellowships. In 2006, upon his departure from Eisenhower Fellowships, he received the Dwight D. Eisenhower Medal for Leadership and Service.

In September 2002, he joined Mikhail Piotrovsky and Jacob Rothschild as co-director of Mikhail Khodorkovsky's newly founded Open Russia Foundation (renamed to Future of Russia Foundation in December 2004, and to New Generation Europe Foundation in March 2023).

In November 2002, he was appointed by President George W. Bush to chair the newly established National Commission on Terrorist Attacks Upon the United States to investigate the September 11 attacks. Kissinger stepped down as chairman on December 13, 2002, rather than reveal his business client list, when queried about potential conflicts of interest.

In January 2007, Kissinger delivered a eulogy for Gerald Ford, one of the U.S. presidents he served, at Ford's state funeral in the Washington National Cathedral. In April 2008 Kissinger gave a eulogy for the conservative author and founder of the National Review, William F. Buckley at the latter's memorial service at St. Patrick's Cathedral in New York City.

In the Rio Tinto espionage case of 2009–2010, Kissinger was paid US$5 million to advise the multinational mining company how to distance itself from an employee who had been arrested in China for bribery.

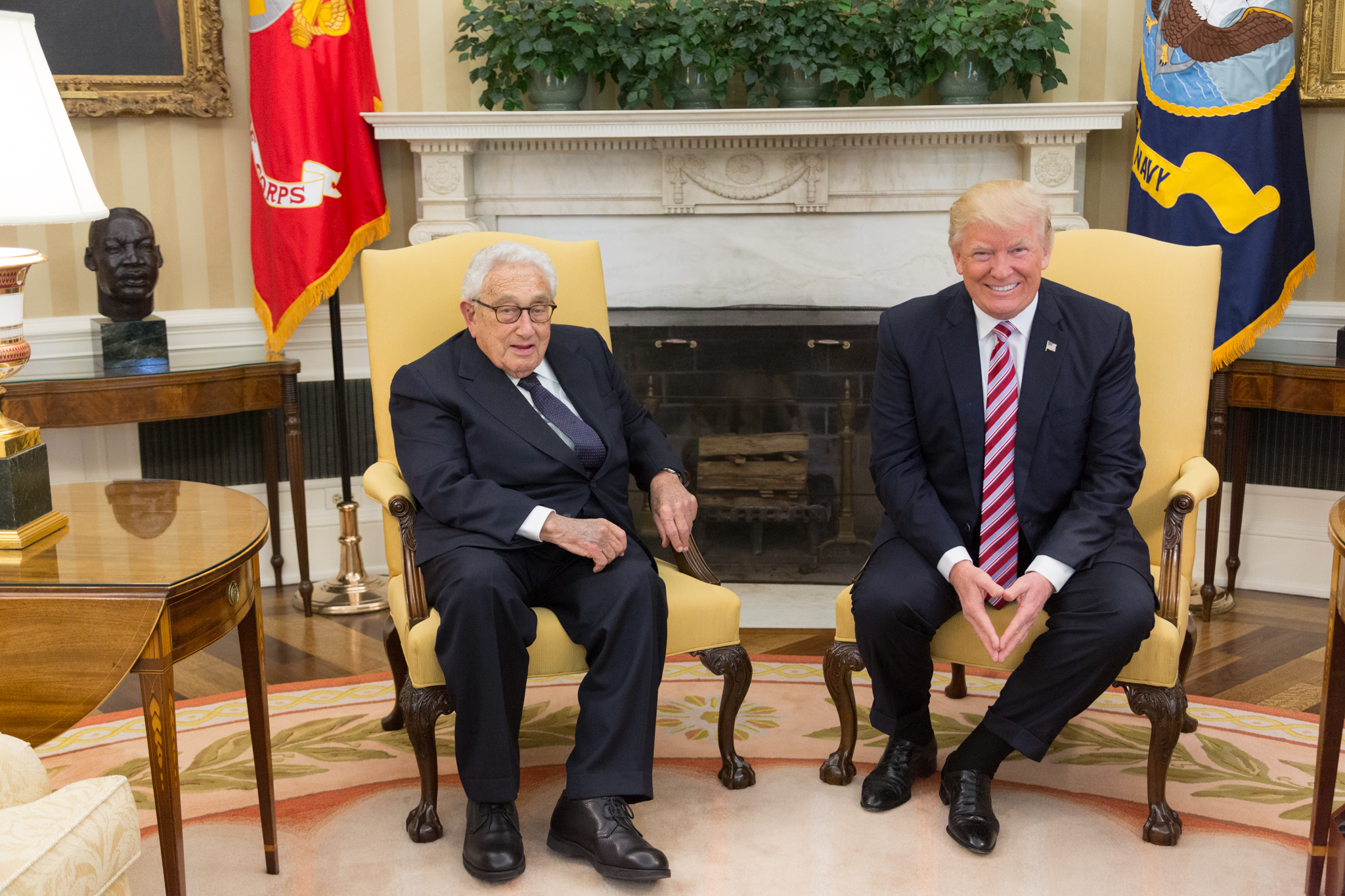
President Donald Trump meeting with Kissinger on May 10, 2017

Kissinger—along with William Perry, Sam Nunn, and George Shultz—called upon governments to embrace the vision of a world free of nuclear weapons, and in three op-eds in The Wall Street Journal proposed an ambitious program of urgent steps to that end. The four created the Nuclear Threat Initiative to advance this agenda. In 2010, the four were featured in a documentary film entitled Nuclear Tipping Point. The film is a visual and historical depiction of the ideas laid forth in The Wall Street Journal op-eds and reinforces their commitment to a world without nuclear weapons and the steps that can be taken to reach that goal.

On November 17, 2016, Kissinger met with President-elect Donald Trump during which they discussed global affairs. Kissinger also met with President Trump at the White House in May 2017.

In an interview with Charlie Rose on August 17, 2017, Kissinger said about President Trump: "I'm hoping for an Augustinian moment, for St. Augustine ... who in his early life followed a pattern that was quite incompatible with later on when he had a vision, and rose to sainthood. One does not expect the president to become that, but it's conceivable". Kissinger also argued that Russian president Vladimir Putin wanted to weaken Hillary Clinton, not elect Donald Trump. Kissinger said that Putin "thought—wrongly incidentally—that she would be extremely confrontational ... I think he tried to weaken the incoming president [Clinton]".

=== Views on U.S. foreign policy ===
==== Yugoslav Wars ====
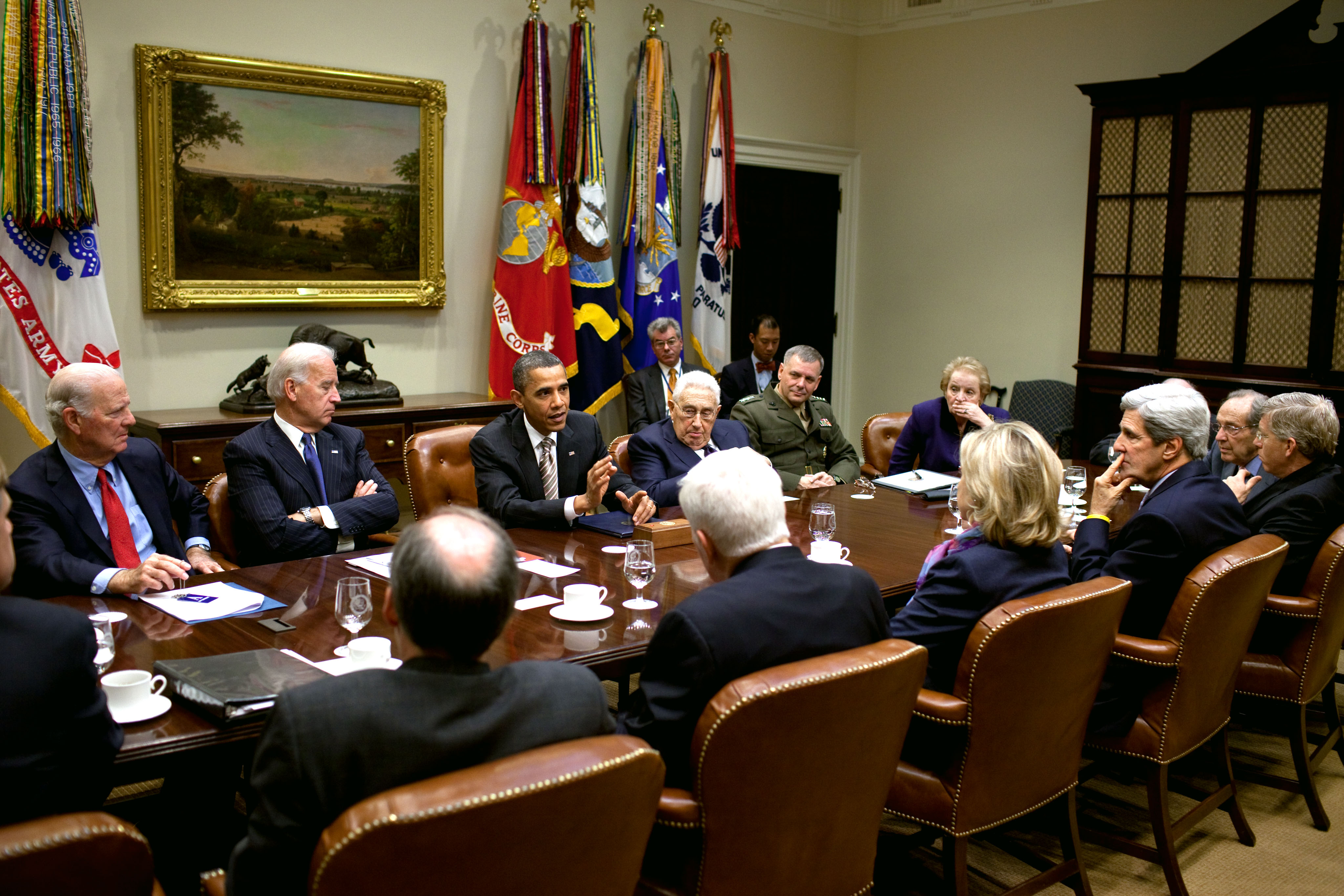
Kissinger, alongside President Barack Obama and other politicians, discussing the New START Treaty between the U.S. and Russia, 2010

In several articles of his and interviews that he gave during the Yugoslav Wars, he criticized the United States' policies in Southeast Europe, among other things for the recognition of Bosnia and Herzegovina as a sovereign state, which he described as a foolish act. Most importantly he dismissed the notion of Serbs and Croats being aggressors or separatist, saying that "they can't be separating from something that has never existed". In addition, he repeatedly warned the West against inserting itself into a conflict that has its roots at least hundreds of years back in time, and said that the West would do better if it allowed the Serbs and Croats to join their respective countries. Kissinger shared similarly critical views on Western involvement in Kosovo. In particular, he held a disparaging view of the Rambouillet Agreement:

The Rambouillet text, which called on Serbia to admit NATO troops throughout Yugoslavia, was a provocation, an excuse to start bombing. Rambouillet is not a document that any Serb could have accepted. It was a terrible diplomatic document that should never have been presented in that form.

However, as the Serbs did not accept the Rambouillet text and NATO bombings started, he opted to support a continuation of the bombing as NATO's credibility was now at stake, but dismissed the use of ground forces in claiming that it was not worth it.

==== Iraq ====
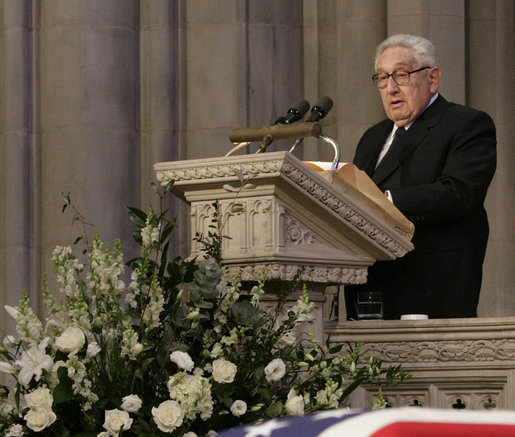
Kissinger speaking during Gerald Ford's funeral in January 2007

In 2006, it was reported in the book State of Denial by Bob Woodward that Kissinger met regularly with President George W. Bush and Vice President Dick Cheney to offer advice on the Iraq War. Kissinger confirmed in recorded interviews with Woodward that the advice was the same as he had given in a column in The Washington Post on August 12, 2005: "Victory over the insurgency is the only meaningful exit strategy." Kissinger also frequently met with U.S. Secretary of State Colin Powell, whom he warned that Coalition Provisional Authority Director L. Paul Bremer was "a control freak".

In an interview on the BBC's Sunday AM on November 19, 2006, Kissinger was asked whether there was any hope left for a clear military victory in Iraq and responded, "If you mean by 'military victory' an Iraqi government that can be established and whose writ runs across the whole country, that gets the civil war under control and sectarian violence under control in a time period that the political processes of the democracies will support, I don't believe that is possible. ... I think we have to redefine the course. But I don't believe that the alternative is between military victory as it had been defined previously, or total withdrawal."

In an interview with Peter Robinson of the Hoover Institution on April 3, 2008, Kissinger reiterated that even though he supported the 2003 invasion of Iraq, he thought that the George W. Bush administration rested too much of its case for war on Saddam's supposed weapons of mass destruction. Robinson noted that Kissinger had criticized the administration for invading with too few troops, for disbanding the Iraqi Army as part of de-Baathification, and for mishandling relations with certain allies.

==== India ====
Kissinger said in April 2008 that "India has parallel objectives to the United States", and he called the nation an ally of the U.S.

==== China ====
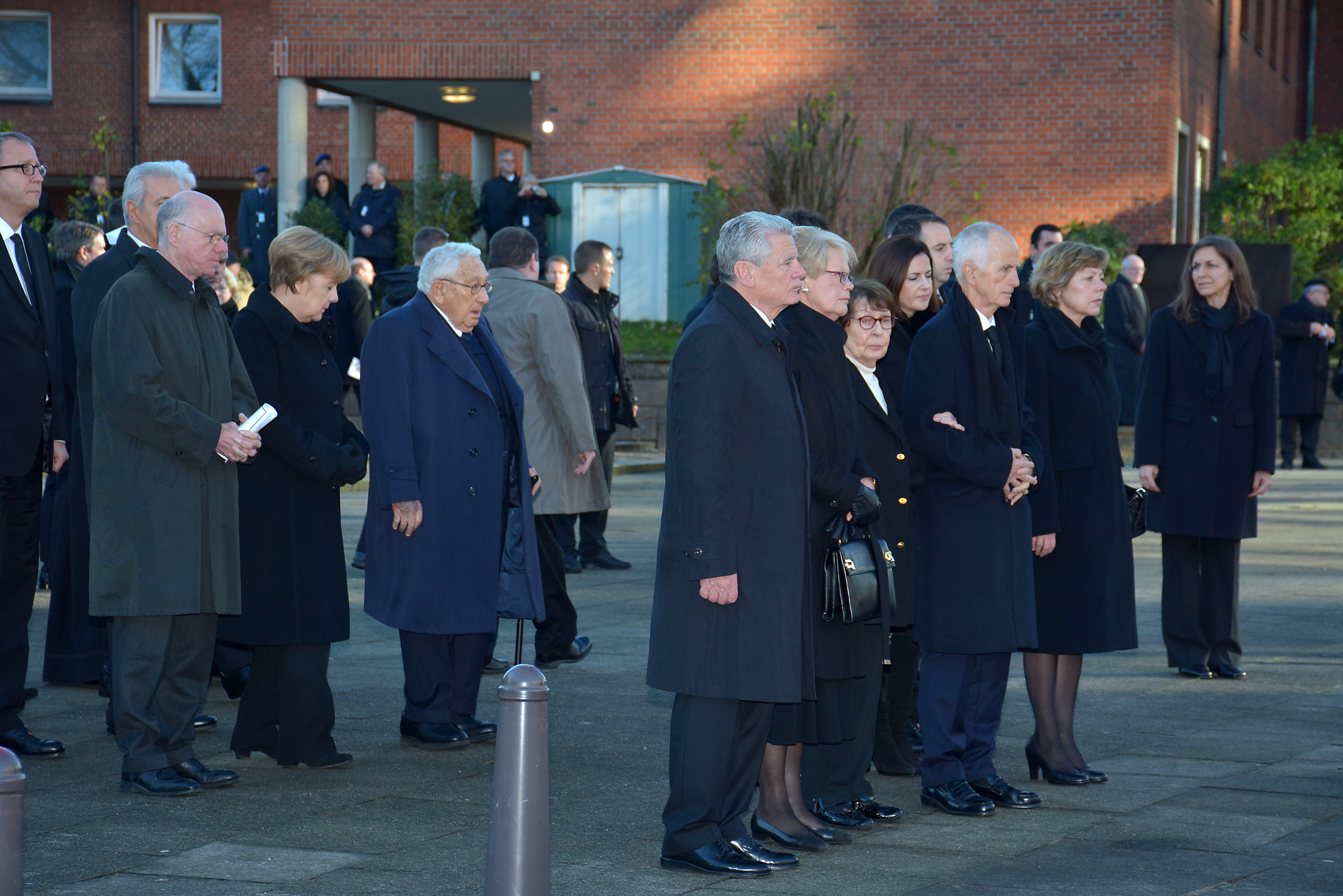
Angela Merkel and Kissinger attending the state funeral for former German chancellor Helmut Schmidt, November 23, 2015

Kissinger attended the opening ceremony of the 2008 Beijing Summer Olympics. A few months before the Games opened, as controversy over China's human rights record was intensifying due to criticism by Amnesty International and other groups of the widespread use of the death penalty and other issues, Kissinger told China's official press agency Xinhua: "I think one should separate Olympics as a sporting event from whatever political disagreements people may have had with China. I expect that the games will proceed in the spirit for which they were designed, which is friendship among nations, and that other issues are discussed in other forums." He said China had made huge efforts to stage the Games. "Friends of China should not use the Olympics to pressure China now." He added that he would bring two of his grandchildren to watch the Games and planned to attend the opening ceremony. During the Games, he participated with Australian swimmer Ian Thorpe, film star Jackie Chan, and former British prime minister Tony Blair at a Peking University forum on the qualities that make a champion. He sat with his wife Nancy Kissinger, President George W. Bush, former president George H. W. Bush, and Foreign Minister Yang Jiechi at the men's basketball game between China and the U.S.

External videos
- After Words interview with Kissinger on On China, June 11, 2011, C-SPAN
- Presentation by Kissinger on World Order, September 29, 2014, C-SPAN

In 2011, Kissinger published On China, chronicling the evolution of Sino-American relations and laying out the challenges to a partnership of "genuine strategic trust" between the U.S. and China. In this book On China and his 2014 book World Order, as well as in his 2018 interview with Financial Times, Kissinger consistently stated that he believed that China wants to restore its historic role as the Middle Kingdom and be "the principal adviser to all humanity".

In 2020, during a period of worsening Sino-American relations caused by the COVID-19 pandemic, the Hong Kong protests, and the U.S.–China trade war, Kissinger expressed concerns that the United States and China are entering a Second Cold War and will eventually become embroiled in a military conflict similar to World War I. He called for Chinese leader Xi Jinping and the incoming U.S. president-elect Joe Biden to take a less confrontational foreign policy. Kissinger previously said that a potential war between China and the United States would be "worse than the world wars that ruined European civilization".

In July 2023, Kissinger traveled to Beijing to meet with Chinese Defense Minister Li Shangfu, who was sanctioned by the U.S. government in 2018 for engaging in the purchase of combat aircraft from a Russian arms exporter. Kissinger emphasized Sino-American relations in the meeting, stating that "the United States and China should eliminate misunderstandings, coexist peacefully, and avoid confrontation". Later that trip, Kissinger met with Xi with the intention of defrosting relations between the U.S. and China.

==== Iran ====
Kissinger's position on this issue of U.S.–Iran talks was reported by the Tehran Times to be that "Any direct talks between the U.S. and Iran on issues such as the nuclear dispute would be most likely to succeed if they first involved only diplomatic staff and progressed to the level of secretary of state before the heads of state meet." In 2016, Kissinger said that the biggest challenge facing the Middle East is the "potential domination of the region by an Iran that is both imperial and jihadist". He further wrote in August 2017 that if the Islamic Revolutionary Guard Corps of Iran and its Shiite allies were allowed to fill the territorial vacuum left by a militarily defeated Islamic State of Iraq and the Levant, the region would be left with a land corridor extending from Iran to the Levant "which could mark the emergence of an Iranian radical empire". Commenting on the Joint Comprehensive Plan of Action, Kissinger said that he would not have agreed to it, but that Trump's plan to end the agreement after it was signed would "enable the Iranians to do more than us".

==== 2014 Ukrainian crisis ====
Henry Kissinger on April 26, 2016

On March 5, 2014, The Washington Post published an op-ed piece by Kissinger, 11 days before the Crimean status referendum on whether Crimea should officially keep being a part of Ukraine or join Russia. In it, he attempted to balance the Ukrainian, Russian, and Western desires for a functional state. He made four main points:

1. Ukraine should have the right to choose freely its economic and political associations, including with Europe;
2. Ukraine should not join NATO, a repetition of the position he took seven years before;
3. Ukraine should be free to create any government compatible with the expressed will of its people. Wise Ukrainian leaders would then opt for a policy of reconciliation between the various parts of their country. He imagined an international position for Ukraine like that of Finland.
4. Ukraine should maintain sovereignty over Crimea.

Kissinger also wrote: "The west speaks Ukrainian; the east speaks mostly Russian. Any attempt by one wing of Ukraine to dominate the other—as has been the pattern—would lead eventually to civil war or break up."

Following the publication of his book titled World Order, Kissinger participated in an interview with Charlie Rose and updated his position on Ukraine, which he saw as a possible geographical mediator between Russia and the West. In a question he posed to himself for illustration regarding re-conceiving policy regarding Ukraine, Kissinger stated: "If Ukraine is considered an outpost, then the situation is that its eastern border is the NATO strategic line, and NATO will be within 200 miles (320 km) of Volgograd. That will never be accepted by Russia. On the other hand, if the Russian western line is at the border of Poland, Europe will be permanently disquieted. The Strategic objective should have been to see whether one can build Ukraine as a bridge between East and West, and whether one can do it as a kind of a joint effort."

In December 2016, Kissinger advised President-elect Donald Trump to accept "Crimea as a part of Russia" in an attempt to secure a rapprochement between the United States and Russia, whose relations soured as a result of the Crimean crisis. When asked if he explicitly considered Russia's sovereignty over Crimea legitimate, Kissinger answered in the affirmative, reversing the position he took in his Washington Post op-ed.

==== Computers and nuclear weapons ====
In 2019, Kissinger wrote about the increasing tendency to give control of nuclear weapons to computers operating with artificial intelligence (AI) that: "Adversaries' ignorance of AI-developed configurations will become a strategic advantage". Kissinger argued that giving power to launch nuclear weapons to computers using algorithms to make decisions would eliminate the human factor and give the advantage to the state that had the most effective AI system as a computer can make decisions about war and peace far faster than any human ever could. Just as an AI-enhanced computer can win chess games by anticipating human decision-making, an AI-enhanced computer could be useful in a crisis as in a nuclear war, the side that strikes first would have the advantage by destroying the opponent's nuclear capacity. Kissinger also noted there was always the danger that a computer could make a decision to start a nuclear war before diplomacy had been exhausted, or for a reason that would not be understandable to the operators. Kissinger also warned the use of AI to control nuclear weapons would impose "opacity" on the decision-making process as the algorithms that control the AI system are not readily understandable, destabilizing the decision-making process:

grand strategy requires an understanding of the capabilities and military deployments of potential adversaries. But if more and more intelligence becomes opaque, how will policy makers understand the views and abilities of their adversaries and perhaps even allies? Will many different internets emerge or, in the end, only one? What will be the implications for cooperation? For confrontation? As AI becomes ubiquitous, new concepts for its security need to emerge.

==== COVID-19 pandemic ====
On April 3, 2020, Kissinger shared his diagnostic view of the COVID-19 pandemic, saying that it threatens the "liberal world order". Kissinger added that the virus does not know borders although global leaders are trying to address the crisis on a mainly national basis. He stressed that the key is not a purely national effort but greater international cooperation.

==== Russo-Ukrainian war ====
In May 2022, speaking to the World Economic Forum on the Russo-Ukrainian war, Kissinger advocated for a diplomatic settlement that would restore the status quo ante bellum, effectively ceding Crimea and parts of Donbas to Russian control. Kissinger urged Ukrainians to "match the heroism they have shown with wisdom", arguing that "[p]ursuing the war beyond that point would not be about the freedom of Ukraine, but a new war against Russia itself." He spoke to Edward Luce and a Financial Times audience in the same month. Ukrainian president Volodymyr Zelenskyy rejected Kissinger's suggestions, saying Ukraine would not agree to peace until Russia agreed to return Crimea and the Donbas region to Ukraine.

On a book tour to sell Leadership: Six Studies in World Strategy in July 2022 he spoke to Judy Woodruff of PBS and he was still of the opinion that "a negotiation is desirable" and clarified his earlier statements, saying that he supported a ceasefire line on the borders of February 24 and that "Russia should not gain anything from the war... Ukraine above all cannot give up territory that it had when the war started because this would be symbolically dangerous."

On January 18, 2023, Kissinger was interviewed by Graham Allison for a World Economic Forum audience; he said that U.S. support should be intensified until either the February 24 borders are reached or the February 24 borders are recognized, upon which time under a ceasefire agreement negotiations would begin. Kissinger felt that Russia needs to be given an opportunity to rejoin the comity of nations while the sanctions are maintained until final settlement is reached. He expressed his admiration for President Zelenskyy and lauded the heroic conduct of the Ukrainian people. Kissinger felt that the invasion has ipso facto its logical outcome pointed to NATO membership for Ukraine at the end of the peace process.

In September 2023, Kissinger met with Volodymyr Zelenskyy in New York City, on which occasion they discussed his change in position on Ukraine's NATO membership ambitions. In September 2023, Kissinger also presented a reformulated response endorsing Ukraine's NATO membership as an "appropriate outcome", which could be seen as a substantial boost to the transatlantic aspirations of embattled Ukraine.

==== Gaza war ====
In a statement made a month before his death, Kissinger responded to the October 7 attacks and outbreak of the Gaza war by saying that the goals of Hamas "can only be to mobilize the Arab world against Israel and to get off the track of peaceful negotiations". In response to celebrations of the attack by some Arabs in Germany, he issued a statement denouncing Muslim immigration into Germany: "It was a grave mistake to let in so many people of totally different culture and religion and concepts, because it creates a pressure group inside each country that does that."

== Public perception ==
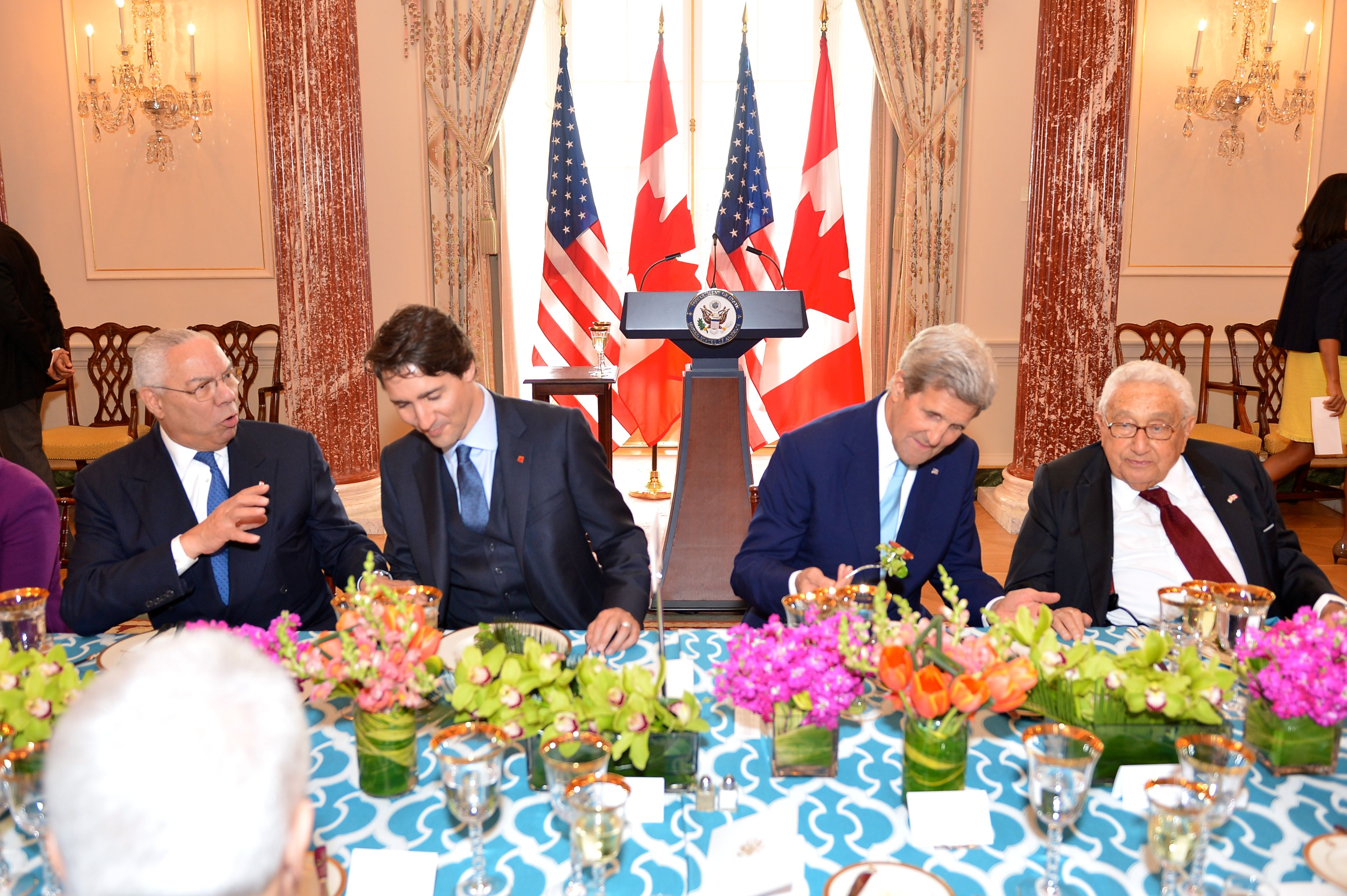
Colin Powell, Canadian prime minister Justin Trudeau, Secretary of State John Kerry, and Kissinger in March 2016

Nixon's and Kissinger's conversation on October 6, 1972

A 2014 poll of American international relations scholars conducted by the College of William & Mary ranked Kissinger as the most effective Secretary of State in the 50 years prior to 2015. In 1972, Time commented that "a streak of suspicion seems to underlie all that he does" and "His jokes about his paranoia have an uncomfortable edge of truth". He was so often seen escorting Hollywood starlets that the Village Voice charged he was "a secret square posing as a swinger". The insight, "Power is the ultimate aphrodisiac", is widely attributed to him, although Kissinger was paraphrasing Napoleon Bonaparte.

Historian Jeffrey Kimball developed the theory that Kissinger and the Nixon administration accepted a possible South Vietnamese collapse provided a face-saving decent interval passed between U.S. withdrawal and defeat. Similarly, in his book Henry Kissinger and the American Century, Jeremi Suri wrote: "By 1971 [Kissinger] and Nixon would accept a 'decent interval' between U.S. disengagement and a North Vietnamese takeover in the south. Secret talks with Hanoi would allow Kissinger to manage this process, preserving the image of American strength and credibility." In his first meeting with Zhou Enlai in 1971, Kissinger "laid out in detail the settlement terms that would produce such a delayed defeat: total American withdrawal, return of all American POWs, and a ceasefire-in-place for '18 months or some period'", in the words of historian Ken Hughes. On October 6, 1972, Kissinger told Nixon twice that the terms of the Paris Peace Accords would probably destroy South Vietnam: "I also think that Thieu is right, that our terms will eventually destroy him." However, Kissinger denied using a "decent interval" strategy, writing "All of us who negotiated the agreement of October 12 were convinced that we had vindicated the anguish of a decade not by a 'decent interval' but by a decent settlement." Johannes Kadura offers a positive assessment of Nixon and Kissinger's strategy, arguing that the two men "simultaneously maintained a Plan A of further supporting Saigon and a Plan B of shielding Washington should their maneuvers prove futile." According to Kadura, the "decent interval" concept has been "largely misrepresented", in that Nixon and Kissinger "sought to gain time, make the North turn inward, and create a perpetual equilibrium" rather than acquiescing in the collapse of South Vietnam.

Kissinger's record was brought up during the 2016 Democratic Party presidential primaries. Hillary Clinton had cultivated a close relationship with Kissinger, describing him as a "friend" and a source of "counsel". During the Democratic primary debates, Clinton touted Kissinger's praise for her record as secretary of state. In response, candidate Bernie Sanders criticized Kissinger and said: "I am proud to say that Henry Kissinger is not my friend. I will not take advice from Henry Kissinger."

Kissinger was an immensely beloved figure within China, with China News Service describing him in his obituary as someone "who had a sharp vision and a thorough understanding of world affairs".

=== Legacy and reception ===
Kissinger has generally received a polarizing reception; some have portrayed him as a strategic genius who was willing to act in a utilitarian manner, others have portrayed his foreign policy decisions as immoral and profoundly damaging in the long run.

==== Positive views ====
Historian Niall Ferguson has argued that Kissinger was one of the most effective secretaries of state in American history. The editorial board of The Wall Street Journal stated in the aftermath of his death "Kissinger was a target of both the right and left in those perilous Cold War years, often unfairly". The article noted that he was often criticized by American conservatives for overlooking human rights in China, while saying "he had no illusions about the Communist Party or its nationalist ambitions. His view was that the U.S. and China had to achieve some modus vivendi to avoid war despite their profound cultural and political differences" while claiming that "the alternatives then, as now, weren't usually [democracy advocates] of the left's imagining. They were often Communists who would have aligned themselves with the Soviets ... . The U.S. provided covert aid to Allende's political opponents, but declassified briefings from the time show the U.S. was unaware of the military coup that deposed him. Kissinger wasn't responsible for Augusto Pinochet's coup or its bloody excesses. Chile eventually became a democracy ... Cuba remains a dictatorship."

==== Negative views ====
A number of journalists, activists, and human rights lawyers accused Kissinger of being responsible for war crimes during his tenure in government. Some sought civil and even criminal penalties against Kissinger, but none of these attempts were successful. In September 2001, relatives and survivors of General Rene Schneider filed civil proceedings in federal court in Washington, D.C. The suit was later dismissed. In April 2002, a petition for Kissinger's arrest was filed in the High Court of Justice in London by human rights campaigner Peter Tatchell, citing the destruction of civilian populations and the environment in Indochina during the years 1969–1975. The petition was rejected one day after filing.

One of his most prominent critics was American-British journalist and author Christopher Hitchens. Hitchens authored The Trial of Henry Kissinger (2001), in which he called for the prosecution of Kissinger "for war crimes, for crimes against humanity, and for offenses against common or customary or international law, including conspiracy to commit murder, kidnap, and torture". American chef and TV personality Anthony Bourdain wrote in A Cook's Tour: "Once you've been to Cambodia, you'll never stop wanting to beat Henry Kissinger to death with your bare hands... Witness what [he] did... and you will never understand why he's not sitting in the dock at The Hague next to Milošević."

Author Robert D. Kaplan and historian Niall Ferguson have disputed these notions and argued that there is a double standard in how Kissinger is judged in comparison to others. They have defended Kissinger by arguing that American power to advocate for human rights in other nations is often counterproductive and limited, that taking into consideration geopolitical realities is an inevitable part of any effective foreign policy, and that there are utilitarian reasons to defend most of the decisions of his tenure.

==== Other perspectives ====
Several historians have rejected both prominent reputations of Kissinger. David Greenberg argued that each are exaggerated caricatures that overstate both his genius and immorality:

In fact, if there's a single word I'd apply to Kissinger, it's 'overrated.' He was overrated as a scholar (famous mainly for writing a very long dissertation). He was overrated as a strategist (he often gave bad advice, as he did in urging George W. Bush not to withdraw troops from Iraq). He was even overrated as a villain – the 'Christopher Hitchenses' of the world loved to call him a 'war criminal,' but this was a fundamentally unserious charge. The Defense Department, not the State Department, prosecutes wars, and the president oversees it – but the Hitchenses preferred to go after Kissinger rather than (Defense Secretaries) Mel Laird or James Schlesinger or even Nixon.

Similarly, Mario Del Pero argued:

He was not particularly original or bold, once we scratch away from his writings the deliberately opaque and convoluted prose he often used, possibly to try to render more original thoughts and reflections that were in reality fairly conventional. ... In short, he wasn't a war criminal, he wasn't a very deep or sophisticated thinker, he rarely challenged the intellectual vogues of the time (even because it would have meant to challenge those in power, something he always was—and still is—reluctant to do), and once in government he displayed a certain intellectual laziness vis-à-vis the intricacies and complexities of a world that he still tended to see in black-and-white.

== Family and personal life ==
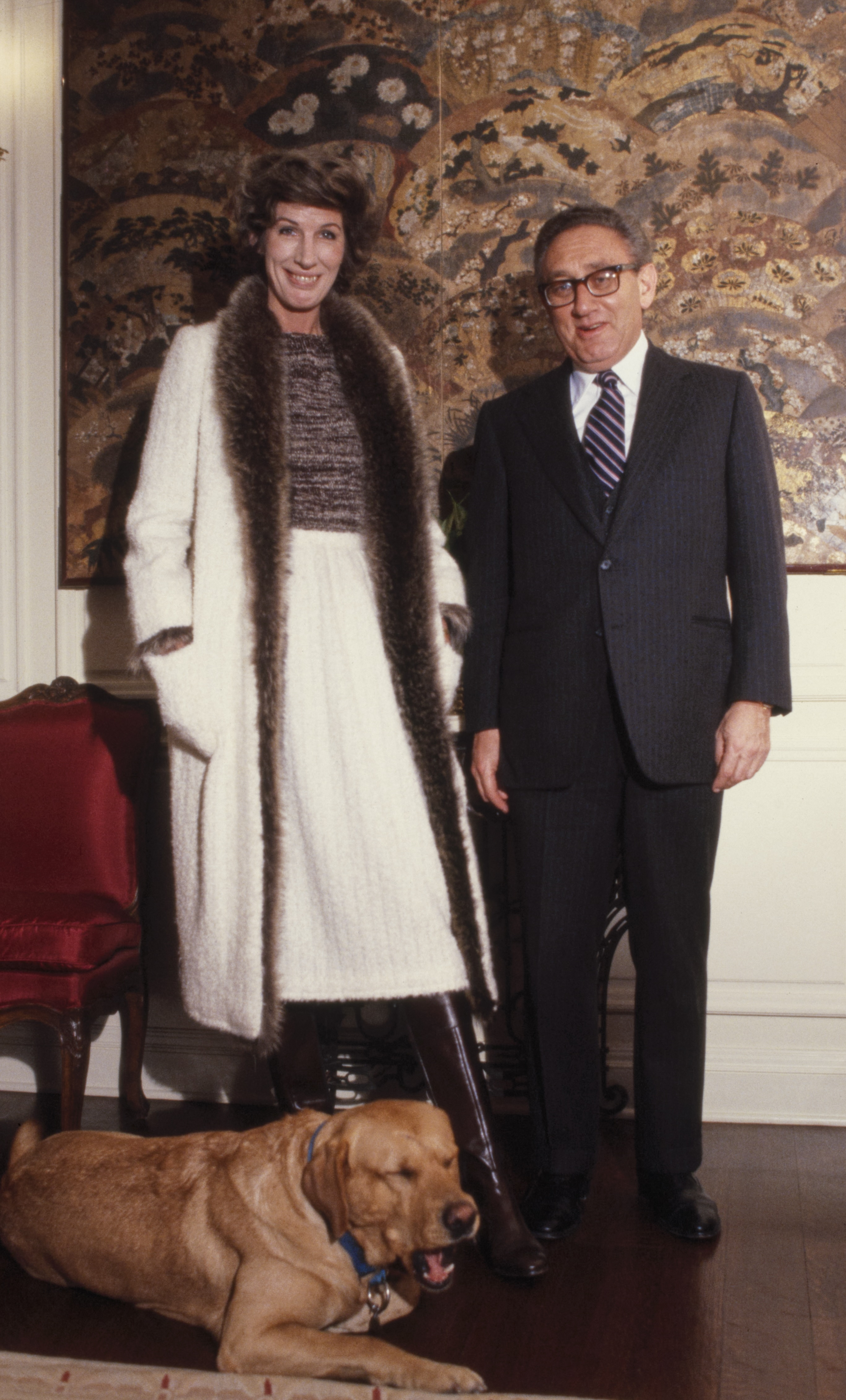
Nancy and Henry Kissinger in their New York City apartment with their dog Tyler, 1978

Kissinger married Anneliese "Ann" Fleischer (born November 6, 1925, in Fürth, Germany) on February 6, 1949. They had two children, Elizabeth and David, and divorced in 1964. In 1955, he met Austrian poet Ingeborg Bachmann during a symposium at Harvard; the two had a romantic relationship that lasted several years. On March 30, 1974, he married Nancy Maginnes. They lived in Kent, Connecticut, and in New York City. Kissinger's son David served as an executive with NBC Universal Television Studio before becoming head of Conaco, Conan O'Brien's production company, in 2005. In February 1982, at the age of 58, Henry Kissinger underwent coronary bypass surgery. On May 27, 2023, he turned 100.

=== Soccer ===
Daryl Grove characterized Kissinger as one of the most influential people in the growth of soccer in the United States. Kissinger was named chairman of the North American Soccer League board of directors in 1978. He helped bring Brazilian star Pelé to the New York Cosmos after calling the Brazilian foreign minister and telling him that Pele's move to America would substantially improve relations between the United States and Brazil. Previously, the military dictatorship in Brazil had been reluctant to let a designated national treasure leave the country. In a 2023 interview, Kissinger said soccer was "at the highest level complexity masquerading as simplicity."

Since his childhood, Kissinger had been a fan of his hometown's soccer club, SpVgg Fürth (now SpVgg Greuther Fürth). Even during his time in office, the German Embassy informed him about the team's results every Monday morning. He was an honorary member with lifetime season tickets. In September 2012, Kissinger attended a home game in which Greuther Fürth lost 0–2 against Schalke, after promising years previously that he would attend a Greuther Fürth home game if they were promoted to the Bundesliga from the 2. Bundesliga. From 1989 onward, he was an honorary member of Bayern Munich.

== Death ==
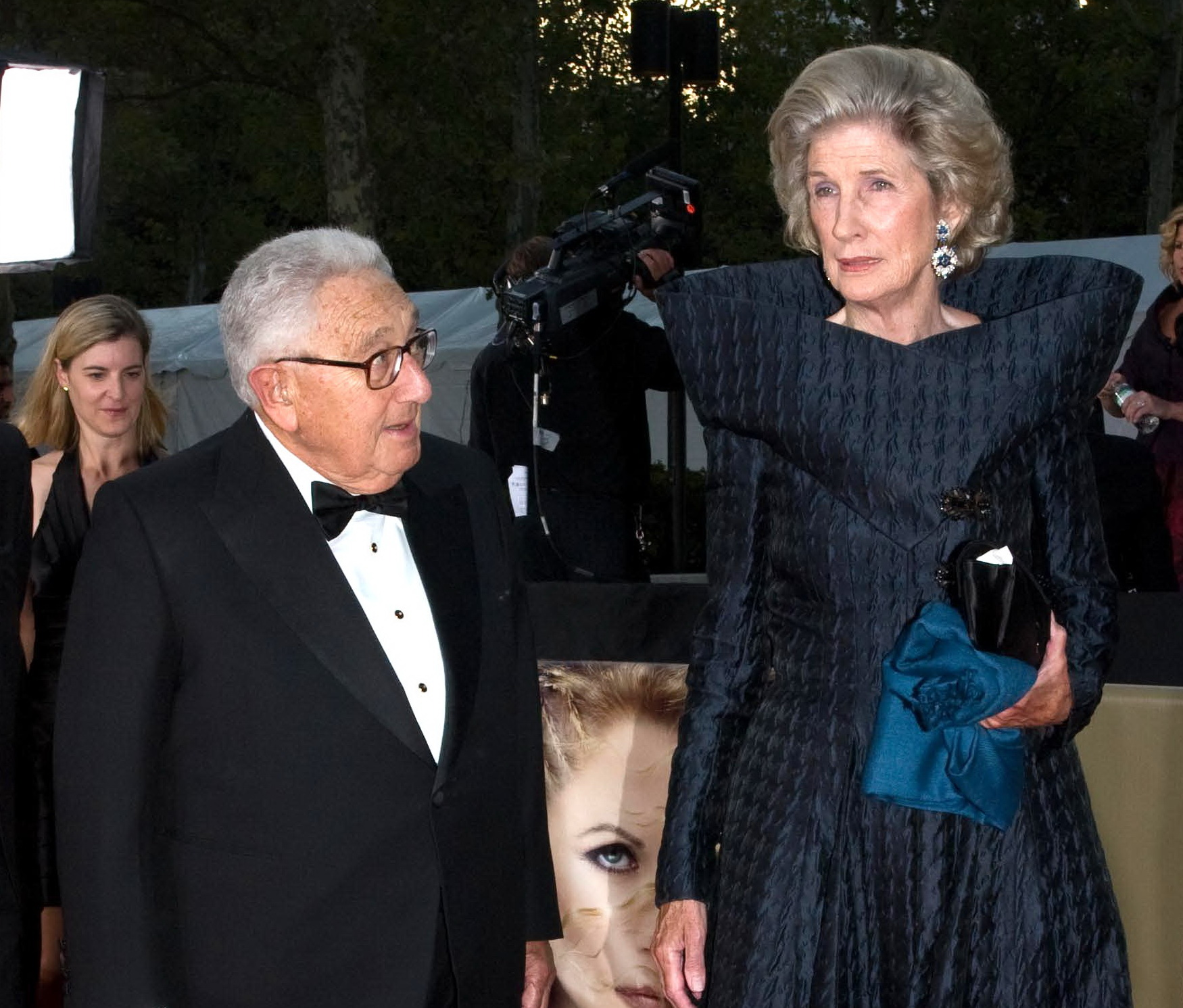
Henry and Nancy Kissinger at the Metropolitan Opera opening in 2008

Kissinger died from heart failure at his home in Kent, Connecticut, on November 29, 2023, at the age of 100. At the time of his death, he was the last living former U.S. Cabinet member who served in the Richard Nixon administration. He was survived by his wife, Nancy Maginnes Kissinger; two children, David and Elizabeth; and five grandchildren. His death was announced by Kissinger Associates, his consulting firm. Kissinger Associates announced that the funeral would be private. He was buried in Arlington National Cemetery.

=== International reactions ===
Kissinger was one of the most well-known Americans in China and praised by the Chinese Communist Party. He was responsible for beginning US-China relations in the 1970s and recognising PRC as the One China, attracting antagonism in Taiwan (ROC). Government figures on state media uniformly released posts mourning his death. Chinese social media expressed widespread sorrow after news of his death was released, and hashtags idolizing Kissinger became the most searched trend in China. China News Service stated in its obituary for Kissinger that "Today, this 'old friend of the Chinese people,' who had a sharp vision and a thorough understanding of world affairs, has completed his legendary life". China Central Television, the state broadcaster, called Kissinger a "legendary diplomat" and a "living fossil" who had witnessed the development of China-U.S. relations. Shortly before his death, Chinese president Xi Jinping stated: "The Chinese people never forget their old friends, and Sino-U.S. relations will always be linked with the name of Henry Kissinger".

Former British prime ministers mourned Kissinger. Tony Blair, the former leader of the Labour Party and prime minister of the United Kingdom, released a statement saying: "There is no-one like Henry Kissinger... From the first time I met him as a new Labour Party opposition leader in 1994, struggling to form views on foreign policy, to the last occasion when I visited him in New York and, later, he spoke at my institute's annual gathering, I was in awe of him... If it is possible for diplomacy, at its highest level, to be a form of art, Henry was an artist." David Cameron stated "He was a great statesman and a deeply respected diplomat who will be greatly missed on the world stage... Even at 100, his wisdom and thoughtfulness shone through". Boris Johnson said: "The world needs him now. If ever there was an author of peace and lover of concord, that man was Henry Kissinger".

European Council president Charles Michel called Kissinger a "strategist with attention to the smallest detail" and "a kind human and a brilliant mind who, over 100 years, shaped the [destinies] of some of the most important events of the century." Russian president Vladimir Putin stated in a telegram to Kissinger's widow Nancy that he was a "wise and farsighted statesman". Israeli prime minister Benjamin Netanyahu stated that he "had the privilege of meeting Dr. Kissinger on numerous occasions, the most recent being just two months ago in New York. Each meeting with him was not just a lesson in diplomacy but also a masterclass in statesmanship. His understanding of the complexities of international relations and his unique insights into the challenges facing our world were unparalleled." German chancellor Olaf Scholz stated: "The world has lost a great diplomat".

Chile's ambassador to the United States, Juan Gabriel Valdés, released a statement saying he possessed "brilliance" but also "profound moral wretchedness". This statement was reposted by President Gabriel Boric. The Bangladeshi foreign minister AK Abdul Momen said that Kissinger did "inhumane things", adding that "he should have apologized to the people of Bangladesh for what he has done".

=== Domestic reactions ===
The announcement of Kissinger's death saw a widespread mix of tribute and criticism on American social media.

Joe Biden praised Kissinger's "fierce intellect" while noting that they often "disagreed strongly". Former president George W. Bush stated: "America has lost one of the most dependable and distinctive voices on foreign affairs with the passing of Henry Kissinger. I have long admired the man who fled the Nazis as a young boy from a Jewish family, then fought them in the United States Army". Cindy McCain, the widow of John McCain, wrote: "Henry Kissinger was ever present in my late husband's life. While John was a prisoner of war, and in the later years, as a senator and statesman. The McCain family will miss his wit, charm, and intelligence terribly".

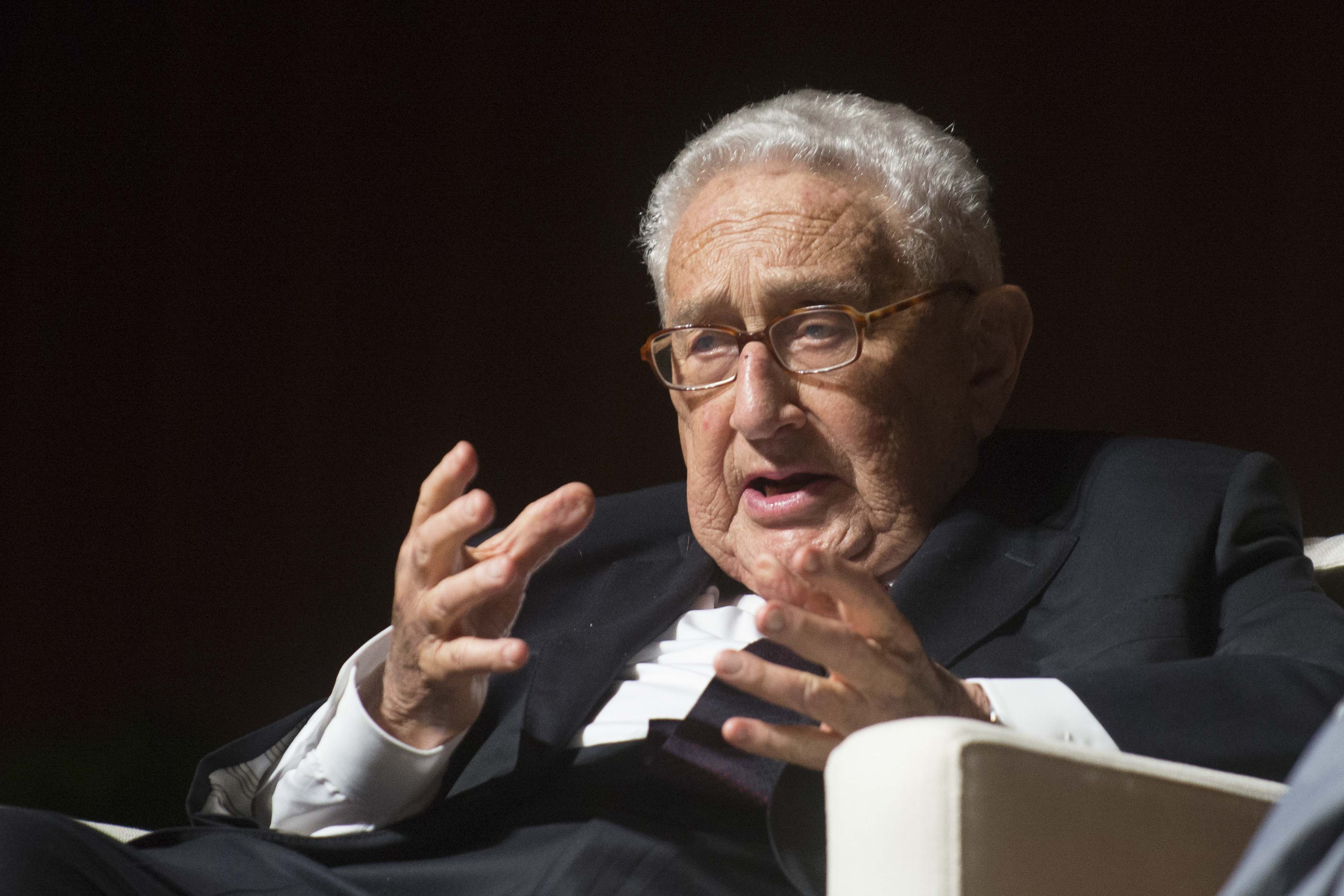
Kissinger at the LBJ Library in 2016

Many negative reactions to Kissinger's death argued his decisions in government violated American values. House of Representative members Jim McGovern, Gerry Connolly, and Greg Casar issued critical reactions to his death, with Connolly stating Kissinger's "indifference to human suffering will forever tarnish his name and shape his legacy". The front page of HuffPost labeled him "The Beltway Butcher", while another HuffPost article described him as "America's Most Notorious War Criminal". Teen Vogue mocked Kissinger with the headline: "War Criminal Responsible for Millions of Deaths Dies at 100", a statement similar to that of Nick Turse of The Intercept. A CNN op-ed by Peter Bergen entitled "Christopher Hitchens was right about Henry Kissinger" stated that to Kissinger "the ends almost always justified the means," referencing Hitchens's 2001 book The Trial of Henry Kissinger. Socialist magazine Jacobin released a book-length anthology entitled The Good Die Young. The introduction by historian Greg Grandin notes "We all live now in the Kissingerian void."

Kissinger was defended by conservative commentator David Harsanyi in an op-ed on the New York Post, where he stated that "the left disgustingly dances on Kissinger's grave because it hates America". The New York Sun also defended Kissinger, describing him as "one of the most remarkable figures in American history".

== Awards, honors, and associations ==
- Kissinger and Lê Đức Thọ were jointly offered the 1973 Nobel Peace Prize for their work on the Paris Peace Accords which prompted the withdrawal of American forces from the Vietnam War. Lê Đức Thọ declined to accept the award on the grounds that peace had not actually been achieved in Vietnam. Kissinger donated his prize money to charity, did not attend the award ceremony and later offered to return his prize medal after the fall of South Vietnam to North Vietnamese forces 18 months later.
- In 1973, Kissinger received the U.S. Senator John Heinz Award for Greatest Public Service by an Elected or Appointed Official, an award given out annually by Jefferson Awards.
- In 1976, Kissinger became the first honorary member of the Harlem Globetrotters.
- On January 13, 1977, Kissinger received the Presidential Medal of Freedom with distinction from President Gerald Ford.
- In 1980, Kissinger won the National Book Award in History (hardcover) (Note: From 1980 to 1983 there were dual hardcover and paperback awards in most categories, and multiple nonfiction subcategories. Most of the paperback award-winners were reprints, including Kissinger's.) for the first volume of his memoirs, The White House Years.
- In 1986, Kissinger was one of twelve recipients of the Medal of Liberty.
- In 1995, Kissinger was made an honorary Knight Commander of the Most Distinguished Order of St Michael and St George.
- In 2000, Kissinger received the Sylvanus Thayer Award at United States Military Academy at West Point.
- In 2002, Kissinger became an honorary member of the International Olympic Committee.
- On March 1, 2012, Kissinger was awarded Israel's President's Medal.
- In October 2013, Kissinger was awarded the Henry A. Grunwald Award for Public Service by Lighthouse International.
- Kissinger was a member of the Founding Council of the Rothermere American Institute, University of Oxford.
- Kissinger was a member of the following groups:
  - Aspen Institute
  - Atlantic Council
  - Bilderberg Group
  - Bohemian Club
  - Council on Foreign Relations
  - Center for Strategic and International Studies
  - Le Cercle
  - Pilgrims Society
  - Trilateral Commission
  - World.minds
  - Bloomberg New Economy Forum
- Kissinger served on the board of Theranos, a health technology company, from 2014 to 2017.
- He received the Theodore Roosevelt American Experience Award from the Union League Club of New York in 2009.
- He became the Honorary Chair of the advisory board for the Bloomberg New Economy Forum in 2018.
- He also received the Ellis Island Medal of Honor.
- In 2023, he received the Bavarian Maximilian Order for Science and Art from Minister-President of Bavaria Markus Söder.
- He was an Honorary Member of Bayern Munich.

== Notable works ==
=== Theses ===
- 1950. The Meaning of History: Reflections on Spengler, Toynbee and Kant. Bachelor's honors thesis. Harvard University.
- 1957. A World Restored: Metternich, Castlereagh and the Problems of Peace, 1812–22. PhD thesis, ISBN 0-395-17229-2.

=== Memoirs ===
External videos
- Presentation by Kissinger on Years of Renewal, March 23, 1999, C-SPAN
- Presentation by Kissinger on Years of Renewal, April 19, 1999, C-SPAN
- Washington Journal interview with Kissinger on Years of Renewal, June 22, 1999, C-SPAN

- 1979. The White House Years. ISBN 0-316-49661-8 (National Book Award, History [hardcover])
- 1982. Years of Upheaval. ISBN 0-316-28591-9
- 1999. Years of Renewal. ISBN 0-684-85571-2

=== Public policy ===
External videos
- Presentation by Kissinger on Diplomacy, April 7, 1994, C-SPAN
- Presentation by Kissinger on Does America Need a Foreign Policy?, July 15, 2001, C-SPAN
- Interview with Kissinger on Crisis, September 3, 2003, C-SPAN
- Interview with Kissinger on Crisis, December 16, 2003 , C-SPAN

- 1957. Nuclear Weapons and Foreign Policy. New York: Published for the Council on Foreign Relations by Harper & Brothers. Foreword by Gordon Dean (pp. vii–x).
- 1961. The Necessity for Choice: Prospects of American Foreign Policy. ISBN 0-06-012410-5.
- 1965. The Troubled Partnership: A Re-Appraisal of the Atlantic Alliance. Westport, Conn.: Greenwood Press. ISBN 0-07-034895-2.
- 1969. American Foreign Policy: Three Essays. ISBN 0-297-17933-0.
- 1981. For the Record: Selected Statements 1977–1980. ISBN 0-316-49663-4.
- 1985. Observations: Selected Speeches and Essays 1982–1984. Boston: Little, Brown. ISBN 0-316-49664-2.
- 1994. Diplomacy. ISBN 0-671-65991-X.
- 1998. Kissinger Transcripts: The Top Secret Talks With Beijing and Moscow, edited by William Burr. New York: New Press. ISBN 1-56584-480-7.
- 2001. Does America Need a Foreign Policy? Toward a Diplomacy for the 21st Century. ISBN 0-684-85567-4.
- 2002. Vietnam: A Personal History of America's Involvement in and Extrication from the Vietnam War. ISBN 0-7432-1916-3.
- 2003. Crisis: The Anatomy of Two Major Foreign Policy Crises: Based on the Record of Henry Kissinger's Hitherto Secret Telephone Conversations. New York: Simon & Schuster. ISBN 978-0-7432-4911-9.
- 2011. On China. New York: Penguin Press. ISBN 978-1-59420-271-1.
- 2014. World Order. New York: Penguin Press. ISBN 978-1-59420-614-6.

=== Other works ===
External videos
- Interview with Kissinger and Eric Schmidt on The Age of A.I., December 20, 2021, C-SPAN
- Interview with Kissinger on Leadership: Six Studies in World Strategy, July 28, 2022, C-SPAN

- 2021. The Age of AI: And Our Human Future. Boston: Little, Brown and Company. ISBN 978-0-316-27380-0. Co-authored with Eric Schmidt and Daniel P. Huttenlocher.
- 2022. Leadership: Six Studies in World Strategy. Penguin Books Ltd. ISBN 978-0-241-54200-2.
- 2024. Another book titled Genesis: Artificial Intelligence, Hope, and the Human Spirit was co-authored by Henry A. Kissinger, Eric Schmidt, and Craig Mundie and released by Little, Brown and Co.

=== Articles ===
- 1994. "Reflections on Containment," Foreign Affairs
- 1999. "Between the Old Left and the New Right," Foreign Affairs
- 2001. "The Pitfalls of Universal Jurisdiction," Foreign Affairs
- 2012. "The Future of U.S.-Chinese Relations," Foreign Affairs
- 2023. "The Path to AI Arms Control," Foreign Affairs (co-authored with Graham Allison)

== See also ==
- List of centenarians (politicians and civil servants)
- List of Jewish Nobel laureates
- List of United States secretaries of state
- List of Jewish United States Cabinet members
- List of foreign-born United States Cabinet members

== Notes ==
Political offices
| Preceded by Walt Rostow | United States National Security Advisor; 1969–1975 | Succeeded by Brent Scowcroft |
| Preceded by William Rogers | United States Secretary of State; 1973–1977 | Succeeded by Cyrus Vance |
Academic offices
| Preceded by Margaret Thatcher | Chancellor of the College of William & Mary; 2000–2005 | Succeeded by Sandra Day O'Connor |
Government offices
| New title | Chair of the 9/11 Commission; 2002 | Succeeded by Thomas Kean |
