= Joint Chiefs of Staff Readiness Test =

1969 US military test

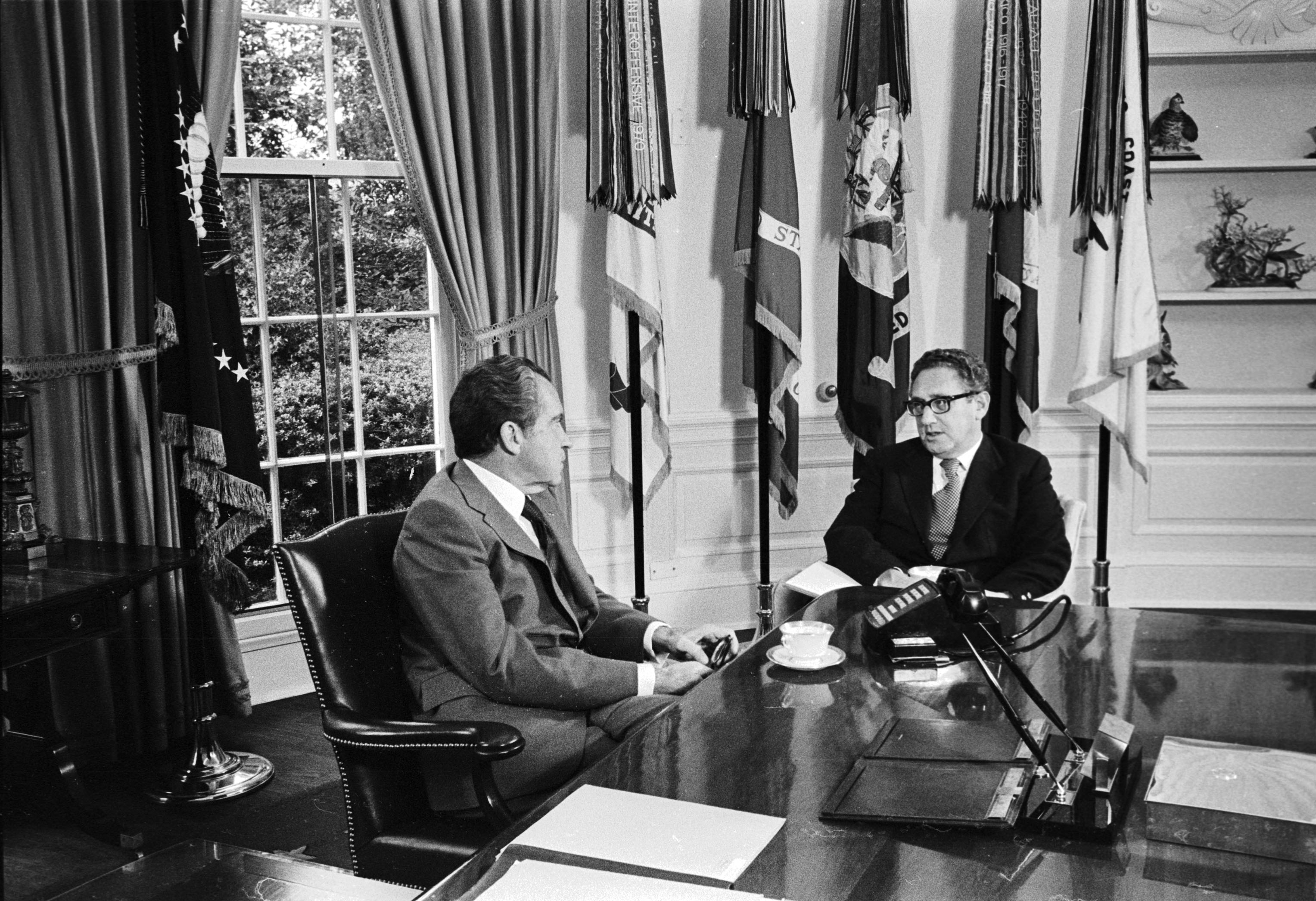
Richard Nixon (left) and Henry Kissinger (right) at the White House

The Joint Chiefs of Staff Readiness Test was a secret test and alert of U.S. military forces staged by the U.S. Department of Defense. It began on October 12, 1969, and consisted of a variety of military moves around the world, including activities by U.S. air and naval forces from the continental U.S. to the North Atlantic and from the Middle East to the Western Pacific.

The readiness test was carried out at the direction of President Richard Nixon and National Security Advisor Henry Kissinger, but even the most senior U.S. military leaders were not informed of the purpose of the alert. According to the U.S. Department of State, there are two main "after-the-fact explanations". First, the readiness test was the culmination of months of White House efforts to apply the "Madman theory" and related threats of force to help end the Vietnam War; Nixon and Kissinger hoped that the implied threat of force would make the Soviet and North Vietnamese leadership more cooperative in the negotiation of a Vietnam War settlement. Second, President Nixon ordered the Readiness Test in order to deter a possible Soviet nuclear strike against the People's Republic of China; this second interpretation is consistent with U.S. intelligence reports which indicated that the Soviet leadership was considering a preemptive strike against Chinese nuclear facilities. Researchers have also called the second interpretation logically the most likely one.

The Readiness Test culminated in a "Giant Lance" airborne alert involving nuclear-armed B-52 flights over northern Alaska. While the Soviet government was aware of the U.S.'s secret military activities, Nixon's and Kissinger's efforts did not convince them or have any discernible impact on the peace negotiations with North Vietnam in Paris. On the other hand, the Soviet abandoned its attack against China in October 1969 and, instead, began to engage in negotiations over border issues with China.

== Origins of the test ==
=== Contingency planning ===
Some of the measures taken during the JCS Readiness Test drew on earlier contingency planning. After the January 1966 B-52 crash in Palomares, Spain, the Strategic Air Command (SAC) began to look at alternatives to the continuous airborne alert posture that it had maintained since 1961. In 1967, SAC planners developed the Selective Air and Ground Alert (SEAGA), which they nicknamed "Giant Lance". Designed to be compatible with Single Integrated Operational Plan (SIOP) targeting and to permit greater dispersal of bombers and tankers in a crisis, SEAGA could provide decision-makers with a bomber force that could make an "instant response to tactical warning" or put forces on higher alert during periods of world tension. After the Thule Air Base B-52 crash on January 21, 1968, airborne alert was replaced with SEAGA.

=== "Show of Force" posture ===
Under SEAGA, strategic bombers remained on ground alert as they had since the 1950s. However, a key element of SEAGA was the "Show of Force" posture. This involved immediate launch of alert forces ("flush launch") with airborne and ground alert bombers switching positions at regular intervals for up to 30 days. The Show of Force posture would put airborne alert B-52 aircraft in a variety of "orbits," or positions, over the Arctic Circle, the North Atlantic, the Mediterranean, or the Pacific. SAC considered such a posture as a "visual deterrent": a demonstration to an adversary of a "national determination to resist with every available resource."

== Role in the Nixon Administration ==
=== Deterrence against Soviet's strike on China ===
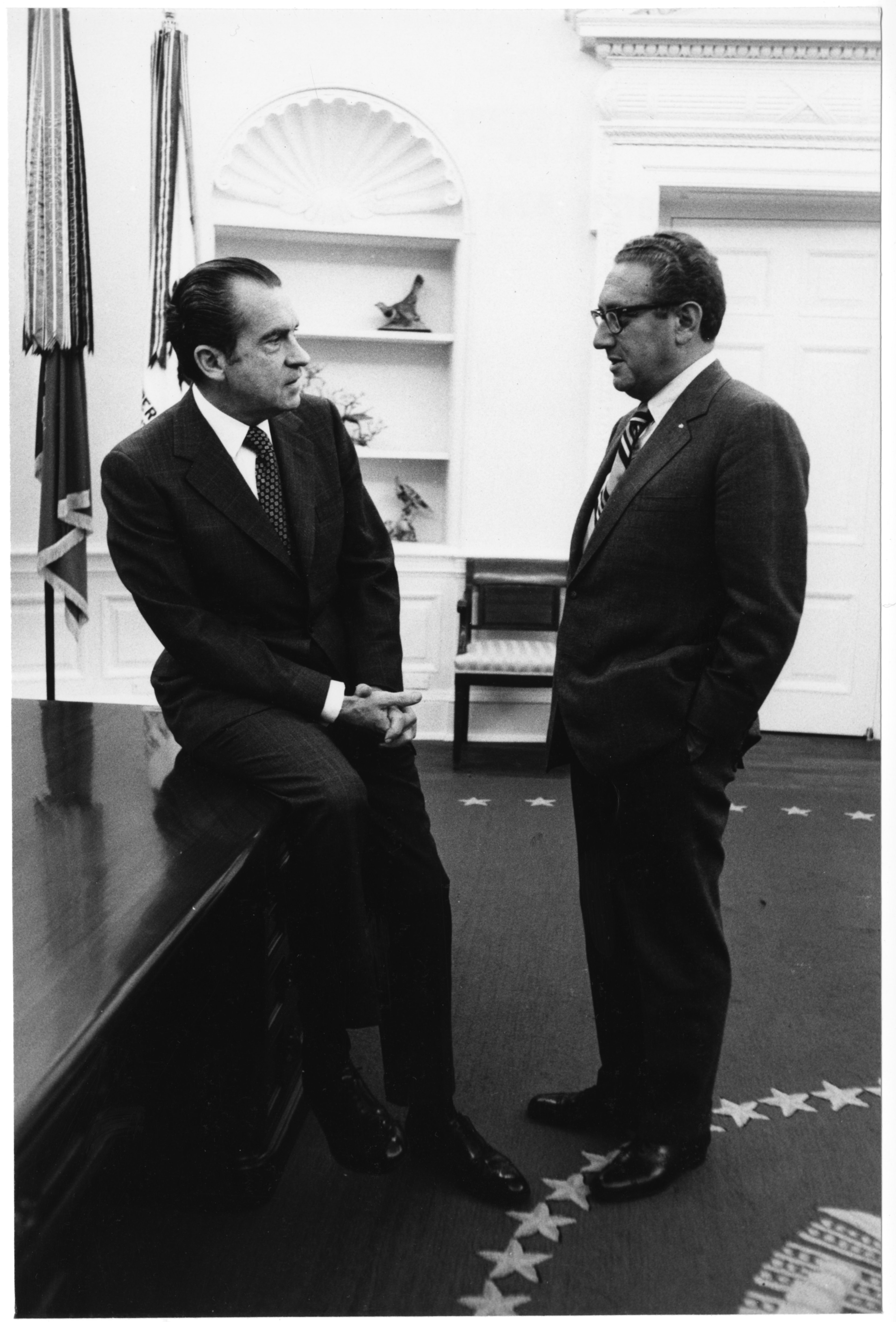
Richard Nixon (left) and Henry Kissinger (right) at the White House

After the Zhenbao Island incident in March 1969, the Soviet Union planned to launch a massive nuclear strike on the People's Republic of China (PRC). Soviet diplomat Arkady Shevchenko mentioned in his memoir that Andrei Grechko, Soviet's Minister of Defence at the time, called for "unrestricted use of the multimegaton bomb known in the West as the 'blockbuster'", in order to "once and for all to get rid of the Chinese threat". As a turning point during the Cold War, this crisis almost led to a major nuclear war, seven years after the Cuban missile crisis.

On August 18, 1969, Boris N. Davydov, the Second Secretary of the Soviet Embassy to the United States, brought up the idea of a Soviet attack on China's nuclear installations, during a luncheon in Washington. On August 20, Soviet ambassador Anatoly Dobrynin reportedly informed Henry Kissinger of Soviet's intention to launch nuclear strike on China. On August 21, the United States sent out a secret telegram to its embassies worldwide, warning that "a body of recent evidence concerning Soviet military activity suggests that Moscow may be preparing to take action against China in the near future", and that "the Soviets have set in motion an extensive series of measures" which could "permit them a variety of military options". Unusual Soviet military activity in the Far East, namely a procedure known as a "stand-down" of the Soviet air force (a prelude to a possible attack), was detected by the US intelligence in the late August.

The PRC soon entered the phase of war preparation. On September 16, Victor Louis, a Soviet journalist with KGB background, issued another warning via The Evening News of the United Kingdom that the Soviet might launch nuclear airstrike against China. In the late September 1969, both the Soviet Union and the PRC conducted nuclear tests, with China successfully conducting its first underground nuclear test on September 22. The Chinese leadership initially anticipated a Soviet attack on October 1, the National Day of PRC, but when the expected attack did not come, they soon received new classified intelligence, forming another anticipation of October 20 which was the scheduled starting day of border negotiations with the Soviets.

According to a number of sources, U.S. President Richard Nixon decided to intervene in the end, and on October 15, the Soviet side was informed that the United States would launch nuclear attack on approximately 130 cities in the Soviet Union once the latter began to attack China. The U.S. government confirmed that "the U.S. military, including its nuclear forces, secretly went on alert" in October 1969, which was the Joint Chiefs of Staff Readiness Test, and that Nixon indeed once considered using nuclear weapons. Eventually, the Soviet abandoned its attack on China.

Henry Kissinger wrote in his memoirs later, that the United States "raised our profile somewhat to make clear that we were not indifferent to these Soviet threats." On July 29, 1985, Time magazine published its interview with Nixon, who recalled that "Henry said, 'Can the U.S. allow the Soviet Union to jump the Chinese?'—that is, to take out their nuclear capability. We had to let the Soviets know we would not tolerate that." In his book On China, Kissinger further disclosed that after seeing "many documents published by the main parties, I now lean toward the view that the Soviet Union was much closer to a preemptive attack than we realized", and that the "uncertainty about American reactions" was a main reason why the Soviets postponed their action. Researchers and scholars have also speculated that the U.S. authorities might have ordered a nuclear alert in October 1969 in order to deter a Soviet nuclear or conventional attack on China. Such speculation, according to Scott Sagan and Jeremi Suri, "appears logically to be the most likely one".

=== Vietnam exit strategy ===
==== The "Madman Strategy" ====
One of the Nixon Administration's top priorities was ending the war in Vietnam. Nixon did not want the war to end his presidency — as it had Lyndon Johnson’s — and believed that it was essential to use threats of massive force to coerce North Vietnam into becoming more cooperative at the Paris Peace Talks. Nixon and Kissinger wanted to guarantee the Nguyễn Văn Thiệu regime in South Vietnam the support it needed to stay in power, or at least last long enough to survive — a "decent interval" or a "reasonable interval" — once the United States had withdrawn its forces from South Vietnam. Nixon was privately committed to what became known as the "Madman Strategy", which posited that threats of excessive force could make the Soviet government worry that the President was a madman who needed to be placated. Kissinger agreed with this approach and, like the President, optimistically believed that Soviet leadership had sufficient influence to compel North Vietnam to take a more conciliatory negotiating position, and that Soviet policy could be influenced by U.S. pressure. According to Kissinger, the U.S. "must worry the Soviets about the possibility that we are losing our patience and may get out of control." Several years into the administration, Kissinger privately said "the president’s strategy has been (in the mid-East crisis, in Vietnam, etc.) to 'push so many chips into the pot' that the other side will think we might be 'crazy' and might really go much further."

==== Threats of force ====
From the late winter to the spring and summer of 1969, Nixon and Kissinger made various low-level threats and feints to warn North Vietnam and the Soviet Union of the risk of escalation. The secret bombing of Cambodia was integral to this approach, with Kissinger justifying it in part as a "way to influence the Soviets." In addition, the White House supported a ruse to create apprehension that the United States was going to mine Haiphong Harbor by ordering the US Navy to conduct secret and elaborate mining exercises in Manila Bay, P.I. Finally, Kissinger sent a threatening statement to North Vietnamese negotiators through a French intermediary, informing them of the risk that the U.S. would take "measures of great consequence and force," using "any means necessary," if they did not accept U.S. negotiating positions.

==== Duck Hook ====
During the summer of 1969, Kissinger presided over contingency planning to escalate the war through bombing raids and mining operations. U.S. Navy planners developed a mining plan, code named Duck Hook, which was soon folded into ongoing work at the National Security Council and the Pentagon. With Kissinger's threats to North Vietnamese negotiators focusing on November 1, 1969, as a deadline, the escalation plans became known as the “November Option." Nixon and Kissinger, however, had overestimated Moscow's influence on Hanoi. Determined to keep their forces in the South and refusing to recognize the South Vietnamese regime, Hanoi ignored the threats and made no concessions.

While developing plans for military escalation, Kissinger's White House staff considered risky options such as ground incursions into North Vietnam and tactical nuclear weapons use, which did not survive further scrutiny. Subsequent planning focused on conventional military operations, with the Joint Chiefs of Staff directing military officials in Saigon and the Western Pacific to develop a parallel bombing-mining plan nicknamed "Pruning Knife". By late September, however, Nixon reluctantly set aside escalation proposals, to Kissinger's displeasure. With major national anti-war demonstrations scheduled for mid-October and mid-November, Nixon was concerned that major escalation could exacerbate civil unrest and produce "horrible results" domestically. Top advisers such as Secretary of Defense Melvin Laird shared those concerns, also observing that the U.S. could not point to any “provocative” action by North Vietnam to justify an attack.

==== Raising readiness levels ====
As an alternative to the November Option, Nixon chose to signal his anger toward Moscow through the application of the "madman" approach by raising military alert and readiness levels. Kissinger's military assistant, Colonel Alexander Haig, requested plans and proposals for higher readiness levels from Pentagon officials, which he and Kissinger compiled into a report for Nixon on measures to “convey the impression of increased US readiness to the Soviets.” Nixon and Kissinger may have seen this as a way to lend credibility to the prior warnings to Moscow and Hanoi. While the Pentagon's instructions to top commanders emphasized military measures that would be "discernible" to Moscow, they were "not to be threatening," seemingly to avoid sparking a crisis. Kissinger had written about threats and bluffs in the past and may have hoped that the Soviets perceived the readiness measures as a threat, even if they were only a bluff. Several days into the readiness test, on October 17, 1969, Kissinger explained to White House Chief of State H. R. Haldeman that the United States had all "sorts of signal-type activity going on around the world to jar Soviets + NVN." Nixon and Kissinger shared with only a few senior officials their purpose in ordering the readiness activities, although some SAC officers suspected that they had to do with Vietnam.

== Joint Chiefs of Staff Readiness Test ==
The Joint Chiefs of Staff Readiness Test was created by the Pentagon's Joint Chiefs of Staff at the request of the White House. The readiness test involved military operations around the world, including in the continental United States, the Atlantic, the Middle East, and the Western Pacific. Carried out between October 13 and 30, 1969, the activities included higher readiness levels for SAC bombers, tactical air, and air defenses, as well as a variety of naval maneuvers, from sudden movements of aircraft carriers and ballistic missile submarines to the shadowing of Soviet merchant ships sailing toward Haiphong. A master list of actions to be taken during the readiness test was developed by the Joint Chiefs after JCS Chairman Earle Wheeler canvassed military commands for suggestions. Some actions were to be taken almost immediately, and some later in October. The actions were to "reflect an increase in the intensity of signals received by the Soviets." For example, SAC stood down B-52 bombers at their bases, placing them on expanded ground alert with no flights for roughly a week. After briefly allowing flights, they reinstated the stand-down on October 23, 1969.

The U.S. Pacific Command took steps to "enhance SIOP forces" with the "maximum feasible" number of Polaris missile submarines at sea, to "increase surveillance" of Soviet ships heading toward North Vietnam, and to increase the readiness of tactical air and air defense missiles. The U.S. Atlantic Command undertook a variety of aircraft carrier maneuvers, such as the USS Yorktown (CV-10) cancelling a port visit so it could rendezvous with the USS Newport News (CA-148). The U.S. European Command had instructions to "selectively increase border surveillance" (on the East-West German border) and to increase intelligence gathering at the border, among other measures.

=== Operation Giant Lance ===
Among the measures to be taken by SAC were the SEAGA/Giant Lance "Show of Force Option". Implemented by the 92nd Strategic Aerospace Wing, it involved nuclear-armed B-52s in the "Eielson Orbit- East" (over northern Alaska) and the "maximum feasible number" of nuclear-armed SAC bombers "in the highest state of maintenance readiness." Beginning on October 27, 6 B-52s flew over Northern Alaska for eighteen hour stretches, each day for three days in a row, for a total of eighteen sorties. This was the first time that nuclear-armed airborne alert flights had been launched since the accident at Thule, Greenland in January 1968. It was one of the last major moves in the Readiness Test, which Joint Chiefs instructed the commands to end on October 30, 1969.

None of the JCS Readiness Test activities were announced and all were conducted in secret. Only actions that were most difficult to conceal — like the sudden departure of the aircraft carrier USS Yorktown (CV-10) from Rotterdam, leaving 200 baffled sailors behind — received media attention. Also difficult to keep secret were stand-downs at SAC bomber bases. Bases received phone calls from people in nearby residential areas curious as to why bomber flights suddenly stopped and then restarted.

== Impact ==
Higher U.S. alert levels and unusual military actions, even if not designed to be threatening, carried the risk that they could provoke a Soviet military reaction and an unwanted, spiraling crisis. To track Soviet military posture, early in the readiness test Kissinger tasked the intelligence agencies with monitoring Soviet reactions. As part of an "all source" intelligence watch, both the Central Intelligence Agency and the Defense Intelligence Agency (DIA) turned in reports, with DIA preparing a series, "Summary of Soviet Reactions to U.S. Operations." One of the DIA reports, dated October 28, 1969 and bearing Kissinger's initials, has been massively excised, likely because its contents drew from highly secret communications intelligence. This document and others in the "Special Intelligence" series are located in the Vietnam files at the Richard Nixon Presidential Library and Museum, which emphasizes the readiness test's connection to the Nixon White House's Vietnam strategy.

Evidence concerning the Soviet government's awareness of the JCS Readiness Test and its elements, such as the "Giant Lance" SEAGA operation, has yet to surface. As the readiness measures were relatively non-threatening, Soviet officials probably downplayed them. Years later, former Foreign Minister Andrei Gromyko recalled that "the Americans put forces on alert so often it is hard to know what it meant." Another Soviet diplomat, Aleksandr Kislov, stated, "Mr. Nixon used to exaggerate his intentions regularly" by using alerts, an approach that was the opposite of Moscow's, which was to "understate our military intentions." Given such perceptions, the Soviet government may have seen the October 1969 alert as the bluff that it was. Despite Nixon and Kissinger's hope that threats could persuade North Vietnamese negotiators to accept U.S. positions, Hanoi made no change in its approach. The North Vietnamese leadership believed that they would be able to reach an agreement with Washington by changing the facts on the ground in South Vietnam.

== See also ==
- Cuban Missile Crisis
- Nuclear close calls
- Deterrence theory
