= Nuclear close calls =

List of incidents which could have led to a nuclear exchange

A nuclear close call is an incident that might have led to at least one nuclear explosion, but did not. They can be split into intentional use and unintentional use close calls.

Intentional use close calls may occur during increased military tensions involving one or more nuclear states. They may be a threat made by the state, or an attack upon the state. They may also come from nuclear terrorism.

Unintentional use close calls may occur due to equipment failure. Common examples are strategic bombers accidentally dropping or crashing with nuclear bombs, or early warning systems mistaking phenomena such as weather events or non-nuclear rocket launches for an ICBM first strike and therefore recommending a second strike.

Though exact details on many nuclear close calls are hard to come by, the analysis of particular cases has highlighted the importance of a variety of factors in preventing accidents. At an international level, this includes the importance of context and outside mediation; at the national level, effectiveness in government communications, and involvement of key decision-makers; and, at the individual level, the decisive role of individuals in following intuition and prudent decision-making, often in violation of protocol.

A possible example of an accident that did result in a nuclear explosion is the 2019 Nyonoksa radiation accident in Russia.

Any nuclear exchange carries the possibility of rapid climate change, threatening global food production: nuclear famine.

Despite reduction of nuclear arms and lower tensions after the end of the Cold War, estimated nuclear warhead stockpiles total roughly 15,000 worldwide, with the United States and Russia holding 90% of the total.

== Intentional use close calls ==
Intentional close calls may occur during increased military tensions involving one or more nuclear states. They may be a threat made by the state, or an attack upon the state. They may also come from nuclear terrorism.

=== 1950–1953: Korean War ===
During the Korean War, the U.S. considered nuclear attacks on North Korea and Manchuria, in response to involvement from the People's Volunteer Army from China. Mark 4 nuclear bombs, lacking their fissile pits, were deployed to Guam and Okinawa. Boeing B-29 Superfortresses were stationed in Kadena Air Base, Okinawa, and flew practice bombing runs with dummy nuclear or conventional bombs against North Korean targets.

The U.S. also considered strikes on Soviet Air Force bases in the Russian Far East. The Artem air base was the most immediate.

=== 1954: First Indochina War ===
During the Battle of Dien Bien Phu, at the request of the French, the U.S. considered tactical nuclear weapons use against the Viet Minh. U.S. strategic bombers stationed in the Philippines or Okinawa, as well as carrier aircraft in the Seventh Fleet, were considered for a strike using three tactical nuclear bombs, possibly Mark 7s.

=== 1956: Suez Crisis ===
During the Suez Crisis, the North American Aerospace Defense Command (NORAD) received a number of simultaneous reports, including unidentified aircraft over Turkey, Soviet MiG-15 fighters over Syria, a downed British Canberra medium bomber, and unexpected maneuvers by the Soviet Black Sea Fleet through the Dardanelles that appeared to signal a Soviet offensive. Considering previous Soviet threats to use conventional missiles against France and the United Kingdom, U.S. forces believed these events could trigger a NATO nuclear strike against the Soviet Union. In fact, all reports of Soviet action turned out to be erroneous, misinterpreted, or exaggerated. The perceived threat was due to a coincidental combination of events, including a wedge of swans over Turkey, a fighter escort for Syrian President Shukri al-Quwatli returning from Moscow, a British bomber brought down by mechanical issues, and scheduled exercises of the Soviet fleet.

=== 1958: Second Taiwan Strait Crisis ===
U.S. Secretary of State Christian Herter characterized the Second Taiwan Strait Crisis as "the first serious nuclear crisis". In this conflict, the People's Republic of China (PRC) shelled the islands of Kinmen (Quemoy) and the Matsu Islands along the east coast of mainland China (in the Taiwan Strait) in an attempt to probe the extent of the United States military defense of Taiwan's sovereign territory. This was an ultimately failed preemptive strike prior to an attempted invasion of Taiwan, where the Republic of China's (ROC) military forces and political apparatuses, known as the Kuomintang (KMT), had been exiled since the end of the Chinese Civil War in 1949. A naval battle also took place around Dongding Island when the ROC Navy repelled an attempted amphibious landing by the PRC Navy.

=== 1962: Cuban Missile Crisis ===
==== Soviet nuclear weapons in Cuba ====
Under Operation Anadyr, the Soviet Union deployed both strategic and tactical nuclear weapons in Cuba, totalling 158 warheads. Of these, 80 were for use by the 9K52 Luna-M nuclear rocket artillery/short-range ballistic missile system, and 12 were for use by the FKR-1 cruise missile. At least one unit of the latter was targeted at the U.S. Guantanamo Bay Naval Base on the island of Cuba.

==== U.S. false alarm at interceptor airbase ====
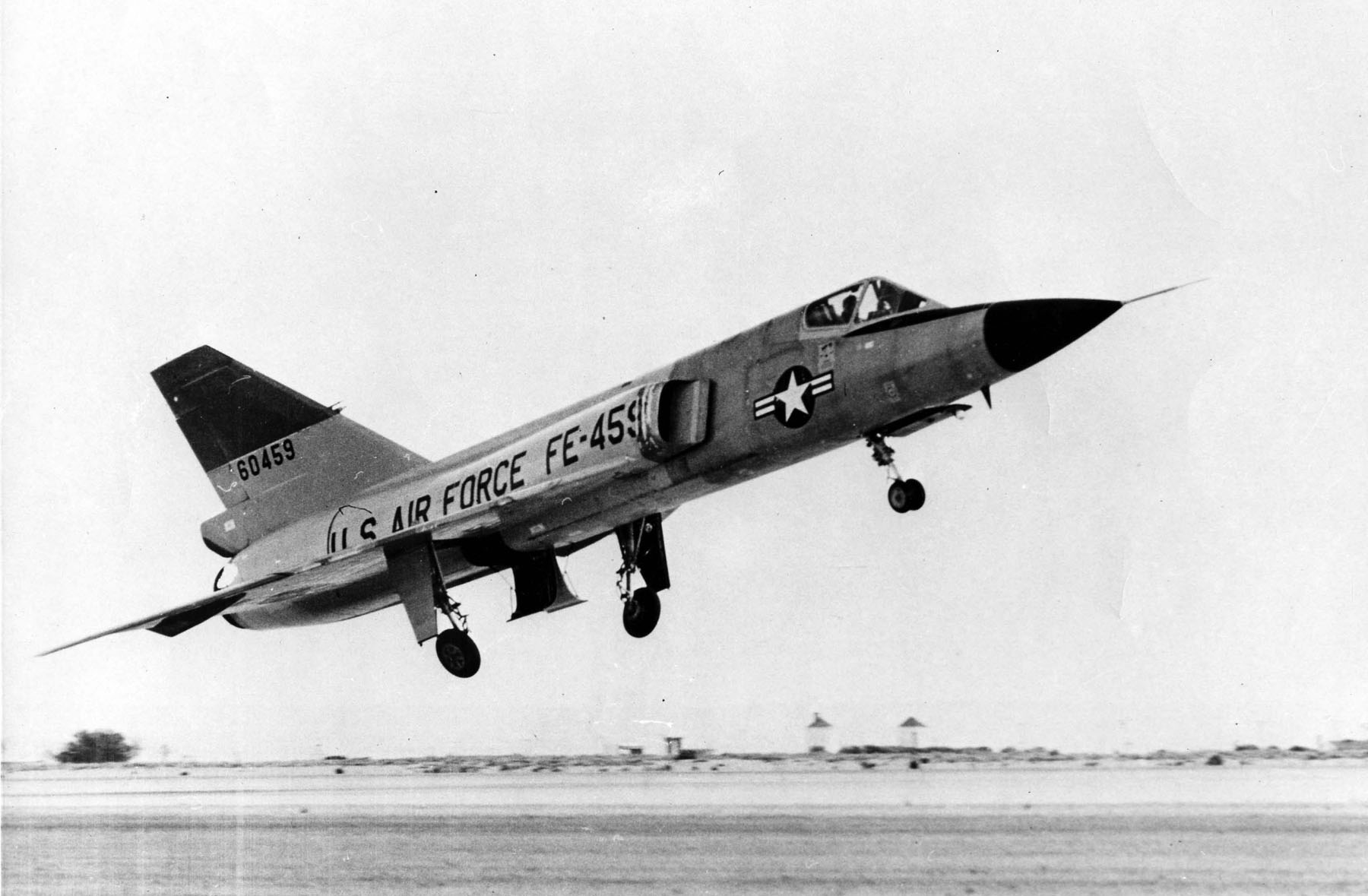
An F-106A during takeoff

During the Cuban Missile Crisis, United States military planners expected that sabotage operations might precede any nuclear first strike by the Soviet Union. Around midnight on 25 October 1962, a guard at the Duluth Sector Direction Center in Minnesota saw a figure climbing the security fence. He shot at it and activated the sabotage alarm, which automatically set off similar alarms at other bases in the region. At Volk Field in Wisconsin, a faulty alarm system caused the klaxon to sound instead, which ordered Air Defense Command (ADC) nuclear-armed F-106A interceptors into the air. The pilots had been told there would be no practice alert drills and, according to political scientist Scott Sagan, "fully believed that a nuclear war was starting". Before the planes were able to take off, the base commander contacted Duluth and learned of the error. An officer in the command center drove his car onto the runway, flashing his lights and signaling to the aircraft to stop. The intruder was discovered to be a bear.

Sagan writes that the incident raised the dangerous possibility of an ADC interceptor accidentally shooting down a Strategic Air Command (SAC) bomber. Interceptor crews had not been given full information by SAC of plans to move bombers to dispersal bases (such as Volk Field) or the classified routes flown by bombers on continuous alert as part of Operation Chrome Dome. Declassified ADC documents later revealed that "the incident led to changes in the alert Klaxon system [...] to prevent a recurrence".

==== Soviet averted launch of nuclear torpedo ====
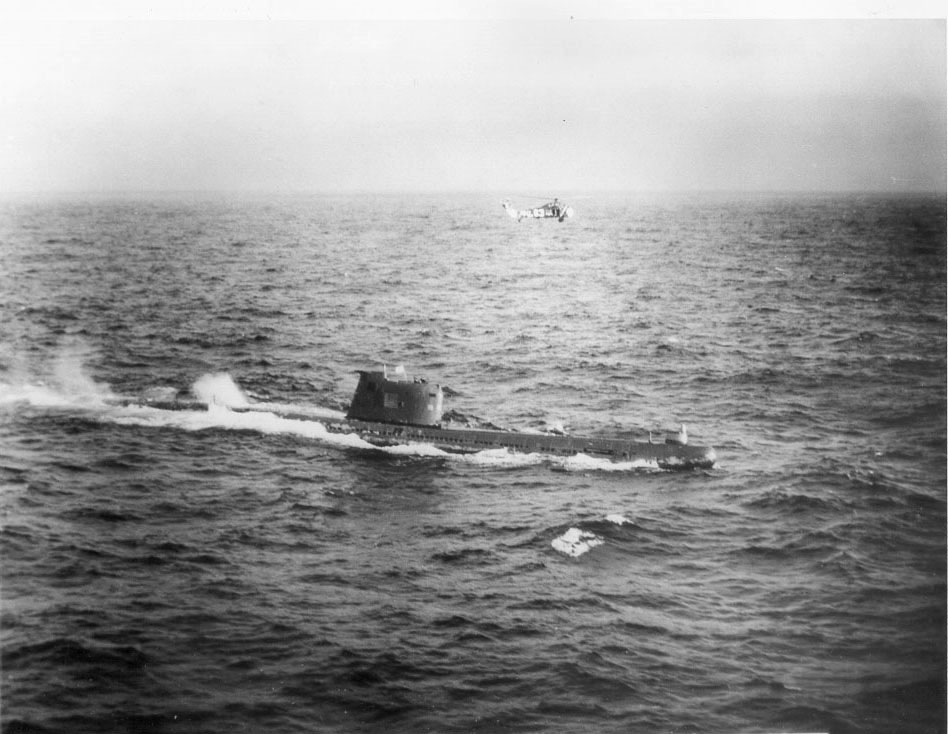
B-59 near Cuba with a U.S. Navy helicopter circling above, c. October 28–29, 1962

At the height of the Cuban Missile Crisis, Soviet patrol submarine B-59 almost launched a nuclear torpedo while under harassment by American naval forces on October 27. One of several vessels surrounded by American destroyers near Cuba, B-59 dove to avoid detection and was unable to communicate with Moscow for a number of days. USS Beale began dropping practice depth charges to signal B-59 to surface; however, the captain of the Soviet submarine and its zampolit (political officer) took these to be real depth charges. With low batteries affecting the submarine's life-support systems and unable to make contact with Moscow, the commander of B-59 feared that war had already begun and ordered the use of a 10-kiloton nuclear torpedo against the American fleet. The zampolit agreed, but the chief of staff of the flotilla (second in command of the flotilla) Vasily Arkhipov refused permission to launch. He convinced the captain to calm down, surface, and make contact with Moscow for new orders.

==== U.S. loss of ICBM launch authority ====
According to Scott Sagan, also on 27 October, at Malmstrom Air Force Base in Montana, officers of Strategic Air Command jerry-rigged their launch system on a Minuteman ICBM, bypassing standard procedure and obtaining an independent launch authority.

==== U.S. scramble of interceptors ====
Additionally on 27 October, an American U-2 spy plane was shot down over Cuba, resulting in the death of pilot Major Rudolf Anderson of the United States Air Force (USAF), and another U-2 flown by Captain Charles Maultsby, USAF, from Eielson Air Force Base, Alaska, strayed 300 miles (480 km) into Soviet airspace. Despite orders to avoid Soviet airspace by at least 100 miles (160 km), a navigational error caused by the aurora borealis took the U-2 over the Chukotka Peninsula, causing Soviet MiG interceptors to scramble and pursue the aircraft. American F-102A interceptors armed with GAR-11 Falcon nuclear air-to-air missiles (each with a 0.25 kiloton yield) were then scrambled to escort the U-2 into friendly airspace. Individual pilots were capable of arming and launching their missiles. The incident remained secret for many years.

=== 1968–1969: Vietnam War ===
During the Vietnam War, the United States military developed at least two contingency plans relating to nuclear weapons in Vietnam. In early 1968, the Fracture Jaw plan called for the deployment of tactical nuclear weapons to South Vietnam during the Battle of Khe Sanh, and was approved by General William Westmoreland. It was vetoed by President Lyndon B. Johnson, partially out of fear of causing the People's Republic of China to enter the conflict. In late 1969, the Nixon White House developed the Duck Hook, which involved major escalation of the U.S. war effort via bombing and mining campaigns. The plan was abandoned by Nixon on 1 November due to opposition from the cabinet, lowered public war support, and uncertain effectiveness.

=== 1969: DPRK shootdown of U.S. EWAC aircraft ===
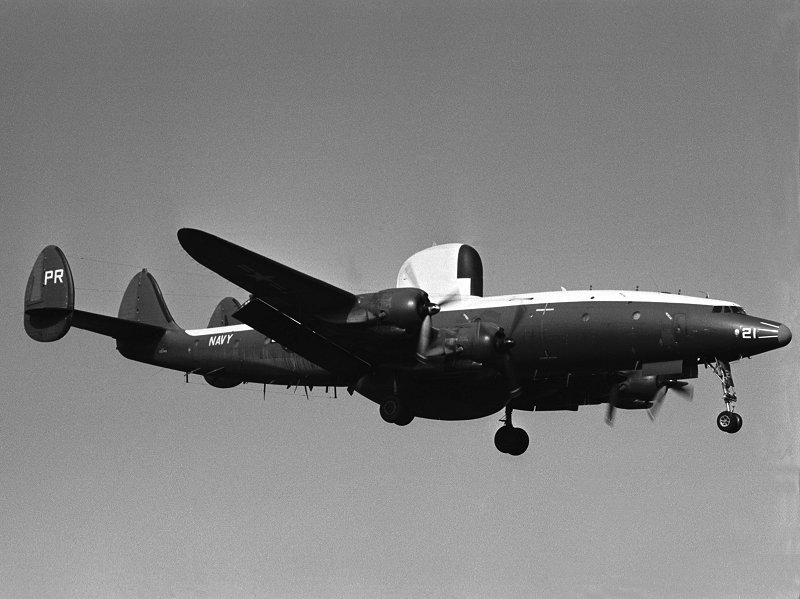
The EC-121 shot down in 1969, seen here c. 1960

A United States Lockheed EC-121 Warning Star early warning aircraft was shot down by a Democratic People's Republic of Korea (DPRK, i.e. North Korea) MiG-21, killing all 31 servicemen aboard. F-4 Phantom fighter-bomber jets at Kunsan Air Base were ordered to load B61 nuclear bombs and began preparations for a nuclear strike against the DPRK. The attack was to include the airfield from which the North Koreans had attacked the U.S. aircraft. After a few hours, the order to stand down was given and the jets never took off. Reportedly, President Richard Nixon was drunk when he gave the order for a nuclear attack against the DPRK. The order to stand down was given on the advice of Secretary of State Henry Kissinger.

=== 1969: Sino-Soviet conflict ===
In 1969, following the border conflict Battle of Zhenbao Island in March, the USSR considered a massive nuclear attack on China, targeting cities and nuclear facilities. It made military activity in the Russian Far East, and informed its allies and the United States of this potential attack. The Chinese government and archives were evacuated from Beijing while the People's Liberation Army scattered from its bases. The crisis abated when U.S. Secretary of State Henry Kissinger informed the Soviet Union that an attack on China would be met by a U.S. nuclear attack on 130 Soviet cities. According to the U.S. Department of State, one of the two main "after-the-fact explanations" for the Joint Chiefs of Staff Readiness Test conducted by the U.S. military in October 1969 was to deter a possible Soviet nuclear strike against the People's Republic of China.

=== 1973: Yom Kippur War ===
During the Yom Kippur War, Israeli officials panicked that the Arab invasion force would overrun Israel after the Syrian Army nearly achieved a breakout in the Golan Heights, and the U.S. government rebuffed Israel's request for an emergency airlift. According to a former CIA official, Defense Minister Moshe Dayan requested and received authorization from Israeli prime minister Golda Meir to arm 13 Jericho missiles and 8 F-4 Phantom II fighter jets with nuclear warheads. The missile launchers were located at Sdot Micha Airbase, while the fighter jets were placed on 24-hour notice at Tel Nof Airbase. The missiles were said to be aimed at the Arab military headquarters in Cairo and Damascus.

The United States discovered Israel's nuclear deployment after a Lockheed SR-71 Blackbird reconnaissance aircraft spotted the missiles, and it began an airlift the same day. After the UN Security Council imposed a ceasefire, conflict resumed when the Israel Defense Force (IDF) moved to encircle the Egyptian Third Army. According to former U.S. State Department officials, the leader of the USSR, Leonid Brezhnev, threatened to deploy the Soviet Airborne Forces against Israeli forces, and the U.S. Armed Forces were placed at DEFCON 3. Israel also redeployed its nuclear weapons. While DEFCON 3 was still in effect, mechanics repairing the alarm system at Kincheloe Air Force Base in Michigan accidentally activated it and nearly scrambled the B-52 bombers at the base before the duty officer declared a false alarm. The crisis finally ended when Prime Minister Meir halted all military action. Declassified Israeli documents have not confirmed these allegations directly, but have confirmed that Israel was willing to use "drastic means" to win the war.

=== 1983: Able Archer 83 NATO exercise ===
Able Archer 83 was a command post exercise carried out by NATO military forces and political leaders between 7 and 11 November 1983. The exercise simulated a Soviet conventional attack on European NATO forces three days before the start of the exercise (D-3), transitioning to a large-scale chemical war (D-1), and on day one (D+1) of the exercise, NATO forces sought political guidance on the use of nuclear weapons to stem the Soviet advance which was approved by political leaders. NATO then began simulating preparations for a transition to nuclear war.

These simulations included 170 radio-silent flights to air lift 19,000 U.S. troops to Europe, regularly shifting military commands to avoid nuclear attack, the use of new nuclear weapon release procedures, the use of nuclear Command, Control, and Communications (C3) networks for passing nuclear orders, the moving of NATO forces in Europe through each of the alert phases from DEFCON 5 to DEFCON 1, and the participation of political leaders like Margaret Thatcher, Helmut Kohl and Ronald Reagan.

The issue was worsened by leaders referring to B-52 sorties as "nuclear strikes", by the increased use of encrypted diplomatic channels between the U.S. and UK, and by the nuclear attack false alarm in September.

In response, Soviet nuclear-capable aircraft were fueled and armed ready to launch on the runway, and ICBMs were brought up to alert. Soviet leaders believed the exercise was a ruse to cover NATO preparations for a nuclear first strike and frantically sent a telegram to its residencies seeking information on NATO preparations for an attack. The exercise closely aligned with Soviet timeline estimations that a NATO first strike would take 7 to 10 days to execute from the political decision being made.

Soviet forces stood down after 11 November when the exercise ended. NATO was unaware of the complete Soviet response until British intelligence asset Oleg Gordievsky passed on the information.

=== 1991: Gulf War ===
==== Coalition nuclear weapons ====
The Coalition of the Gulf War included the nuclear-armed countries of the United States and the United Kingdom. They both deployed nuclear weapons to the region during the conflict, ostensibly to allow retaliation in the event of an Iraqi chemical weapons attack. The United States deployed 1,000 tactical weapons to the region, with 300 land-based weapons in Turkey, and 700 aboard warships in the Persian Gulf region. The United Kingdom also deployed five nuclear-capable vessels probably carrying between eight and sixteen nuclear weapons. Western chemical weapons were also mobilized to the region.

Threats of nuclear use by coalition officials came from public statements, private communication with Iraqi officials, and leaked communications. Among them, U.S. Secretary of Defense Dick Cheney, General Norman Schwarzkopf Jr., and UK Prime Minister Margaret Thatcher all emphasized that the use of weapons of mass destruction (WMD) against coalition forces would lead to a nuclear attack on Iraq.

On January 7, 1991, The Washington Post reported that the U.S. military had ruled out the use of nuclear or chemical weapons in the conflict. Cheney had requested Chairman of the Joint Chiefs of Staff Colin Powell to produce nuclear strike options against Iraq. Powell later wrote that "To do serious damage to just one armored division dispersed in the desert would require a considerable number of small tactical nuclear weapons…. If I had had any doubts before about the practicality of nukes in the field of battle, this report clinched them".

On January 9, 1991, U.S. Secretary of State James Baker delivered to Iraqi Foreign Minister Tariq Aziz a letter carrying a formal threat, presumably nuclear retaliation, to the following actions:

1. If Saddam Hussein used chemical or biological weapons
2. If Saddam Hussein destroyed the Kuwaiti oil fields
3. If Saddam Hussein supported terrorists

Baker warned that the U.S. had "the means to exact vengeance" in the event of an Iraqi resort to WMD. After the war, the Defense Intelligence Agency credited these threats with deterring Iraq from launching chemical attacks on coalition forces.

Researcher Hans M. Kristensen has argued that it is unclear if U.S. nuclear threats were fully understood by Iraqi officials, that they were more concerned by the threat of regime change, and that their destruction of the Kuwaiti oil fields indicates deterrence was not successful.

==== Israeli nuclear weapons ====
During the Persian Gulf War, Ba'athist Iraq launched Scud missiles at Saudi Arabia and Israel and possessed a large cache of WMD in the form of chemical weapons. This, along with Saddam Hussein's previous threat to "burn half of Israel" with chemical weapons, led to fears that Saddam Hussein would order the use of the chemical weapons against the U.S.-led coalition or against Israel. Israeli prime minister Yitzhak Shamir and Israeli Air Force Commander-in-Chief Avihu Ben-Nun both warned that an Iraqi chemical attack would trigger "massive retaliation", implying that Israel would retaliate with nuclear weapons. Saddam Hussein had a contingency plan to launch WMD-armed warheads against Tel Aviv in the event that he became cut off from the Iraqi Armed Forces leadership or if the Iraqi government was about to collapse, which almost certainly would have triggered a retaliatory nuclear response from Israel. Saddam Hussein ultimately never deemed this option necessary because he never felt as if his government was about to collapse.

=== India-Pakistan conflict (1990s/2000s, 2019, 2025) ===
There have been several nuclear scares in the past regarding military clashes between Pakistan and India over fears it could quickly escalate out of control into a full-scale nuclear war between the two nuclear-armed powers, as both India and Pakistan have produced and access to large stockpiles of nuclear weapons. The possibility a conventional war could escalate into a nuclear one was raised several times during the series of multiple military standoffs that have taken place between them since the Kargil War in 1999. During one such incident that had broken out between them after the terrorist attack on the Indian Parliament in 2001 that India suspected had been state-sponsored by Pakistan's Inter-Services Intelligence, various statements on this subject were made by Indian and Pakistani officials during the conflict, mainly concerning a no first use policy. Indian External Affairs Minister Jaswant Singh said on 5 June that India would not use nuclear weapons first, while Musharraf said on 5 June he would not renounce Pakistan's right to use nuclear weapons first. There was also concern that a 6 June 2002 asteroid explosion over Earth, known as the Eastern Mediterranean Event, could have caused a nuclear conflict had it exploded over India or Pakistan.

In one such series of skirmishes in 2023, Mike Pompeo, who served as United States Secretary of State in 2019, claimed that U.S. diplomacy prevented heightened tensions between India and Pakistan from sparking a nuclear war. According to Pompeo, he was informed by Sushma Swaraj in February 2019 that the Indian government believed Pakistan was preparing a nuclear attack, and that India was preparing an escalatory response. Pompeo claimed that he and then National Security Advisor John Bolton spoke with then Pakistani Army Chief Qamar Javed Bajwa in "the tiny secure communications facility in our hotel", who was under the equivalent impression about Indian nuclear preparations. The situation was de-escalated as U.S. intermediaries informed both countries that no nuclear attack preparations were occurring. Neither the Indian Ministry of External Affairs nor Pakistani Foreign Office commented on Pompeo's claims.

In another state of conflict that took place between them in 2025, The New York Times reported that explosions at the Nur Khan air base heightened U.S. concern that the conflict could "quickly go nuclear." The base lies close to the headquarters of Pakistan's Strategic Plans Division, which oversees the country's nuclear arsenal. On 14 May, Reuters reported that Indian strikes on Nur Khan air base had caused concern among U.S. officials, who became seriously worried that the conflict could spiral out of control. Christopher Clary, an associate professor at the University at Albany, said: "So, an attack on the facility may have been perceived as more dangerous than India intended — and the two sides should not conclude that it is possible to have a conflict without it going nuclear.

According to The New York Times, local media in Pakistan reported that Prime Minister Shehbaz Sharif had summoned a meeting of the National Command Authority (NCA), the body responsible for decisions regarding the use of nuclear weapons, although Pakistan's defence minister denied that any such meeting took place. Clary, citing CNN's chronology, said that U.S. fears of escalation had already intensified before reports of the NCA meeting. Both India's Chief of Defence Staff, General Anil Chauhan, and Pakistan's Chairman Joint Chiefs of Staff Committee, General Sahir Shamshad Mirza, confirmed that at no time during the conflict any of the nations had considered the use of nuclear weapons.

=== 2017–2018: North Korea crisis ===
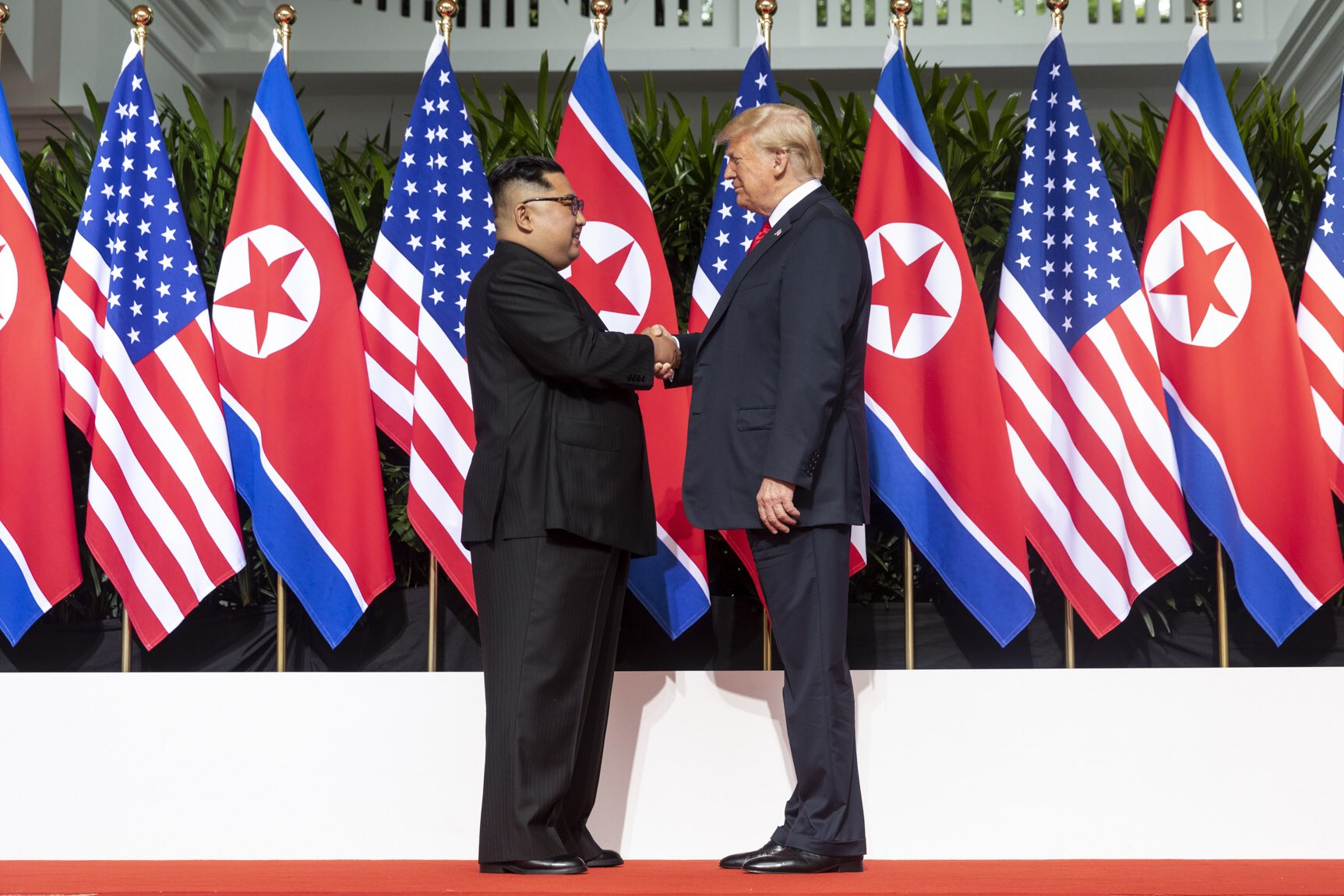
Kim Jong-un (left) and Donald Trump in June 2018

Between 2017 and 2018, the United States and North Korea, most particularly U.S. president Donald Trump and North Korean supreme leader Kim Jong-un, exchanged threats that have been described as on the brink of nuclear war. In August 2017, Trump warned that North Korea would be met with "fire and fury, the likes of which the world has never seen". During his speech in 2017 at the United Nations General Assembly, he warned that if the United States were forced to defend itself, they would have no choice but to "totally destroy North Korea". North Korea, in response, has referred to Trump as a "dotard", stated that he will "pay dearly", and accused the U.S. of "declaring war". In January 2018, Trump also tweeted that his country has a "bigger nuclear button" than North Korea.

In January 2018, it was reported that Trump withdrew Victor Cha as a pick to be U.S. Ambassador to South Korea over his opposition to launch a limited strike at North Korea. The withdrawal sparked major concerns for North Korean experts that the U.S. was seriously considering war with North Korea.

The crisis has been described as the "Cuban Missile Crisis in slow motion". In Van Jackson's book On the Brink: Trump, Kim, and the Threat of Nuclear War, he stated that the United States was close as ever to World War III between 2017 and early 2018. Trump also reportedly considered evacuating Americans from South Korea despite warnings that such a move could lead to war. Reports also emerged in 2023 that Trump was considering the use of nuclear weapons against North Korea in 2017.

=== 2022–present: Russian invasion of Ukraine ===
Russia has threatened the use of nuclear weapons throughout its invasion of Ukraine, characterized as nuclear blackmail.

In late 2022, tensions over Russian nuclear use reached a high point. Russian Foreign Minister Sergey Lavrov implied nuclear weapons could be used to defend annexed Ukrainian territories. Russian officials, including Russian defense minister Sergei Shoigu, publicly and privately accused Ukraine of preparing to use a radioactive dirty bomb on Ukrainian territory. A tweet by the Russian Ministry of Defence, purportedly showing evidence of a Ukrainian dirty bomb in production, was debunked as a collection of old and unrelated photos. On 24 October, U.S. NSC official John Kirby stated that there was no evidence Russia was preparing a dirty bomb strike. At Ukraine's request, the United Nations sent an International Atomic Energy Agency (IAEA) investigation to Ukraine, which found no evidence of a dirty bomb being developed or any other undeclared nuclear activity. U.S. officials feared that those allegations by Russia may be a confirmation of it preparing for a nuclear strike on Ukraine, using dirty bomb allegations or a false flag attack as a pretext. The U.S., as reported by CNN, has "prepared 'rigorously' for potential Russian nuclear strike in Ukraine". It also engaged U.S. diplomats, as well as asked other countries, namely China and India, to engage diplomatically to persuade Russia to avoid nuclear escalation.

On 25 March 2023, Russian president Vladimir Putin announced plans to install Russian tactical nuclear weapons in Belarus.

On 19 November 2024, Putin signed a decree allowing Russia to use nuclear weapons in response to conventional attacks by a non-nuclear state supported by a nuclear power, lowering the threshold for a nuclear strike in response to a possible conventional attack.

On 21 November 2024, Russia used a conventionally armed multiple independently targetable reentry vehicle (MIRV) system, on the Oreshnik intermediate-range ballistic missile to attack the Ukrainian city of Dnipro, marking their first usage in combat. The MIRV system was developed by multiple nations for nuclear strategic missiles.

On 7 December 2024, Russia and Belarus signed an agreement offering security guarantees to Belarus including nuclear security and the possible use of Russian nuclear weapons to repel aggressions. Two days later, Belarusian president Alexander Lukashenko confirmed the presence of Russian nuclear weapons in Belarus, including Russia's Oreshnik missile system.

On 4 May 2025, in an interview to mark his 25 years of power in Russia, Putin remarked that "he hoped that there would be no need to use nuclear weapons" to bring the Russian invasion of Ukraine "to its logical conclusion".

== Unintentional close calls ==
Unintentional use close calls may occur due to equipment failure. Common examples are strategic bombers accidentally dropping or crashing with nuclear bombs, or early warning systems mistaking phenomena such as weather events or non-nuclear rocket launches for an ICBM first strike and therefore recommending a second strike.

=== 1957: U.S. accidental bomb drop in New Mexico ===
A B-36 accidentally dropped a bomb just south of Albuquerque, New Mexico. Due to safety measures, the plutonium core was not mounted to the bomb at the time but rather stored elsewhere in the plane, preventing a nuclear detonation. The conventional explosives created a 7.6 m (25 ft)-wide crater on impact.

=== 1958: U.S. accidental bomb drop in Savannah, Georgia ===
A bomb was mistakenly dropped by a U.S. Air Force Boeing B-47E-LM Stratojet near Savannah, Georgia, when a man in the bomb bay area grabbed the emergency release pin by accident. Similar to the 1957 incident, safety precautions meant that the plutonium was not mounted to the bomb but rather stored elsewhere on the plane at the time.

=== 1960: U.S. false alarm from moonrise ===
Radar equipment in Thule, Greenland, mistakenly interpreted a moonrise over Norway as a large-scale Soviet missile launch. Upon receiving a report of the supposed attack, NORAD went on high alert. However, doubts about the authenticity of the attack arose due to the presence of Soviet leader Nikita Khrushchev in New York City as head of the USSR's United Nations delegation.

=== 1961: U.S. strategic bomber crash in North Carolina ===
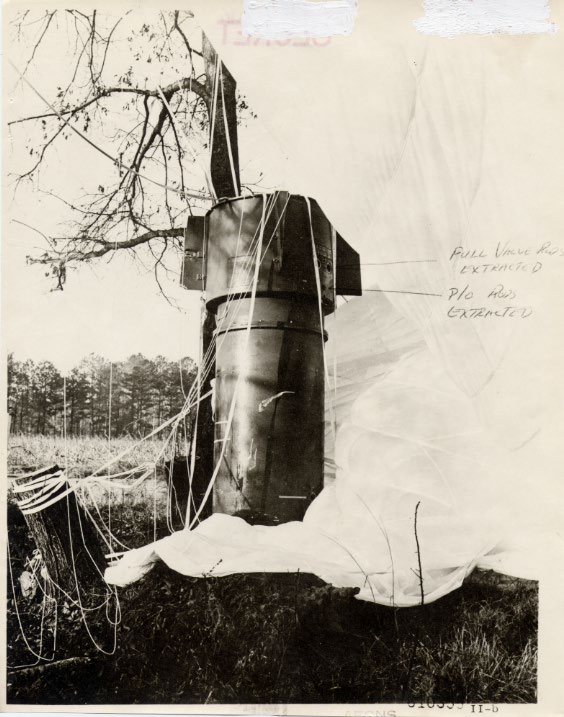
One of Mark 39 nuclear bombs after the 1961 incident near Goldsboro, North Carolina

A B-52 Stratofortress carrying two 3–4-megaton Mark 39 nuclear bombs broke up in mid-air near Goldsboro, North Carolina, dropping its nuclear payload in the process. The pilot in command, Walter Scott Tulloch, ordered the crew to eject at 9,000 feet (2,700 m). Five crewmen successfully ejected or bailed out of the aircraft and landed safely, another ejected but did not survive the landing, and two died in the crash.

Information declassified in 2013 showed that "only a single switch prevented the ... bomb from detonating and spreading fire and destruction over a wide area." An expert evaluation written on 22 October 1969 by Parker F. Jones, the supervisor of the nuclear weapons safety department at Sandia National Laboratories, reported that "one simple, dynamo-technology, low voltage switch stood between the United States and a major catastrophe", and that it "seems credible" that a short circuit in the Arm line during a mid-air breakup of the aircraft "could" have resulted in a nuclear explosion.

=== 1961: U.S. strategic bomber crash in California ===
A B-52 Stratofortress carrying two nuclear weapons experienced a catastrophic decompression, eventually forcing the crew to eject. The crewless plane crashed 15 miles west of Yuba City, California. The bombs did not detonate due to safety features.

=== 1961: U.S. false alarm from communications failure ===
Staff at the Strategic Air Command Headquarters (SAC HQ) simultaneously lost contact with NORAD and multiple Ballistic Missile Early Warning System sites. Since these communication lines were designed to be redundant and independent from one another, the communications failure was interpreted as either a very unlikely coincidence or a coordinated attack. SAC HQ prepared the entire ready force for takeoff before already overhead aircraft confirmed that there did not appear to be an attack. It was later found that the failure of a single relay station in Colorado was the sole cause of the communications problem.

=== 1962: U.S. mistaken order during Cuban Missile Crisis ===
According to a technician who served there, a mistaken order was issued by Kadena Air Base in Okinawa to nuclear missile sites in Okinawa to launch all their nuclear missiles. None were launched. A team responsible for four missiles at Bolo Airfield in Yomitan reported that the order's codes were in order, but the local officer in charge did not trust the order, partly because only one of their four missiles was targeted on Russia, and he saw no logic why missiles would be launched against China too, and because readiness was at DEFCON 2, not DEFCON 1. Others serving there at the time have made statements saying they doubt this incident ever happened.

=== 1964: U.S. strategic bomber crash in Maryland ===
A B-52 carrying nuclear bombs was severely damaged while flying in turbulence over Western Pennsylvania. The plane crashed in Garrett County, Maryland, at Savage River State Forest. Having completed an Operation Chrome Dome mission, the plane was traveling from Massachusetts to Georgia carrying two nuclear bombs. Reports on the condition of the bombs varied, with Department of Defense (DoD) saying they were "relatively intact" while Sandia National Laboratories engineers saying they "broke apart" and that it was too risky to hastily move them. Within two days, the bombs were retrieved and taken to a local airport for transportation to Air Force facilities. The pilot ordered the crew to eject from the plane when it lost control. Three crew members died in the crash or due to exposure in the snowy winter conditions.

=== 1965: U.K. false alarm due to misunderstood test plan ===
In 1965, Flight Lieutenant Tony Dobbie was serving as a duty officer at the Bomber Command Operations Centre (BCOC) at RAF High Wycombe following the disbandment of No. 15 Squadron.

During a shift, BCOC received notification that the Ballistic Missile Early Warning System (BMEWS) station at RAF Fylingdales was scheduled to run a system test. Fylingdales requested that the BCOC wall display remain set to "AUTOMATIC" rather than "TEST" while running the test tape. Because automatic mode caused test data to render as genuine threat alerts, the BCOC display registered an incoming missile strike marked as "REAL."

Unaware that the display reflected a test run, the duty controller instructed Dobbie to issue "Alert State 02" without an exercise code prefix. This order brought the Royal Air Force Quick Reaction Alert (QRA) V-bomber force to runway readiness. Upon detecting the unauthorized alert broadcast, staff at RAF Fylingdales disconnected the test tape and notified BCOC, allowing a stand-down order to be issued before aircraft were launched.

=== 1965: U.S. false alarm from blackout computer errors ===
The Command Center of the Office of Emergency Planning went on full alert after a massive power outage in the northeastern United States. Several nuclear bomb detectors—used to distinguish between regular power outages and power outages caused by a nuclear blast—near major U.S. cities malfunctioned due to circuit errors, creating the illusion of a nuclear attack.

=== 1965: U.S. attack aircraft falling off carrier ===
During a training exercise in the Philippine Sea, a nuclear-armed Douglas A-4 Skyhawk attack aircraft fell off the side of the aircraft carrier USS Ticonderoga. The jet, pilot and weapon were not recovered.

=== 1966: U.S. strategic bomber crash in Spain ===
A B-52G bomber and KC-135 tanker crashed over the Mediterranean Sea. The bomber was carrying nuclear weapons at the time. While the bombs did not detonate, they did contaminate the area with radioactive material.

=== 1966: French false alarm from weather (likely) ===
In the early days of the French Strategic Air Forces, electrical transmissions were disrupted due to a thunderstorm, causing a wartime takeoff order to be displayed. The French Air Force launched a Mirage IV with an AN-11 atomic bomb. The crew was called back by radio, but did not respond, as required by procedure. When they reached their refueling zone, they were unable to find the supply plane, forcing them to abort their mission, turn back, and land.

=== 1967: U.S. false alarm from weather ===
A powerful solar flare accompanied by a coronal mass ejection interfered with multiple NORAD radars over the Northern Hemisphere. These radars included three Ballistic Missile Early Warning Systems (BMEWS) that had been recently upgraded, and only resumed operation eight days prior to the flare. This interference was initially interpreted as intentional jamming of the radars by the Soviets, and thus an act of war. A nuclear bomber counterstrike was nearly launched by the United States. The Strategic Air Command had prepared to launch fighters before NORAD alerted them of the solar flare.

=== 1968: U.S. strategic bomber crash in Greenland ===
A fire broke out on a nuclear-armed B-52 bomber just off Greenland, and the plane crashed into the sea without causing a detonation.

=== 1979: U.S. false alarm from computer training scenario ===
Computer errors at the NORAD headquarters in Peterson Air Force Base, the Strategic Air Command command post in Offutt Air Force Base, the National Military Command Center in the Pentagon, and the Alternate National Military Command Center in the Raven Rock Mountain Complex led to alarm and full preparation for a nonexistent large-scale Soviet attack. NORAD notified National Security Advisor Zbigniew Brzezinski that the Soviet Union had launched 250 ballistic missiles with a trajectory for the United States, stating that a decision to retaliate would need to be made by the president within three to seven minutes. NORAD computers then placed the number of incoming missiles at 2,200. Strategic Air Command was notified, and nuclear bombers prepared for takeoff. Within six to seven minutes of the initial response, PAVE PAWS satellite and radar systems were able to confirm that the attack was a false alarm.

Congress quickly learned of the incident because Senator Charles H. Percy was present at the NORAD headquarters during the panic. A General Accounting Office investigation found that a training scenario was inadvertently loaded into an operational computer in the Cheyenne Mountain Complex. Commenting on the incident, U.S. State Department adviser Marshall Shulman stated that "false alerts of this kind are not a rare occurrence. There is a complacency about handling them that disturbs me." Soviet General Secretary Leonid Brezhnev composed a letter to U.S. President Jimmy Carter that the false alarm was "fraught with a tremendous danger" and "I think you will agree with me that there should be no errors in such matters." In the months following the incident, there were three more false alarms at NORAD, two of them caused by faulty computer chips. One of them forced the National Emergency Airborne Command Post to taxi into position at Andrews Air Force Base.

=== 1980: U.S. false alarm from Soviet missile exercise ===
A Soviet submarine near the Kuril Islands launched four missiles as part of a training exercise. American early warning sensors determined one of the four to be aimed towards the United States. In response, the United States convened officials for a threat assessment conference, at which point it was determined to not be a threat and the situation was resolved.

=== 1980: Explosion at U.S. missile silo ===
An explosion in Arkansas ripped the doors off a silo and launched part of a nuclear missile out of the structure. The warhead landed 30m away, but safety features prevented either a detonation or release of radioactive material. The incident caused one death and 21 injuries, and sparked a congressional inquiry.

=== 1983: Soviet false alarm from weather (likely) ===
Several weeks after the downing of Korean Air Lines Flight 007 over Soviet airspace, a satellite early warning system near Moscow reported the launch of one American Minuteman ICBM. Soon after, it reported that five missiles had been launched. Convinced that a real American offensive would involve many more missiles, Lieutenant Colonel Stanislav Petrov of the Air Defense Forces refused to acknowledge the threat as legitimate and continued to convince his superiors that it was a false alarm until this could be confirmed by ground radar.

=== 1991: Tornado at U.S. strategic bomber airbase ===
On April 26, 1991, a large tornado touched down southwest of the city of Wichita, Kansas, heading towards the city of Andover. As the tornado approached Andover, it struck the McConnell Air Force Base, where it narrowly missed ten lined up Rockwell B-1 Lancers, two of them armed with nuclear warheads.

=== 1995: Russian false alarm from Norwegian research rocket ===
Russian President Boris Yeltsin became the first world leader to activate the Russian nuclear briefcase after Russian radar systems detected the launch of what was later determined to be a Norwegian Black Brant XII research rocket being used to study the northern lights. Russian ballistic missile submarines were put on alert in preparation for a possible retaliatory strike. When it became clear the rocket did not pose a threat to Russia and was not part of a larger attack, the alarm was cancelled. Russia was, in fact, one of a number of countries earlier informed of the launch; however, the information had not reached the Russian radar operators.

== See also ==
- Broken Arrow (nuclear)
- Cold War II
- Doomsday Clock
- Indo-Pakistani wars and conflicts
- Korean conflict
- List of military nuclear accidents
- Mutual assured destruction
- Nuclear and radiation accidents and incidents
- Nuclear blackmail
- Nuclear terrorism
- Nuclear winter
- Sino-Soviet border conflict
- Vulnerability of nuclear plants to attack
- World War III
