= Operation Giant Lance =

1969 secret U.S. nuclear alert operation

Operation "Giant Lance"
- Part of the Cold War
Date	10–30 October 1969
Location	Over Arctic Ocean
Result	Soviet Union deterred from conducting nuclear strikes on China, demonstrating tacit Sino-American alliance.

Belligerents
United States; Nuclear umbrella: China	Soviet Union

Commanders and leaders
(United States) Richard Nixon	(Soviet Union) Leonid Brezhnev

Operation Giant Lance was a secret U.S. nuclear alert operation by the United States that the Strategic Air Command carried out in late October 1969. Giant Lance was one component of a multi-pronged military exercise, the Joint Chiefs of Staff Readiness Test that the Joint Chiefs developed and carried out during October 1969 in response to White House orders. On 10 October 1969, on the advice of National Security Advisor Henry Kissinger, U.S. President Richard Nixon issued the order for the readiness test that led to Giant Lance.

Preparations were made to send a squadron of eighteen B-52s of the 92nd Strategic Aerospace Wing loaded with nuclear weapons to fly over northern Alaska in the direction of the Soviet Union, in sorties of 6 bombers at a time. The squadron took off on 27 October and flew towards the Soviet Union. Actions were designed to be detectable by the Soviets. Nixon terminated the operation on October 30.

According to the U.S. Department of State, there are two main "after-the-fact explanations" regarding the purpose of the Joint Chiefs of Staff Readiness Test: one was to convince the Soviets that Nixon was willing to resort to nuclear war in order to win the Vietnam War, the other was to deter Soviet's possible nuclear attack against the People's Republic of China. In the first explanation, the Readiness Test was part of Nixon's madman theory, and its details remained unknown to the public until Freedom of Information Act requests in the 2000s revealed documents about the operation. On the other hand, the second interpretation is consistent with U.S. intelligence reports which indicated that the Soviet leadership was considering a preemptive strike against Chinese nuclear facilities, and in October 1969 the Soviet indeed abandoned its attack against China. Researchers have also called the second interpretation logically the most likely one.

== Background ==
=== Soviet's nuclear threat towards China ===
After the Zhenbao Island incident in March 1969, the Soviet Union planned to launch a massive nuclear strike on the People's Republic of China. Soviet diplomat Arkady Shevchenko mentioned in his memoir that "the Soviet leadership had come close to using nuclear arms on China"; he further mentioned that Andrei Grechko, Soviet's Minister of Defence at the time, called for "unrestricted use of the multimegaton bomb known in the West as the 'blockbuster'", in order to "once and for all to get rid of the Chinese threat". As a turning point during the Cold War, this crisis almost led to a nuclear war, seven years after the Cuban missile crisis.

=== State of the Vietnam War ===
Vietnam War tensions were high and were a major driver of Nixon's decision to initiate the operation. The war was one of the primary challenges Nixon sought to address on becoming president, and led to him devising a plan to both end the war and gain international and domestic credibility for the United States as a result. By launching Operation Giant Lance, Nixon aimed to increase war tensions by raising the United States' nuclear threat through a "show of force" alert. These operations acted as a prequel to Nixon's eventual Operation Duck Hook, which was declassified in 2005. The primary goal of these operations was to pressure the Soviets to get their North Vietnamese ally to agree to peace terms favorable to the United States.

=== Preparation ===
Chairman of the Joint Chiefs of Staff Earle Wheeler ordered the operation as a part of the Joint Chiefs of Staff Readiness Test On 27 October 1969, eighteen B-52 bomber aircraft began the operation, accompanied by KC-135 tankers to refuel and support the extended patrol of the squadron. The bombers flew in sorties of 6 bombers at a time. The U.S. Strategic Air Command (SAC) was used to deploy the aircraft from air bases both in California and Washington State in secrecy. The bombers were checked throughout the day, standing by for immediate deployment.

== Purpose ==
Even the most senior U.S. military leaders were not informed of the purpose of the Joint Chiefs of Staff Readiness Test, during and after the alert. The operation was intended to be a precautionary measure, boasting operational readiness in case of military retaliation from either East Asia or Russia.

According to the U.S. Department of State, there are two main "after-the-fact explanations" regarding the purpose of the Joint Chiefs of Staff Readiness Test. In the first interpretation, the operation's intended goal was to directly support Operation Duck Hook as a part of the "show of force" alert; Nixon believed that this would coerce Moscow and Hanoi into a peace treaty through the Paris peace talks with the Soviets, on terms that were advantageous to the United States. In the second interpretation, the outcome of the operation was thought to have deterred Soviet's attack against China and promoted the credibility of the United States intervention in the Sino-Soviet conflict to its general public in the war. Researchers have also called the second interpretation logically the most likely one.

=== Deterrence against Soviet's strike on China ===
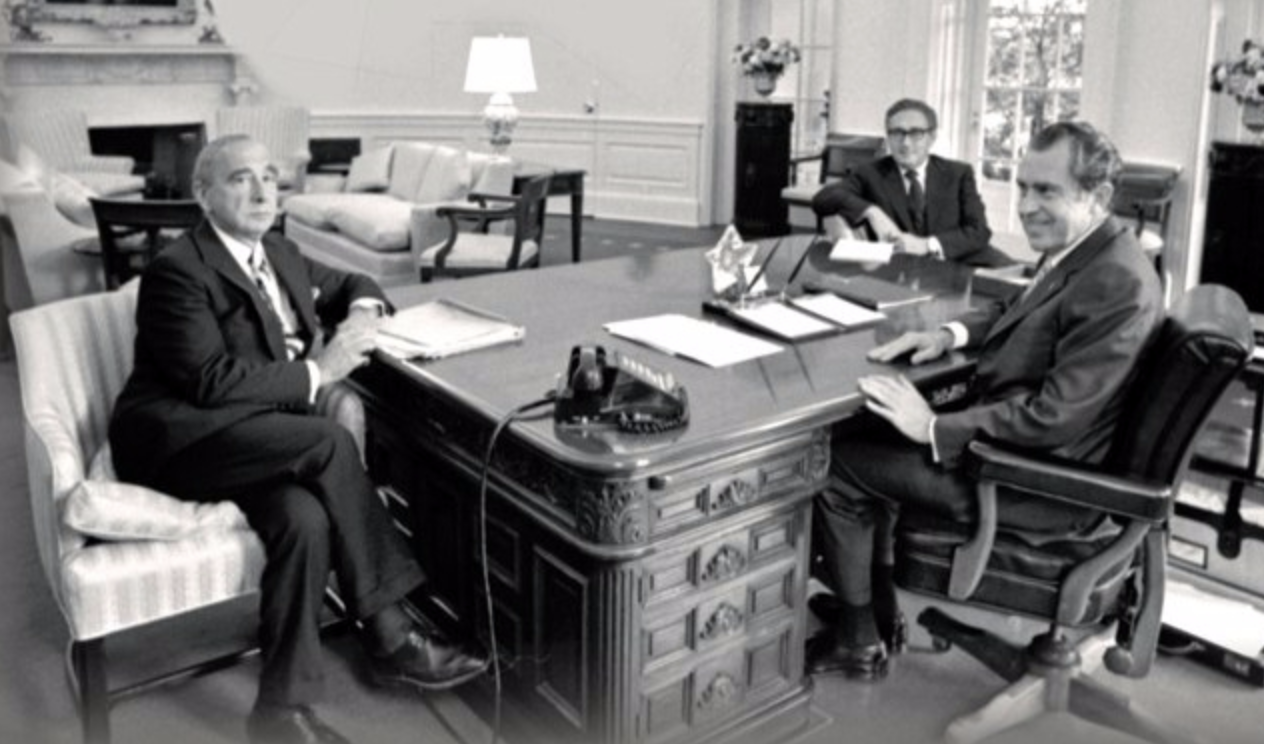
From left to right: Fritz G. A. Kraemer, Richard Nixon, and Henry Kissinger (White House, January 1970).

According to a number of sources, U.S. President Richard Nixon decided to intervene in the nuclear crisis between the Soviet Union and the People's Republic of China, and on October 15, 1969, the Soviet side was informed that the United States would launch nuclear attack on approximately 130 cities in the Soviet Union once the latter began to attack China. The U.S. government confirmed that "the U.S. military, including its nuclear forces, secretly went on alert" in October 1969, which was the Joint Chiefs of Staff Readiness Test, and that Nixon indeed once considered using nuclear weapons. Eventually, the Soviet Union abandoned its attack on China.

Henry Kissinger wrote in his memoirs later, that the United States "raised our profile somewhat to make clear that we were not indifferent to these Soviet threats." In his book On China, Kissinger further disclosed that after seeing "many documents published by the main parties, I now lean toward the view that the Soviet Union was much closer to a preemptive attack than we realized", and that the "uncertainty about American reactions" was a main reason why the Soviets postponed their action. On July 29, 1985, Time magazine published its interview with Nixon, who recalled that "Henry said, 'Can the U.S. allow the Soviet Union to jump the Chinese?'—that is, to take out their nuclear capability. We had to let the Soviets know we would not tolerate that." Researchers and scholars have also speculated that the U.S. authorities might have ordered a nuclear alert in October 1969 in order to deter a Soviet nuclear or conventional attack on China.

=== Vietnam War ===
According to one interpretation, the purpose of Operation Giant Lance and the Joint Chiefs of Staff Readiness Test of which it was a component was to intimidate the foreign contenders in the Vietnam War, primarily the Soviets, through a world-wide alert of U.S. nuclear and non-nuclear forces. By using seemingly irrational actions as a part of Nixon's madman diplomacy, he aimed to push both the Soviet and the Vietnamese to end the war on favourable terms. The squadron of eighteen B-52 bomber aircraft was to patrol the Northern polar ice cap to survey the frozen terrain whilst armed with nuclear weaponry. The patrols consisted of eighteen-hour long vigils, which were intended to appear as suspicious movements by the U.S. These movements were kept secret from the public, whilst also remaining intentionally detectable to the Soviet Union's intelligence systems.

==== Madman theory ====
President Richard Nixon was infamous for radical measures as part of his diplomacy. The radicality of sending eighteen armed bombers on patrol was designed to pressure foreign powers by displaying extreme military aggression. Nixon told Henry Kissinger, the national security advisor, that he was willing to use nuclear weapons in order to end the war. Following so-called madman theory, Nixon would often take diplomatic options that seemed irrational even to the United States' own authorities. The idea was to make it impossible for foreign powers to determine Nixon's motives or predict his actions, giving him a unique strategic advantage. This diplomacy, coupled with Nixon's decision to raise the nuclear alert, served as an indirect threat as the Soviets would not be able to understand his actions.

Nixon used this unpredictable diplomacy in a failed attempt to end the war in Vietnam, creating the impression he was willing to take desperate measures including using the United States' nuclear weapons. These actions would also enhance Nixon's reputation as a tough and "mad" leader. The intention was to cause the North Vietnamese and the Soviets to believe that he was an irrational leader, capable of escalating the nuclear threat. The policy failed to produce the concessions desired by the United States.

Nixon's "madman" diplomacy was in effect briefly during the Vietnam War, amplified by the numerous "show of force" operations. Although this diplomacy could have been seen by opposing states as a bluff, the risk of uncertainty to them was much larger than the risk to the United States. Ultimately, Nixon possessed an advantage as the US could gauge the effectiveness of its threats based on the reactions of the Soviets and the Vietnamese.

== Implications ==
=== Effects of the operation ===
The operation did not directly cause any obvious, significant change due to its cancellation; the impact it may have had on the Soviets or the Vietnamese cannot be accurately measured. The operation was terminated on October 30 suddenly without any known reason. The abrupt halt to the operation may have been due to the fact that the Soviets did not show any significant changes in their actions, which may mean that the Soviets suspected Nixon of bluffing. However, some historians have argued that the sudden withdrawal of the SAC's squadron was an intentional effort to display the maneuverability and freedom the US possessed when it came to nuclear warfare.

Operation Giant Lance was intended to jar foreign forces into favourable diplomatic agreements to end the war, to avoid Nixon ordering Operation Duck Hook. Despite the operation ending as a bluff tactic, the operation served to add credibility both to Nixon's madman threats and the proactiveness of the U.S. However this may not have been successful due to the large anti-war movement at the time, which tended to discourage nuclear operations. Seymour Hersh believed that the operation also served as an adjunct to Operation Duck Hook, a proposed mining and bombing operation against North Vietnam.

The Soviets showed no clear reaction in response to the Giant Lance patrols. Whilst there may not have been a direct response to the operation, there was a reaction from Soviet intelligence: a sudden heightened nuclear alert. This was the goal of the operation: to make the operation visible to Soviet intelligence whilst hiding it from the American public. The Soviets may have seen Nixon's move simply as a bluff. In October 1973, a Soviet official exclaimed that "Mr. Nixon used to exaggerate his intentions regularly. He used alerts and leaks to do this", which may have caused the U.S. operational threat to be ignored.

=== Perception of U.S. nuclear threat ===
Although both Moscow and Hanoi did not show any reaction to Operation Giant Lance and the Joint Chiefs of Staff Readiness Test, the uncertainty of Nixon's nuclear power posed a significant threat. Nixon's continuous nuclear threat towards Hanoi was undermined by the anti-war sentiment on U.S. home soil. This implied to Hanoi that the U.S. did not wish for further war, or to risk nuclear warfare. The heightened fear of nuclear warfare caused a shared parity of nuclear avoidance across all participants in the war. Neither side wanted a military confrontation that would escalate to that level.

There also existed the danger that excessive reliance on the nuclear threat in times of war would cause other governments to begin to accept this as the norm. Nuclear fear might bring the possibility of increased nuclear use. Continual development of nuclear technology and reliance thereon would inevitably lead to increasing paranoia. Military escalation could lead to “the threat that leaves something to chance”.
