= Margaret A. Hickey =

American journalist

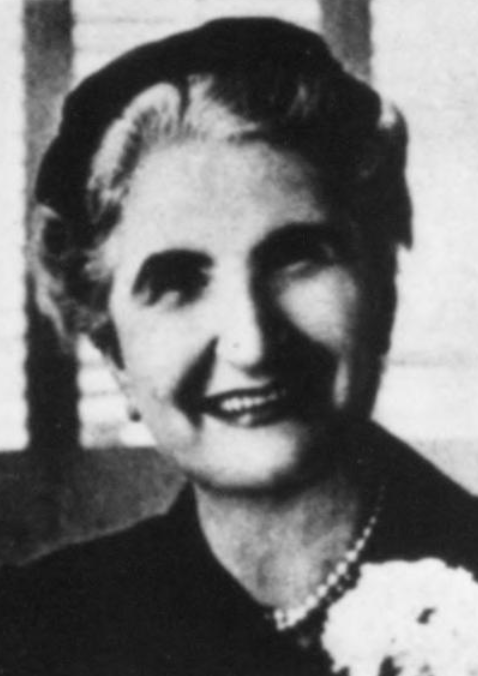
- Margaret A. Hickey, from a 1962 publication of the United States federal government
- Born: Margaret Ann Hickey; March 14, 1902; Kansas City, Missouri, U.S.
- Died: December 7, 1994 (aged 92); Tucson, Arizona, U.S.
- Occupations: Lawyer, journalist, activist

Margaret Ann Hickey (March 14, 1902 – December 7, 1994) was an American attorney, journalist, women's right's activist, and active member in government affairs between 1950 and 1975. She served as a prominent role model for women. She dedicated her career to serving those in need. She is most known for her roles of leadership in her service work, highlighted by her role as a chairman of the Commission on the Status of Women in 1961. She used her career as an attorney and journalist to help solve issues with poverty and women's rights.

== Early childhood and education ==
Margaret A. Hickey was born on March 14, 1902, in Kansas City, Missouri, to Elizabeth Wynne and Charles Hickey. Charles Hickey, who lived in Paris, France, at the time, served on the Foreign Service as a U.S. diplomat in Europe and the Ottoman Empire until World War I. The family bounced around several outposts in the Ottoman Empire prior to the war. Her family was forced to move back to the United States in 1914 due to World War I. After making that transition, Elizabeth Wynne worked in favor of the suffrage movement in Kansas City, which she included her children on as well. As a young girl, she made banners for suffragist parades. This exposure helped Margaret Hickey develop her interest in fighting for women's rights. In her late teens, she actively worked for the peace movement in regards to World War I.

In 1921, Hickey dropped out of college so she could work for the Kansas City Star as a reporter. She began working with influential business women involved in the National Federation of Business and Professional Women. Hickey, 20 years old at the time, was fascinated by these prominent women and this led her to enroll in the University of Kansas City Law School. There she pledged Kappa Beta Phi, a legal sorority for women. She received LLB degree from Kansas City University Law School (later University of Missouri) in 1928.

== Career ==
After graduating from law school, Margaret Hickey declined offers from multiple firms in Kansas City and St. Louis to open up her own office as a private practice. In her early career, Hickey was heavily Influenced by fellow lawyers Florence E. Allen and Lena Madesin Phillips. She worked primarily in poverty law, due to the depression of the 1920s. In 1933, Hickey established the Margaret Hickey School for Secretaries at Delmar and Skinker in St. Louis. Her school became a long term success, which led Hickey to not change her last name when marrying Joseph Strubinger in 1935.

She later gave up her private practice work as a lawyer to focus on the school. Hickey served on the advisory committee to the Social Security Board in the 1930s. She then went on to serve on an advisory committee for the Office of Emergency Planning, which led to her role on the War Manpower Commission. In 1942, she was suggested to Women's Advisory Committee of War Manpower Commission by Secretary of Labor Frances Perkins. She served as a chairman to this committee from 1942 to 1945. As chairman, she presided over a group of 14 women who advised on the most effective use of women workers in the war effort. Hickey was frustrated by the lack of progress they made in regards to the amount of potential competent women had. This committee dealt with issues involved in recruiting women into the wartime economy. In this position, she was given the opportunity to travel the country and speaking to audiences. She argued that women needed more college seats in order to progress. Her message to women was that in order for there to be meaningful change, women must leave the kitchen and enter the factory. This position made Margaret Hickey a prominent national figure and role model for women. In August 1944 she declared that the nation's "magnificent war production" was due to the "hidden army" of women working for victory.

That same year she was elected president of the National Federation of Business and Professional Women, a group she sought after as a young woman. She served in this position for two years, and remained honorary president thereafter. In 1946, Hickey traveled to Paris to work on the human rights section of the UN charter with Eleanor Roosevelt. The document the committee drafted is now known as the Universal Declaration of Human Rights. That year, she also went back to journalism and joined the Ladies Home Journal, a successful wartime magazine stationed in Philadelphia, Pennsylvania. She received the Ben Franklin Award for Distinguished Public Service Journalism in 1953 from the city of Philadelphia. In 1961, Hickey was appointed by President John F. Kennedy as a chairman of the United Nations Commission on the Status of Women. She primarily worked on federal employment policies. In 1968, she sold her school for secretaries, which is now named Hickey College.

Over the course of her career, she was appointed by six presidents to lead national committees, some of which are as follows: Voluntary Foreign Aid Committee, White House Conference on Education, National Commission on the Status of Women, Committee on Federal Employment Policies and Practices, Citizens Council on the Status of Women. Margaret Hickey had built up a bit of national prominence throughout her career. Because of that she was in high demand as a public speaker. She spent her final 25 years working as a public speaker.

=== Red Cross ===
Margaret Hickey volunteered to work for the Red Cross and YWCA throughout her life. In 1931, she began running her own class to help train unemployed women with credentials or experience. The federal government took over this program in 1933. Hickey began volunteering for the Red Cross in 1946. The following year, she served on the Board of Governors for six years, and then again for six years in 1955. In 1960 she served as the Deputy to Chairman E. Roland Harriman for the next thirteen years. For the Red Cross she also served as the Vice Chairman of the humanitarian law commission of the international congress. In 1966 she served as a chairman to the Organizing Committee for International Conference on Social Welfare. Hickey became a leader to those suffering from oppression and poverty. She was in positions and on committees to be a catalyst of real change for those who she represented.

== Personal life ==
Hickey married Joseph T. Strubinger in 1935; Strubinger died in 1973. Hickey died in Tucson, Arizona in 1994, aged 92 years.
