= Madman theory =

Feature of U.S. president Richard Nixon's foreign policy

- 1969–1974
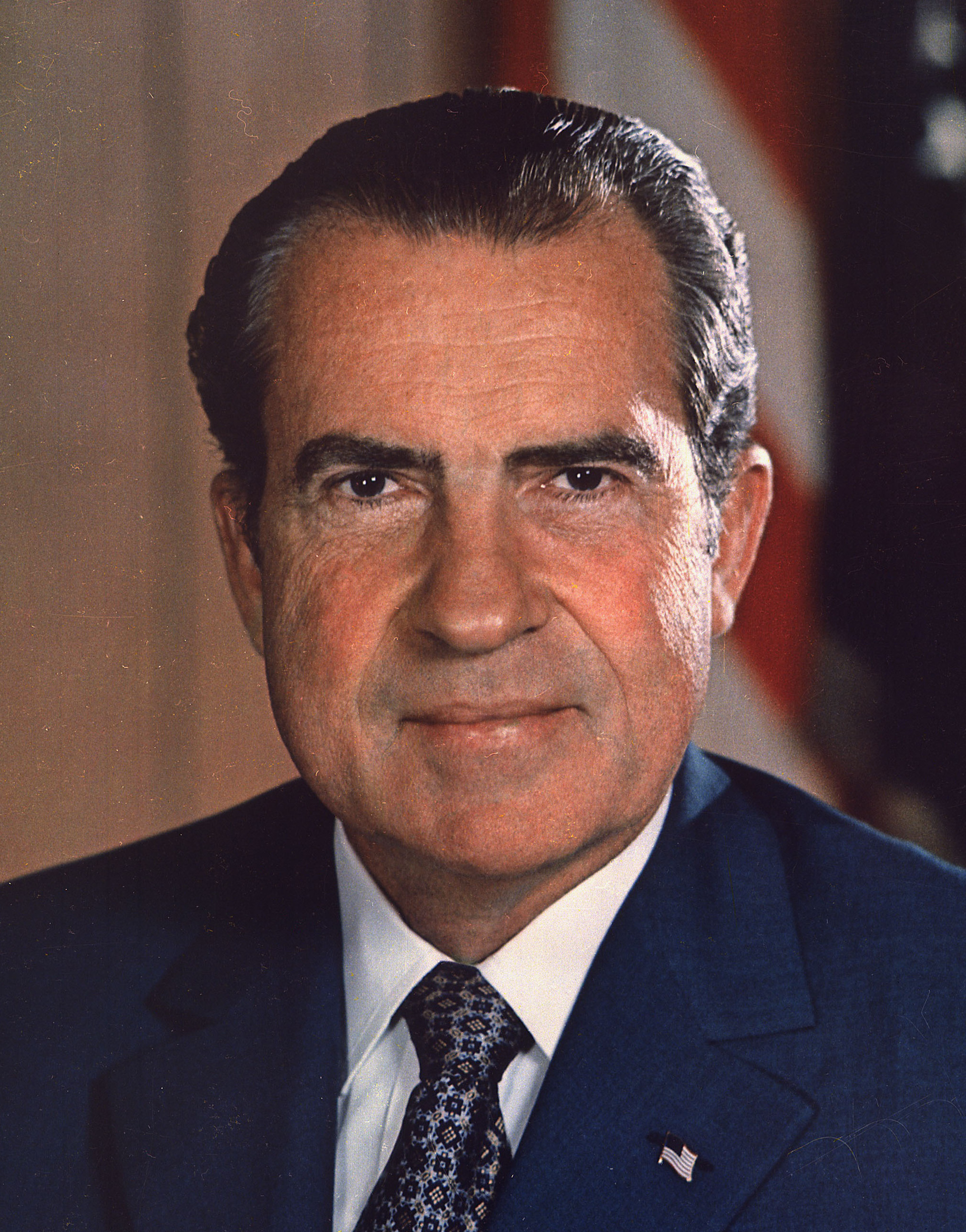
- Richard Nixon, whose administration popularized the strategy during the Vietnam War.
- Location: Washington, D.C.
- Leaders: Richard Nixon; Henry Kissinger; H. R. Haldeman
- Key events: Vietnam War; 1969 EC-121 shootdown incident; Operation Giant Lance

The madman theory is a political theory commonly associated with the foreign policy of U.S. president Richard Nixon and his administration, who tried to make the leaders of hostile Communist Bloc countries think Nixon was irrational and volatile so that they would avoid provoking the U.S. in fear of an unpredictable response.

The premise of madman theory is that the appearance of irrationality makes otherwise non-credible threats seem credible. For instance, in an era of mutually assured destruction, threats by a rational leader to escalate a dispute may seem suicidal and thus easily dismissible by adversaries. However, suicidal threats may seem credible if the leader is believed to be irrational.

International relations scholars have been skeptical of madman theory as a strategy for success in coercive bargaining. Prominent "madmen", such as Nixon, Nikita Khrushchev, Saddam Hussein, Donald Trump, and Muammar Gaddafi failed to win coercive disputes. One difficulty is making others believe you are genuinely a madman. Another difficulty is the inability of a madman to assure others that they will not be punished if they yield to a particular demand. One study found that madman theory is frequently counterproductive, but that it can be effective under certain conditions. Another study found that there are both bargaining advantages and disadvantages to perceived madness.

== History ==
In 1517, Niccolò Machiavelli argued that sometimes it is "a very wise thing to simulate madness" (Discourses on Livy, book 3, chapter 2). However, in Nixon's Vietnam War, Kimball argues that Nixon arrived at the strategy independently, as a result of practical experience and observation of Dwight D. Eisenhower's handling of the Korean War.

In his 1962 book Thinking About the Unthinkable, the futurist Herman Kahn argued that to "look a little crazy" might be an effective way to induce an adversary to stand down.

=== Richard Nixon ===
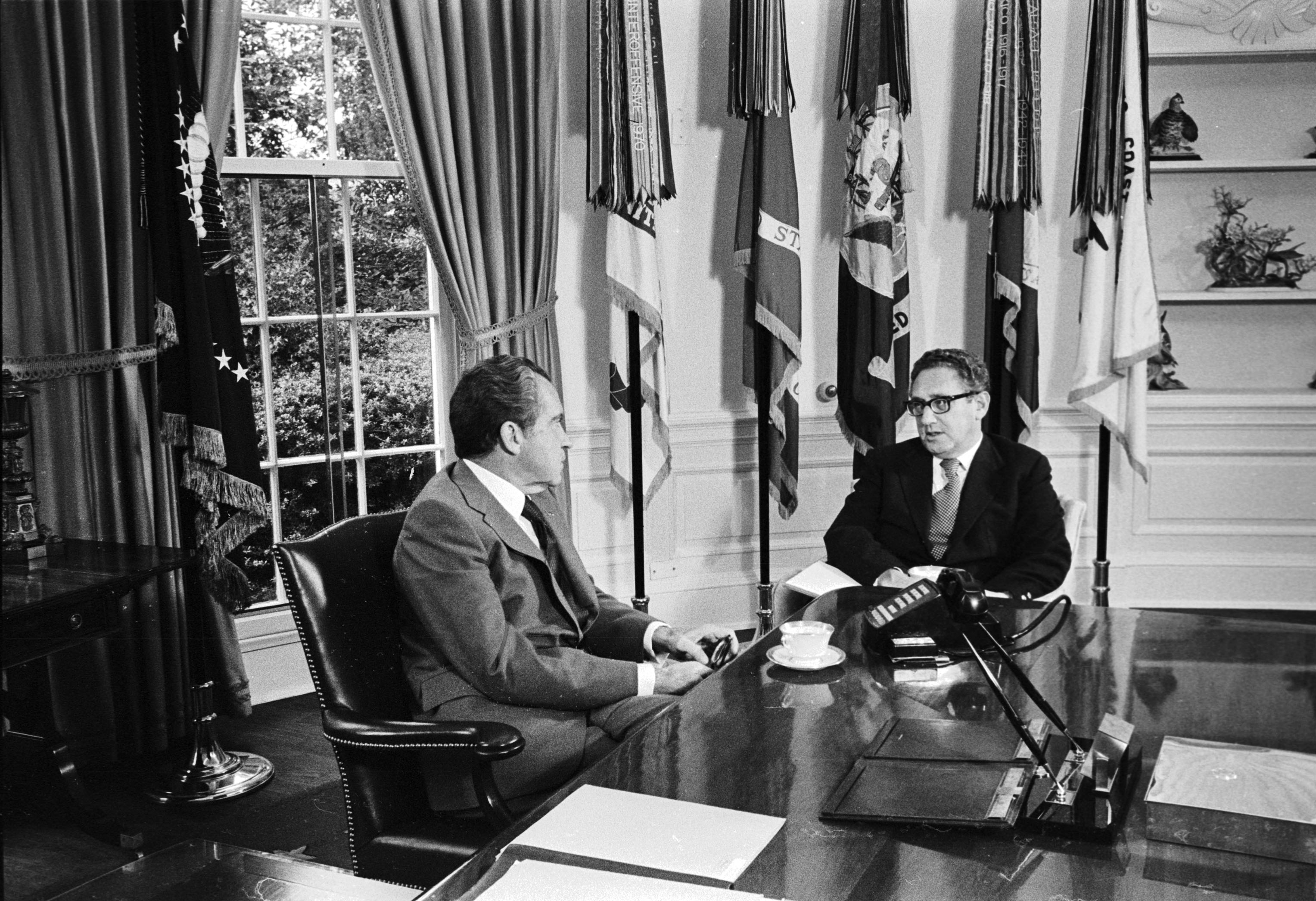
The secret alert "Joint Chiefs of Staff Readiness Test" in October 1969 was carried out at the direction of President Richard Nixon (left) and National Security Advisor Henry Kissinger (right).

Nixon's chief of staff, H. R. Haldeman, wrote that Nixon had confided to him:

I call it the Madman Theory, Bob. I want the North Vietnamese to believe I've reached the point where I might do anything to stop the war. We'll just slip the word to them that, "for God's sake, you know Nixon is obsessed about communism. We can't restrain him when he's angry—and he has his hand on the nuclear button" and Ho Chi Minh himself will be in Paris in two days begging for peace.

In October 1969, the Nixon administration indicated to the Soviet Union that "the madman was loose" when the United States military was ordered (unknown to the majority of the American population) to full global war readiness, an alert known as the "Joint Chiefs of Staff Readiness Test", which culminated in "Operation Giant Lance" when eighteen B-52 bombers armed with thermonuclear weapons flew patterns near the Soviet border for three consecutive days. However, according to the U.S. State Department, another explanation is that the Joint Chiefs of Staff Readiness Test was ordered by Nixon to deter a possible Soviet nuclear strike against the People's Republic of China in 1969.

The administration employed the "madman strategy" to force the North Vietnamese government to negotiate an end to the Vietnam War. In July 1969 (according to a CIA report declassified in February 2018), Nixon may have suggested to the South Vietnamese president Nguyễn Văn Thiệu that the two paths he was considering were either a nuclear weapons option or setting up a coalition government. According to the historian Michael S. Sherry, the 1970 incursion into Cambodia was part of the strategy to incentivize negotiations.

=== Nikita Khrushchev ===
The Soviet premier Nikita Khrushchev sought to develop the image of a madman, which was accepted to some degree by U.S. policymakers. For example, Secretary of State John Foster Dulles said Khrushchev "could be expected to commit irrational acts" and was "essentially emotional".

=== Donald Trump ===
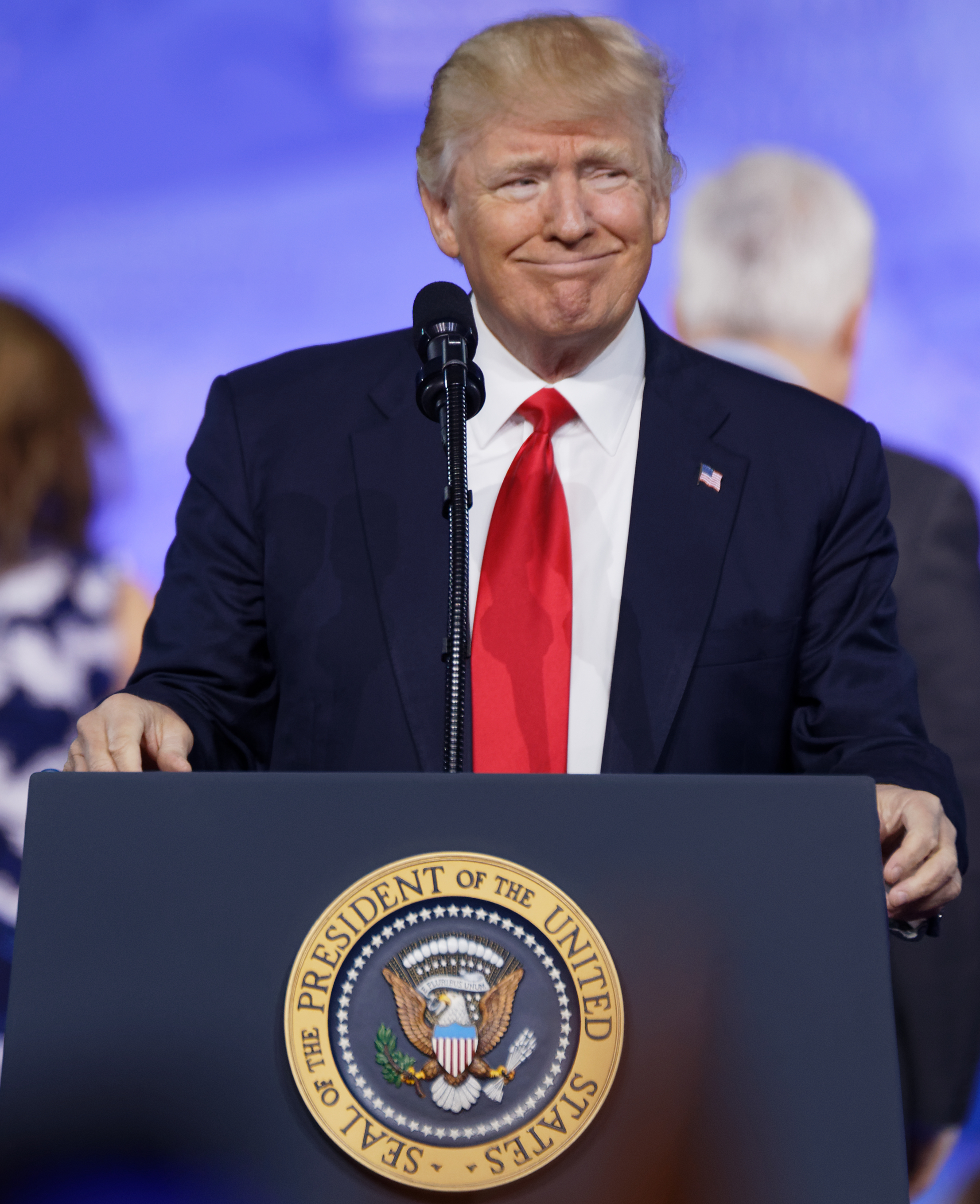
Some consider current U.S. president Donald Trump to be a modern example of the madman strategy.

Starting with his first term as U.S. president, some have characterized Donald Trump's behavior towards both allies and hostile states as an example of madman theory. For instance, during the KORUS FTA renegotiations Trump told U.S. trade negotiators to warn South Korean diplomats that "if they don't give the concessions now, this crazy guy will pull out of the deal", which Jonathan Swan of Axios characterized as a "madman" approach to international relations. Trump's application of madman theory was linked to the release of American pastor Andrew Brunson from Turkish detention in 2018, after Trump threatened Turkey's economy in retaliation.

Jonathan Stevenson argued in The New York Times that Trump's strategy could have been less effective than Nixon's because Nixon tried to give the impression that "he'd been pushed too far, implying that he would return to his senses if the Soviets and North Vietnamese gave in", whereas the North Korean government was unlikely to believe that "Trump would do the same" because his threats were "standard operating procedure", not a temporary emotional reaction. International relations scholar Roseanne W. McManus argued that Trump stating that he was relying on madman theory made the approach counterproductive, as he was undermining the belief that his "madness" was genuine.

During the 2024 U.S. presidential election campaign, Trump touted his version of the madman theory as a strategy he would utilize against China to deter an invasion or blockade of Taiwan, and against Russia to push for a peace deal to end its invasion of Ukraine. Trump has also stated that he could utilize the threats of high tariffs to incentivize trade deals without actually engaging in trade wars, and warnings about U.S. reluctance to defend NATO member states as a means of spurring NATO allies to invest in their own defense.

=== Vladimir Putin ===
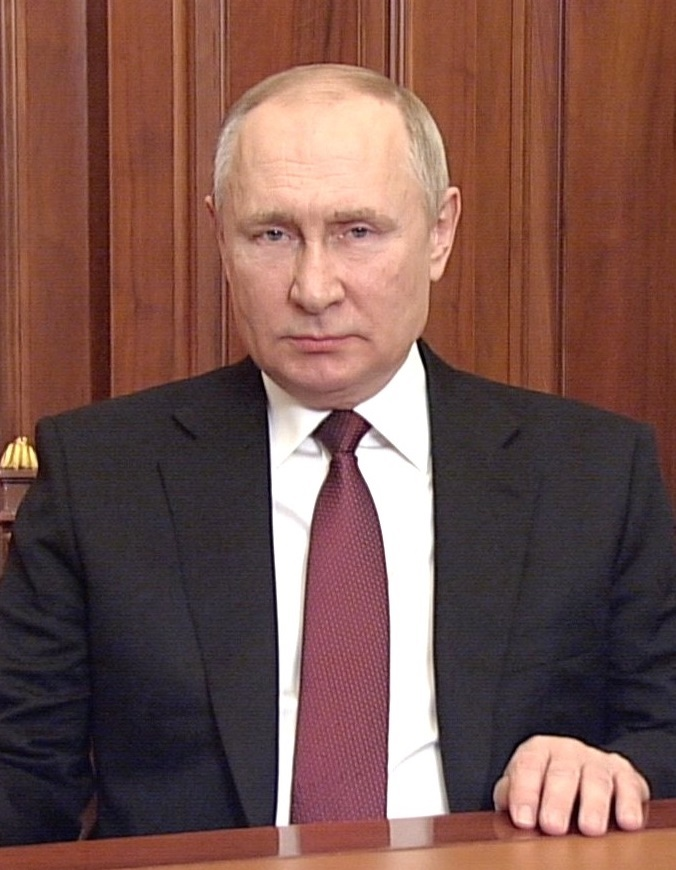
During the 2022 Russian invasion of Ukraine, several journalists speculated that Russian president Vladimir Putin was using the madman strategy.

Another example of madman theory has also been attributed to Russian president Vladimir Putin, especially in the lead-up to and during the 2022 invasion of Ukraine. In 2015, Martin Hellman stated that "nuclear weapons are the card that Putin has up his sleeve, and he's using it to get the world to realize that Russia is a superpower, not just a regional power". This use of the madman theory, Hellman argued, was something which the West had not "properly caught on to".

In 2022, days before the invasion, Gideon Rachman argued in the Financial Times that Putin's "penchant for publishing long, nationalist essays" regarding Ukrainian and Russian history, his plans of nuclear weapons exercises and his image of isolation and "growing increasingly out of touch and paranoid" during the COVID-19 pandemic, could have been a use of madman strategy. Rachman stated that Putin "is ruthless and amoral. But he is also shrewd and calculating. He takes risks, but he is not crazy", comparing Putin's recent actions to his more "rational" actions of the previous 20 years. However, Rachman also noted that "the line between acting like a madman and being a madman is disconcertingly thin".

In the first days of the invasion, Paul Taylor of Politico also speculated that Putin was using the madman strategy after his decision to place Russian deterrence nuclear forces on "special alert". Taylor stated that Putin was exhibiting "pathological behavior" by "swinging wildly from seeming openness to negotiations to a full-scale invasion of Ukraine in four fronts, while threatening the world with mass destruction". Taylor also stated, in reference to Putin's television address prior to the invasion, that "his branding Ukraine's elected leaders as drug-addicted neo-Nazis raised doubts even among supportive Russians about his mental state and health".

== Research ==
The political scientist Scott Sagan and the historian Jeremi Suri have criticized the theory as "ineffective and dangerous", citing the belief that the Soviet leader Leonid Brezhnev did not understand what Nixon was trying to communicate and the chance of an accident from the increased movements of U.S. forces. Criticism of Trump's alleged use of the theory with North Korea has similarly suggested the chance of an accident arising from North Korea's string of missile testing was also increased. Stephen Walt has argued that few successful cases of madman theory can be found in the historical record. Roseanne McManus has argued that some forms of "madness" can be an asset in bargaining, whereas other forms are counterproductive. Joshua A. Schwartz points out that besides any quantifiable advantage in foreign relations, the perceived madness also "entails significant domestic costs that potentially erode its efficacy".

According to the political scientists Samuel Seitz and Caitlin Talmadge, "The historical record, both before Trump’s presidency and during it, demonstrates that madman tactics typically fail to strengthen deterrence or generate bargaining leverage." They cite three main reasons: target states fail to receive the message that the "madman" thinks he is sending; target states do not see the "madman" behavior as credible; and target states do not give in to the "madman" even when they believe the madman rhetoric, because the madman is perceived as being unable to make credible assurances of future behavior.

== See also ==
- Brinkmanship
- Deterrence theory
- Good cop, bad cop
- Operation Giant Lance
