= Nuclear umbrella =

Type of international nuclear weapons policy

Nuclear umbrellas (as of April 2024): States possessing nuclear weapons North Atlantic Treaty Organization (NATO) Non-NATO states under the United States' nuclear umbrella Collective Security Treaty Organization (CSTO)

A "nuclear umbrella" is a guarantee by a nuclear-weapon state to defend a non-nuclear allied state. The context is usually the security alliances of the United States with Australia, Japan, South Korea, the North Atlantic Treaty Organization (much of Europe, Turkey and Canada) and the Compact of Free Association (the Federated States of Micronesia, the Marshall Islands, and Palau). Those alliances were formed because of the Cold War and the Soviet Union. For some countries, it was an alternative to acquiring nuclear weapons themselves; other alternatives include regional nuclear-weapon-free zones or nuclear sharing. Nuclear umbrellas are also referred to as "extended deterrence" under which a nuclear-weapon state extends its nuclear deterrent to cover threats against its non-nuclear-weapon state allies.

== United States-provided ==
The United States has promised its role as a "nuclear umbrella" for numerous non-nuclear allied states, even as early as the Cold War. The US now has security alliances of this nature with around 30 countries, many within NATO itself. The country also has notable arrangements of this type with South Korea and Australia. The US understood the power of deterrence with nuclear weapons early on, beginning with the concept of massive retaliation during the Eisenhower administration. As the USSR and other countries became nuclear powers as well, however, the risk of any nuclear exchange became more clear. This, in part, motivated the US to adopt the new strategy of deterrence, in which they would have more control over the situation, while still maintaining the ability to intervene in conflicts, a nuclear umbrella. The US provides protection and deterrence for various countries under its umbrella, and in turn, the countries do not pursue nuclear weapons programs themselves. More recently, however, concerns have been raised about the diminishing power of such a threat, due to the rapid increase of nuclear weapons of mass destruction across the globe. Russia in particular has caused concern, having focused their military doctrine on nuclear weapons, as well as continued in the development of their weapons programs. Currently, the United States holds only some "nonstrategic" military weapons in Europe, and these nonstrategic weapons aid in reassuring countries under the umbrella, and emphasizing their role as a deterrent. The strategy of deterrence remains unequivocally important for the country, but many argue that the US will face various new challenges when it comes to the rise of other nuclear powers and weapons of mass destruction.

=== To NATO ===
NATO was formed early in the Cold War and, from the beginning, assumed American nuclear power as a major component of defense of Western Europe from possible Soviet invasion. NATO Article 5 allows for collective defense to a military attack on any NATO member. Most non-Communist European states joined the alliance, although some (Ireland, Switzerland, Austria, Sweden, Finland) instead maintained an official policy of neutrality. Sweden and Switzerland considered developing their own nuclear weapons but abandoned the idea. Apart from European states, the NATO nuclear umbrella extends to Canada.

NATO involved others of the five NPT-designated nuclear weapons states. The United Kingdom and Canada participated in the initial American development of the atomic bomb (Manhattan Project) during World War II, but were afterwards excluded from nuclear weapons secrets by act of the US Congress. Britain launched an independent nuclear weapons program; after Britain successfully developed thermonuclear weapons, the US and UK signed the 1958 US–UK Mutual Defence Agreement sharing American weapons designs, eliminating the need for independent development. Canada has not officially maintained and possessed weapons of mass destruction since 1984 (Canada and weapons of mass destruction)

After the end of the Cold War, many Central and Eastern European countries joined NATO.

=== In Asia ===
==== To Japan ====
The Japanese nuclear weapon program was conducted during World War II. Like the German nuclear weapons program, it suffered from an array of problems, and was ultimately unable to progress beyond the laboratory stage. Following the atomic bombings of Hiroshima and Nagasaki, World War II and the deconstruction of the imperial military, Japan came under the US "nuclear umbrella" on the condition that it will not produce nuclear weapons. This was formalized in the Security Treaty Between the United States and Japan, which preceded the current security alliance, the Treaty of Mutual Cooperation and Security between the United States and Japan.

Japan and the United States also have a major missile defense accord to mitigate the North Korean nuclear threat, among others and have deployed the Aegis Ballistic Missile Defense System jointly.

==== To South Korea ====
Following the Korean War, South Korea was welcomed under the US "nuclear umbrella" after signing the ROK-US mutual security treaty on October 1, 1953. This was characteristic of US defense and foreign policy at the time, which championed extended deterrence in an effort to prevent any nuclear conflict. The agreement also aligned with the US nonproliferation objectives, by eliminating the need for South Korea to develop its own nuclear weapons program. In the ROK-US mutual security treaty, the US agreed to deter attacks against South Korea and defend them in the case of attacks, and to deploy troops at the Korean Demilitarized Zone. The US also positioned tactical nuclear weapons on the Korean Peninsula, but these weapons were retracted by President Bush in September 1991. The US nuclear umbrella over South Korea has persisted for almost 70 years. Most agree on the necessity and significance of the US nuclear umbrella and the ROK-US treaty for South Korea, and expect it to hold its place.

In 2013, two Northrop B-2 Spirit strategic bombers flew to and from their home airbase in Missouri, dropping inert munitions off South Korea's coast, in a show of force against North Korea and to its allies in South Korea and Japan.

In 2023, the USS Kentucky nuclear-armed ballistic missile submarine docked in South Korea, marking the first presence of nuclear weapons in South Korea since the US withdrew its tactical weapons in 1991, and the first US nuclear-armed submarine visit to South Korea since 1981.

==== To Taiwan ====
The United States deployed nuclear weapons in Taiwan between 1958 and 1974. These included Nike Hercules missiles and nuclear gravity bombs.

==== To the Philippines ====
The United States deployed nuclear weapons to the Philippines between 1957 and 1977. In 2017 the Philippines signed the Treaty on the Prohibition of Nuclear Weapons, which prohibits use or threat of use of nuclear weapons and is understood to prohibit reliance on extended nuclear deterrence.

==== To China ====
In 1969, during the Sino-Soviet border conflict, the USSR considered a massive nuclear attack on China, targeting cities and nuclear facilities. It made military activity in the Soviet Far East, and informed its allies and the United States of this potential attack. The Chinese government and archives were evacuated from Beijing while the People's Liberation Army scattered from its bases. The crisis abated when US Secretary of State Henry Kissinger informed the Soviet Union that an attack on China would be met by a US nuclear attack on 130 Soviet cities. According to the U.S. Department of State, one of the two main "after-the-fact explanations" for the Joint Chiefs of Staff Readiness Test, culminating in Operation Giant Lance, conducted by the U.S military in October 1969 was to deter a possible Soviet nuclear strike against the People's Republic of China.

=== In Oceania ===
ANZUS is a security treaty between Australia, New Zealand, and the United States that was signed on September 1, 1951. This treaty was meant to assure peace in the South Pacific region. It was primarily a tactic against communist spread assuring Australia and New Zealand they would not be caught under communist grip. New Zealand, Australia, and the United States agreed to maintain and develop military resources to prevent an attack from communist countries in the Pacific. As late as 1970, Australia considered embarking on nuclear weapons development but finally agreed to sign the Nuclear Non-Proliferation Treaty. Since then Australia has been a proponent of nuclear disarmament. New Zealand declared themselves as a nuclear free zone in 1984 which refused to allow US nuclear powered ships to dock in New Zealand. Thus, in 1986 the United States suspended its treaty with New Zealand, but kept it with Australia. Today, leaders in the Australian government publicly acknowledge the country's reliance on the US nuclear umbrella. Australia no longer faces immediate nuclear threats, but they do still rely on the US for protection in any future instances, making them one of 31 countries under the US nuclear umbrella.

== Soviet and Russian-provided ==
=== To the Warsaw Pact ===
Like NATO, the members of the Warsaw Pact were protected by nuclear weapons of the Soviet Union with the weapons being deployed either in Soviet territory or closer to NATO in territory of the other member states. The USSR stationed its own nuclear weapons in East Germany, Czechoslovakia, Poland, and Hungary. At least one member of the Warsaw Pact, Romania, did consider developing its own arsenal but later abandoned it. Most Eastern European Communist states were part of the Warsaw Pact with the exception of Yugoslavia which became neutral especially after the Tito–Stalin Split and pursued its own nuclear program, and Albania later left the alliance after the Soviet–Albanian split and aligned itself with the People's Republic of China which had also cut ties with the Soviets in the Sino-Soviet split. Bulgaria-Soviet treaties allowed for nuclear sharing in the event of war with NATO, but it is disputed whether Bulgaria hosted nuclear weapons for the USSR.

=== To the CSTO ===
In November 2024, Russian defense minister Sergei Shoigu reiterated that Russia's nuclear umbrella covers the members of the Collective Security Treaty Organization, an alliance of former Soviet republics. Additionally, from June 2023, Russia has deployed some of its own nuclear weapons in Belarus, which together with Russia forms the Union State. Conversely, Kazakhstan signed the 2017 Treaty on the Prohibition of Nuclear Weapons, which is understood to forbid nuclear threats and thus extended nuclear deterrence.

=== To Belarus ===
In November 2024, Russian defense minister Sergei Shoigu specified that new Russian doctrine allows nuclear first use in response to conventional attacks against Belarus that threaten Belarus' "very existence".

=== To Egypt and Syria ===
For some time during the 1960s and 1970s Arab–Israeli conflict, including the Yom Kippur War, the Soviet Union extended its nuclear umbrella to Egypt and Syria, as the US government was aware.

=== To Mongolia ===
During the Cold War, the USSR stationed nuclear weapons in the Mongolian People's Republic.

=== To Cuba ===
In 1961, the US-backed Bay of Pigs Invasion against Fidel Castro's Cuban Revolution failed. During the 1962 Cuban Missile Crisis, the USSR deployed nuclear-armed missiles and bombers to Cuba, triggering a US blockade, international crisis and nuclear confrontation. They were removed within two months, and the United States agreed to not invade Cuba or allow on its territory the planning of another invasion similar to Bay of Pigs, as well as remove US nuclear missiles from Turkey and Italy.

== Provided by others ==
=== United Kingdom-provided ===
The United Kingdom has possessed nuclear weapons from its first test in 1952 and first operational deployment in 1954. It is also a NATO member. The Integrated Review Refresh 2023 defense document states that UK nuclear weapons are assigned to the defense of NATO.

During the Cold War, the United Kingdom stationed nuclear weapons in West Germany, in Singapore, and in its Akrotiri and Dhekelia airbase in Cyprus. The deployment of Blue Peacock UK nuclear land mines to West German territory was abandoned as too provocative.

In October 2026, the Royal Navy chief stated that the British nuclear deterrent would be extended to the member states of the Joint Expeditionary Force (primarily, Nordics and Baltics).

=== France-provided ===
France developed a nuclear force de frappe and left the NATO command structure while continuing to be allied with the other Western countries. NATO nuclear sharing was conceived to prevent further independent proliferation among the western allies. France later rejoined the NATO joint military command on April 4, 2009. Despite this, France does not participate in NATO's nuclear planning group and maintains the independence of its nuclear decision making.

On the 2nd of March 2026, President Emmanuel Macron vowed to include 7 European allies under France's nuclear umbrella (Netherlands, Belgium, Germany, Denmark, Sweden, Poland and Greece). France also announced an increase in the size of its nuclear stockpile, though said it would not specify by how much.

=== To Ukraine ===
==== By the US, UK, and Russia ====
The 1994 Budapest Memorandum includes:

The Russian Federation, the United Kingdom of Great Britain and Northern Ireland, and The United States of America reaffirm their commitment to seek immediate United Nations Security Council action to provide assistance to Ukraine, as a non-nuclear-weapon state party to the Treaty on the Non-Proliferation of Nuclear Weapons, if Ukraine should become a victim of an act of aggression or an object of a threat of aggression in which nuclear weapons are used.

— Memorandum on security assurances in connection with Ukraine’s accession to the Treaty on the Non-Proliferation of Nuclear Weapons

==== By China ====
In a unilateral governmental statement in 1994, China provided Ukraine with nuclear security guarantee, where China states its inclination to peaceful settlement of differences and disputes by way of fair consultations. In December 2013, Ukrainian President Viktor Yanukovych and Chinese Communist Party leader Xi Jinping signed a bilateral treaty and published a joint statement, where China reaffirmed that it will provide Ukraine with nuclear security guarantees upon nuclear invasion or threats of invasion. People's Daily, the official newspaper of the Central Committee of the Chinese Communist Party, used the headline "China offers Ukraine nuclear umbrella protection", which has been censored since the Russian invasion of Ukraine. When asked about the 2013 pact during a news conference on 3 March 2022, Wang Wenbin, a spokesperson for China's Foreign Ministry, sidestepped the question by referring to a United Nations resolution on the security of nonnuclear states like Ukraine. “The security assurances have clear limitations on the content and are triggered under specific conditions,” Mr. Wang said.

== Effectiveness ==
In general, since the concept's inception, countries under a nuclear umbrella have not been subject to direct military invasion from another country. Exceptions include the invasions of Warsaw Pact countries by the Soviet and other Warsaw Pact forces, to suppress opposition to communist government: Soviet military action during the Hungarian Revolution of 1956, and the 1968 Warsaw Pact invasion of Czechoslovakia.

The 1979 Soviet military planning scenario, Seven Days to the River Rhine, envisioned a nuclear war in Europe. It began with a NATO nuclear first strike on cities in Poland and Czechoslovakia. The Soviet Union would launch a nuclear retaliatory strike on cities in West Germany, northeast Italy, the Netherlands, Belgium, and Denmark, all NATO members, as well as the neutral nation of Austria. Warsaw Pact armies would then occupy West Germany, Austria, the Netherlands, Denmark. Plans were also made for conventional strikes on RAF bases in the United Kingdom, and in an extended plan the invasion of France. However it is believed these two countries were not targeted by Soviet nuclear strikes to prevent the use of their own nuclear weapons. This plan implies that, in the Soviets' view, once a nuclear war had started, the Warsaw Pact and NATO nuclear umbrellas would cease to exist, while the actual nuclear weapons states would remained protected by nuclear deterrence.

== Missile defense ==
Missile defense would provide an "umbrella" of another kind against nuclear attack. This is not the conventional usage of "nuclear umbrella", but a rhetorical device promoting active defense over the nuclear deterrence the conventional "nuclear umbrella" depends upon. NATO had an expansive strategy with respect to missile defense. In 1999, it was concluded that they would need some form of defense against nuclear, biological, or chemical threats. One form of strategy was declared at the 2002 Prague Summit, the NATO Active Layered Ballistic Missile Defense (ALTBMD). This was an extension to the deployed forces program in 2005, namely, guaranteeing their safety. One of the leading motivations for the strategic concept is that NATO centered on the proliferation of nuclear weapons and alternatives for weapons of mass destruction as being an incalculable threat to global life and prosperity. More recent, on March 6, 2013, the first European theater missile interceptor system proved successful to work in conjunction with NATO's Interim Ballistic Missile Defense (BMD) command and control system, such that it successfully engaged and destroyed a theater ballistic missile target set at the French Firing Range in Biscarrosse. Countries involved with NATO host various components of the NATO missile defense command and control systems. The United States contribution to the NATO BMD is through its European Phased Adaptive Approach (EPAA). Turkey hosts the United States BMD radar in Kürecik. Romania hosts a United States Aegis Ashore Site at Deveselu Military Base. Germany hosts the command center Ramstein Air Base. In addition to the EPAA, Spain holds four multi-mission BMD-capable Aegis Ships at the Rota Naval Base. With respect to all these constituents, they are in fact all voluntarily hosted. Outside of this there is additional composition of force protection and BMD capable-assets, that in the event of needed support could be engaged. With the stakes of nuclear war implausibly comprehensive advocacy groups such as the Missile Defense Advocacy Alliance (MDAA) were formed as a public initiative to cultivate an environment for the critical importance of supporting the funding and development of missile defense systems. The MDAA is a non-profit organization that has set out a mission to educate the general public on advocacy for the testing, continued development, and deployment of missile defense systems and the urgent consequences of handicapping a missile defense system.

== See also ==
- Nixon Doctrine
