= Hickey College =

- Motto: Finish First
- Type: For-profit college
- Active: 1933–2018
- President: Mr. Chris Gearin
- Students: 300
- Location: St. Louis, Missouri, United States; 38°42′03″N 90°26′52″W
- Website: www.hickeycollege.edu

Hickey College was a for-profit career college in St. Louis, Missouri. It was founded in 1933 by Dr. Margaret Hickey and had two campuses on North Lindbergh Boulevard near Lambert-St. Louis International Airport. It had nearby housing for students but over half of students come from the St. Louis area. The college closed in 2018.

Hickey College awarded diplomas, associate degrees, and bachelor's degrees.

== Student body, admissions, and outcomes ==
According to Peterson's and institutional publications, Hickey College had an undergraduate population of 396. Of 852 applicants, 615 (or 72%) were admitted. According to College Navigator, in the most recent reporting year the graduation rate was 81%.

== Academics ==
Hickey College provided career-focused courses to high school graduates. The college claimed that its programs generally offered hands-on learning opportunities that helped prepare graduates to start working immediately. Some programs offered externships as well. Students could graduate in 8–12 months by earning a diploma. Associate degree programs could be completed in 16–18 months. Upperclassmen pursuing bachelor's degrees generally worked during the day and took evening classes.

Hickey College divides its nine major areas of study into four main categories: Business, Technology, Health Care, and Culinary/Design.

=== The Culinary Institute of St. Louis at Hickey College ===
The Culinary Institute of St. Louis at Hickey College was a for-profit culinary arts career college located in St. Louis, Missouri. It operated as a specialized institution offering an 18-month culinary arts program to high school graduates. The Institute awarded associate degrees in culinary arts to graduates.

Students received hands-on instruction in one of five kitchens. Students also took non-kitchen courses, almost all of which are focused on culinary arts career knowledge. During the last semester, students completed an off-site externship.

=== Accreditation ===
Hickey College was accredited by the Accrediting Council for Independent Colleges and Schools to award diplomas, associate degrees, and bachelor's degrees. The Veterinary Technician program was accredited by the American Veterinary Medical Association (AVMA) Committee on Veterinary Technician Education and Activities (CVTEA).
