= World Order (book) =

2014 book by Henry Kissinger

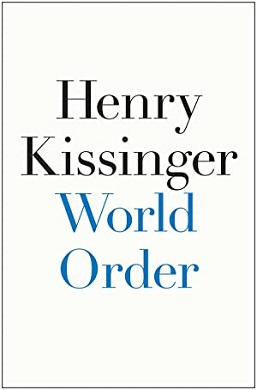
- First edition
- Author: Henry Kissinger
- Language: English
- Subject: International relations
- Publisher: Penguin Books
- Publication date: September 9, 2014
- Publication place: United States
- Media type: Print
- Pages: 432 pp.
- ISBN: 978-0241004272

World Order is a book about international relations written by Henry Kissinger and published in 2014 by Penguin Books.

== Summary ==
In World Order, Kissinger says "World Order refers to the concept held by a region or civilization about the nature of just arrangements and the distribution of power thought to be applicable to the entire world." In the book, he explains how Western ideas changed with the 1648 Peace of Westphalia treaty, and explains the four systems of historic world order: the Westphalian Peace born of 17th-century Europe, the central imperium philosophy of China, the religious supremacism of political Islam, and the democratic idealism of the United States. Kissinger aims to provide a window into today's struggling framework of international order.

== Reception ==
The New York Times praised the book, declaring, "his writing functions like a powerful zoom lens, opening out to give us a panoramic appreciation of larger historical trends and patterns, then zeroing in on small details and anecdotes that vividly illustrate his theories."

The book has also garnered positive reviews from Hillary Clinton, The Wall Street Journal, Time, The Los Angeles Times, and The Guardian, among many others.
