= On China =

Book by Henry Kissinger

- First-edition cover
- Author: Henry Kissinger
- Language: English
- Subject: History, diplomacy, leadership, political science, culture
- Published: 2011 (Penguin Press)
- Publication place: United States
- Pages: 608 pages (1st edition, hard cover)
- ISBN: 9781594202711
- Preceded by: Crisis: The Anatomy of Two Major Foreign Policy Crises
- Followed by: World Order

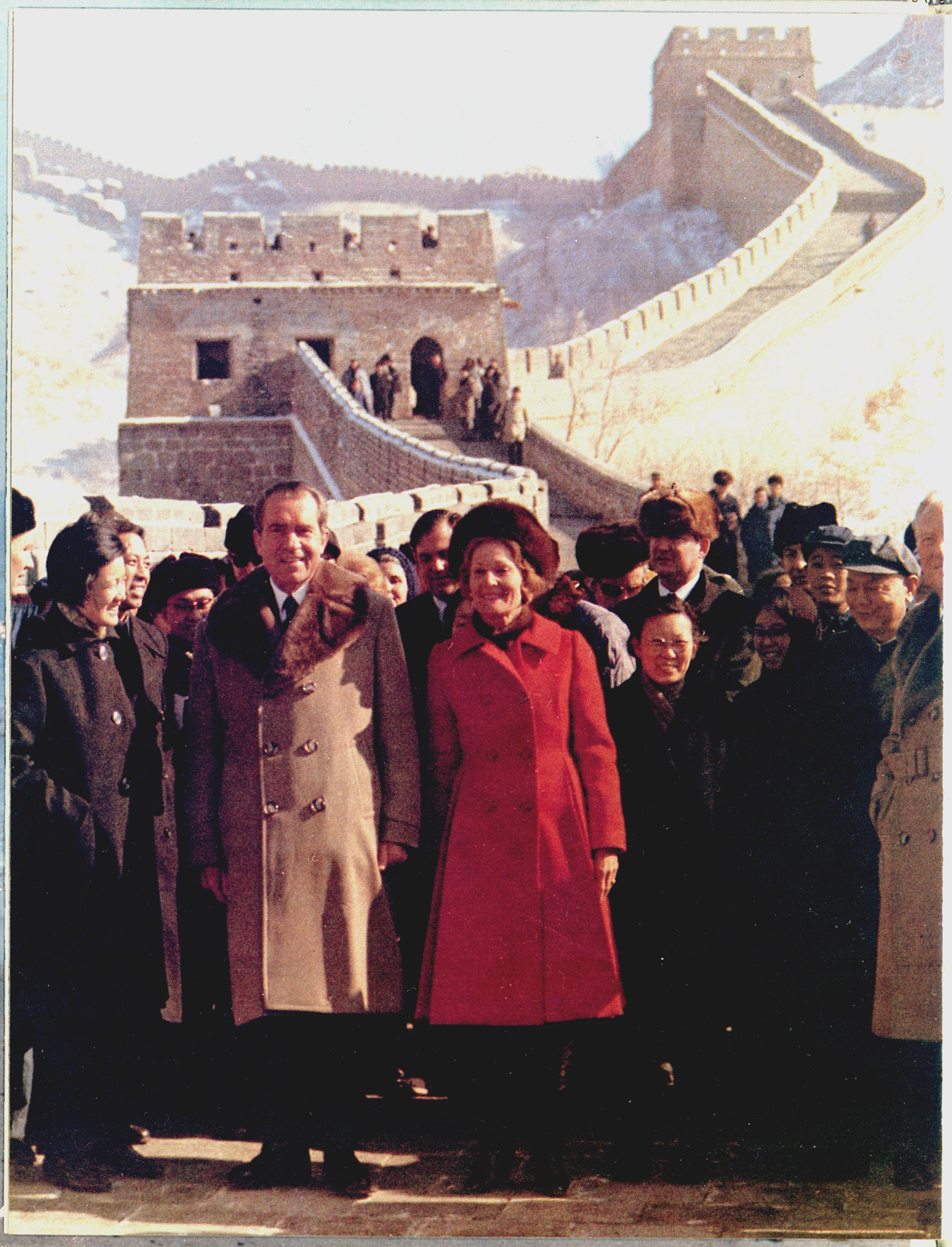
President and Mrs. Nixon visit the Great Wall of China and the Ming tombs, 24 February 1972.

On China is a 2011 non-fiction book by Henry Kissinger, former National Security Adviser and United States Secretary of State. The book is part an effort to make sense of China's strategy in diplomacy and foreign policy over 3000 years and part an attempt to provide an authentic insight on Chinese Communist Party leaders. Kissinger, considered one of the most famous diplomats of the 20th century, played an integral role in developing the relationship between the United States and the People's Republic of China during the Nixon administration, which culminated in Nixon's 1972 visit to China.

Kissinger's book focuses on Chinese history through the lens of foreign policy considerations, particularly his own brand of realpolitik. The book begins by inspecting China's historical views on peace and war, international order and compares it to the United States' approach to foreign policy. The book follows how Sino-Soviet border clashes forced China to consider building a relationship with the United States. Kissinger records his own experiences in coordinating the 1972 Nixon visit, including authentic accounts on the nature of Mao Zedong and personality of Zhou Enlai. The final part of the book looks to the future of Sino-American relations, critiquing the areas which prevent the US and China from developing a mutually beneficial relationship whilst warning of the consequences of another cold war.

The book is a combination of pure history, discussion of foreign policy and personal narration of Kissinger's experiences in China. It does not fit in to the genre of autobiography, memoir or monograph, but can be considered part reminiscence, part reflection, part history and part exploration in to the life of Kissinger and his experiences with China. The book has received various reviews since its release in 2011. The response to Kissinger was polarising with the book receiving varying responses from several newspapers and individuals.

== Background ==
=== Henry Kissinger ===
On China is the 13th book written by Henry Alfred Kissinger (1923–2023), completed by him in 2011 at the age of 88, 34 years after he retired his position in the American political system. Kissinger was a German-born American political scientist who was the first person to serve as both National Security Adviser and Secretary of State. He was awarded a PhD at Harvard in 1954, and swiftly transitioned in to the American political system working with the likes of Nelson Rockefeller, Chester Bowles and Lucius Clay. He worked with Rockefeller on various projects until 1968, who, impressed with Kissinger's professionalism gave word to Nixon to offer him a role as the president's assistant for National Security Affairs in 1968. Kissinger became National Security Adviser in 1969 and Secretary of State in 1973.

=== US–PRC relations ===
Relations between the United States and China after the Second World War had been paternalistic and relatively friendly. However, relations fractured in 1949-1950 when the People's Republic of China was established on 1 October after peasant-backed Communists defeated the Nationalist government of Chiang Kai-shek. The ideological tensions between the U.S. and the People's Republic of China were worsened by the Korean War and The First Taiwan Strait Crisis which saw America engage in battle against China and threaten nuclear attack. The Tibetan Uprising and China's first atomic test in 1964 would further strain US-PRC relations with the predominant American representation of China revolving around aggression, expansionism and extremism. It was only when underlying Sino-Soviet tensions escalated in to the Sino-Soviet border conflict in 1969, and subsequent nuclear threats from Moscow, did China look to the U.S. With a common enemy, the Soviet Union, China and the U.S. adjusted their policy toward each other and engaged in rapprochement in 1970. Under Nixon, Henry Kissinger normalised U.S. and Chinese relations by connecting with high ranking Chinese officials; opening the US up to China. Kissinger arranged a secret meeting in China in 1971 and Richard Nixon's 1972 visit to China. The 1972 Summit between the U.S. and China opened communication, trade, and agreement on certain principles of international conduct.

== Content ==
Kissinger's On China is a combination of history, personal narrative, political analysis and reflection being compiled in to 17 chapters. One reviewer delineates the book is an "attempt to explain Chinese diplomacy to an American audience, to review the course of U.S.–China relations, and briefly but incisively to address the challenge of sustaining a mutually beneficial interaction".

In the first few chapters of the book Kissinger provides a history of the Chinese view on international affairs and their concepts of international relations. He focuses on Chinese Realpolitik and Sun Tzu's Art of War. Kissinger states that for many years China was the "middle kingdom" of the world surrounded by various small and insignificant states which threatened invasion leading to the construction of a strategic body of thought. Kissinger describes China's belief that they are the centre of the world and exemplify the paradigm of civilisation. Kissinger examines the domestic and international hardships of China which presaged the development of the People's Republic of China. Zachary Keck from E-International Relations wrote "This helps convey the continuity in Chinese foreign policy that, to some degree, hints that there is some predictability in Beijing's actions".

Kissinger introduces Mao Zedong's ideologies, aspiration and tactics and his quest for psychological advantage. Kissinger references how a Chinese game known as wei qi (or Go) drove China's military engagements and influenced their position in the cold war. Kissinger follows on with the topic of the Cold War by summarising the motives of U.S, North Korea, China and the USSR, examining triangular diplomacy and the causes of the Korean War. Kissinger proffers that the result of the cold war was a failure for all parties involved within the conflict.

The American and Chinese road to reconciliation is detailed. Kissinger discusses the political and international contexts which led to the meeting of President Nixon and Mao Zedong. Kissinger includes a recount of discussion between the Mao and Nixon and the Nixon-Zhou dialogue and various other conversations leading up to their deaths in 1976. The process of examining the leading political figures of China and the problems they faced allowed the reader to "look over the shoulder in the traditions of classic realism". He reveals Zhou promoted the need for four modernisations in China before he died. Kissinger examines the legacies left behind by Mao and Zhou.

The rise of Deng is recorded in the later chapters of the book, revealing how he effectively reformed and opened China up. The book shows how Deng neutralised relations with the U.S. and strengthened China internally to preclude the spread of Soviet influence. He records the deaths of leaders such as Hua Guofeng. Kissinger records how China adopted a three-world approach in response to international relations.

The latter part of the book covers the relationship between the U.S. and China under President Clinton in the 1990s, the disintegrating of the Soviet Union and the Third Taiwan Strait Crisis. The state of affairs as per 2011 (when the book was written) is assessed, providing an optimistic view of China's international role. Kissinger also articulates the areas in which the U.S. and China differ in the modern international environment.

The books final parts examine the future of China and the US and their relationship together. He posits that China will continue to develop into a superpower, whilst comparing the US-China relationship to the Britain and German pre-World War Two. Kissinger finishes examining contemporary areas which erode the U.S. and Chinese ability to create a mutually beneficial relationship.

== Reception ==
On China has received various reviews since its release in 2011. There has been appraisal, criticism and nuanced reviews from a multiplicity of well-known newspapers and journals, which have critiqued Kissinger's perspective, objectivity and content found within his book.

=== Praise ===
Donald S. Zagoria from Columbia University considered Kissinger's book a "remarkable achievement" which "will certainly add to his reputation as one of America's pre-eminent strategic thinkers". He found the book multifaceted, with various parts attempting to achieve several outcomes. Zagoria reflected that the book tried to make sense of Chinese diplomacy and foreign policy across its entirety as an empire and nation, while also being "part memoir, part reflection, and part a memorandum to U.S. policymakers on how to achieve a cooperative relationship with this rising superpower". Kissinger is praised for being realistic and prudent, and the book is recommended to students of specialising in U.S. relations to China.

Oxford University historian Rana Mitter, who specialises in the history of the Republic of China, considered Kissinger's book an erudite and elegant insight into the new world superpower. In his review, Mitter wrote of the freshness of the history because it was written by "a surviving top-level figure who was at the 1971 meeting". Mitter was impressed by the authentic accounts of the personality of Mao as "sardonic" and Zhou "penetrating". Mitter believes Kissinger "showed a long-term vision that few politicians of any country could match today".

Los Angeles Times former China correspondent, Linda Mathews, offered another positive review. Mathews described the book as a blend of strategic analysis of China, the United States and the Soviet Union, which was informative and authentic. Mathews was also impressed by the vignettes of his meetings with Chinese Communist Party leaders. The review suggests that those who love diplomatic history will "delight" in the assessment of the misconceptions, mistakes and missed opportunities that fractured the relations between the U.S. and PRC prior to Nixon's historic trip. She concludes that for the ordinary reader, the book offers enthralling, "entertaining and sometimes gossipy accounts of his meetings with China's most august leaders".

=== Criticism ===
Former chief critic for the New York Times Michiko Kakutani regarded Kissinger's On China as a measure to protect his image in the public eye, whilst underplaying the consequences of Chinese leadership on civilians. Kakutani establishes Kissinger's On China as a "sometimes perverse" book which attempts to address the role he played in connecting Nixon to China whilst provide an exploration of the history of China, its policies and attitudes toward the west. She contends, however, that as Kissinger explores his dealings with China he attempts to burnish his legacy as Nixon's National Security Adviser and Secretary of State. Kakutani also illuminates Kissinger's soft-pedalling of the human costs of Mao's ruthless decades-long reign. Additionally, Kakutani questions the consequences of more recent American efforts to press human-rights issues with the Chinese. She suggested Kissinger is "chillingly cavalier" about the millions of people who died under Mao's rule, exhibiting ignorance and naivety about Mao under the many myths he created about himself.

A review published by The Economist condemned Kissinger's On China as an inaccurate and problematic piece relating history and decisions of Chinese foreign policy. The review deduces that Kissinger's book is marred by his flattering picture of Chinese foreign policy, in which it is led by calculated, effective, master strategists. The articles also propose that Kissinger gave little consideration that Mao and Zhou were communists influenced by Mao's adaption of Marxist Ideology and Lenin which manifested in Chinese foreign policy and political structures. The review considered Kissinger to be "disappointingly vague" in the final parts of the book where he attempts to answer a question on future of American–Chinese relations: Will China's rise as a superpower inevitably pave a way to conflict with the U.S.? The review contends that rather than providing a definitive answer on how to avoid the repetition of conflict, Kissinger looks backward to the relationship of Germany and Britain a century ago.

Jasper Becker, a British author and commentator, criticised Kissinger's book for failing to address the key question "why and how did President Richard Nixon decide that it was in America's interests to protect communist China?". Becker contends that Kissinger failed to articulate why exactly America believed it had to protect China from a Chinese-Soviet war. Becker contests Kissinger's rationale behind backing China detailed in the book, suggesting the Soviet Union was a more expansionary, aggressive power. Becker believes China's decision to send troops to Korea, Vietnam, Burma and Cambodia, whilst financing the training of insurgents in other countries, exhibited parallel aggression to the Soviet Union. Additionally, the review deplored Kissinger's examination of Chinese leadership, saying that Kissinger accepted what Chinese leaders said and did at face value without challenge. Becker declared Kissinger "has no curiosity at all: he never looks behind the curtain". He believes the "Chinese couldn't believe their luck in finding such a naive and biddable partner as Kissinger".

== See also ==
- World Order
- Diplomacy (Kissinger book)
- Quotations from Chairman Mao Tse-tung
