= Jeremi Suri =

American historian

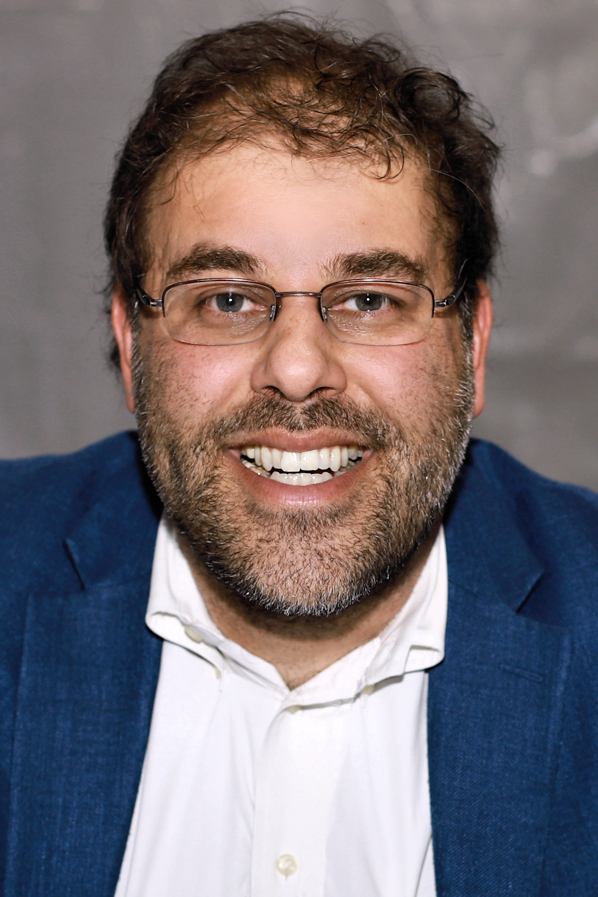
- Suri at the 2022 Texas Book Festival.
- Spouse: Alison Alter
- Children: 2

Academic background
- Education: Stanford University, A.B. 1994; Ohio University, M.A. 1996; Yale University, Ph.D. 2001
- Thesis: Convergent Responses to Disorder: Cultural Revolution and Détente among the Great Powers during the 1960s

Academic work
- Discipline: History
- Institutions: University of Texas at Austin; University of Wisconsin–Madison (2001–2011)
- Website: jeremisuri.net

Jeremi Suri is an American historian and the Mack Brown Distinguished Chair for Leadership in Global Affairs at the University of Texas at Austin.

== Early life and education ==
Suri graduated from Stanford University with a bachelor's in history in 1994. He then obtained a master's in history from Ohio University followed by a Ph.D. in history from Yale University. While at Yale, he wrote a dissertation titled "Convergent Responses to Disorder: Cultural Revolution and Détente among the Great Powers during the 1960s."

== Career ==
Suri has received many prizes for his teaching and research. In 2007, Smithsonian Magazine named him one of America's "Top Young Innovators" in the Arts and Sciences.

In 2012, Suri was named Mack Brown Distinguished Professor for Global Leadership, History, and Public Policy at the University of Texas at Austin. That year, he spoke at the independently organized TedxSMU event.

Suri is a frequent public lecturer and guest on radio and television programs. His writings appear widely in blogs and print media, including the journal Foreign Policy.

Suri has said that he is half Jewish and half Hindu.

== Works ==
=== Books ===
- Henry Kissinger and the American Century. Cambridge, Mass.: Harvard University Press (2009). ISBN 978-0674281943.
- Power and Protest: Global Revolution and the Rise of Detente. Cambridge, Mass.: Harvard University Press (2009). ISBN 978-0674044166.
- Liberty's Surest Guardian: Rebuilding Nations After War from the Founders to Obama. New York: Free Press (2012). ISBN 978-1439119136.
- The Impossible Presidency: The Rise and Fall of America's Highest Office. New York: Basic Books (2017). ISBN 978-0465093908.
- Civil War By Other Means: America's Long and Unfinished Fight For Democracy New York: Public Affairs (2022). ISBN 978-1541758544.

=== Selected articles ===
- "Hamilton Fish Armstrong, the 'American Establishment,' and Cosmopolitan Nationalism." Princeton University Library Chronicle, vol. 63, no. 3 (Spring 2002), pp. 438–65. doi:10.25290/prinunivlibrchro.63.3.0438. JSTOR 10.25290/prinunivlibrchro.63.3.0438.
- "Foreword: 'A Peace That Is No Peace': The Cold War as Contemporary History." OAH Magazine of History, vol. 24, no. 4 (October 2010), pp. 5–6. JSTOR 23210193.
- "Conflict and Co-Operation in the Cold War: New Directions in Contemporary Historical Research." Journal of Contemporary History, vol. 46, no. 1 (January 2011), pp. 5–9. JSTOR 25764606.
