= United States House of Representatives Office of Emergency Planning, Preparedness, and Operations =

Government agency

The Office of Emergency Planning, Preparedness and Operations (OEPPO) provides emergency planning and operational support to the United States House of Representatives. The Office was established by legislation in 2002, in the aftermath of the September 11 attacks to ensure continuity of government.

The office is responsible for House mitigation and preparedness operations, crisis management and response, and resource services and recovery operations. The director of OEPPO is jointly appointed by the speaker and minority leader. The speaker, in consultation with the minority leader, provides the policy direction and oversight of the office and may request a detail of personnel from any federal agency on a reimbursable basis. A director carries out the daily operations of the office under the supervision of the House of Representatives Continuity of Operations Board. Due to the sensitive nature of its mission, some of the agency's operational details are not publicly available.

The Office has conducted training on the use of personal protective equipment and emergency evacuation procedures and developed training plans to the House Staff on evacuation procedures for employees and visitors with disabilities. Following a TOPOFF 3 exercise in 2005, its provisions for evacuating persons with disabilities were questioned during a Congressional hearing.

== Budget ==
The Office's budget for salaries and expenses was $3,049,000 during fiscal year 2008.

== See also ==
- Office of Civil and Defense Mobilization
