= Duck Hook =

U.S. intelligence operation

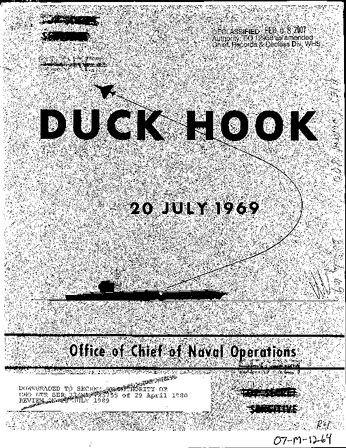
Cover page

Duck Hook (code-named "Pruning Knife" by the military) was the White House code-name of an operation President Richard Nixon had threatened to unleash against North Vietnam during the Vietnam War, if North Vietnam did not yield to Washington's terms at the Paris peace negotiations. Duck Hook called for the possible-nuclear bombing of military and economic targets in and around Hanoi, the mining of Haiphong harbor and other ports, saturation bombing of Hanoi and Haiphong, the bombing of dikes to destroy the food supply of much of the population of North Vietnam, air strikes against North Vietnam's northeast line of communications as well as passes and bridges at the Chinese border, and air and ground attacks on other targets throughout Vietnam.

== Nuclear weapons ==
US government documents later declassified reveal that nuclear weapons were considered for Operation Duck Hook. An attachment to a memo from US National Security Advisor Henry Kissinger to Nixon asked, "Should we be prepared to use nuclear weapons?" The memo warned that "Since we cannot confidently predict the exact point at which Hanoi could be likely to respond positively, we must be prepared to play out whatever string necessary." Kissinger's memo also stated that "To achieve its full effect on Hanoi's thinking, the action must be brutal." [emphasis in original]

A few days earlier, a document from two of Kissinger's aides, Roger Morris and Anthony Lake, stated that the President must be prepared "to decide beforehand, the fateful question of how far we will go. He cannot, for example, confront the issue of using tactical nuclear weapons in the midst of the exercise. He must be prepared to play out whatever string necessary in this case."

== The ultimatum ==
In a secret Paris meeting in early August 1969, Kissinger presented to the Vietnamese the US ultimatum to unleash what the US secretly called Duck Hook:

"If by November 1 no major progress has been made toward a solution, we will be compelled—with great reluctance—to take measures of the greatest consequence."

== Abandoned ==
By October 17, Kissinger recommended against carrying out Operation Duck Hook. On 1 November 1969, Nixon himself decided to abandon it. This was reportedly because:

- there were reservations about Duck Hook's potential effectiveness;
- public support for the war continued to decline;
- there were signs of political slippage; and
- Defense Secretary Melvin Laird and Secretary of State William P. Rogers opposed military escalation.

At the same time that he cancelled Duck Hook, it seems that Nixon embarked on a new strategy to start a "series of increased [nuclear] alert measures designed to convey to the Soviets an increasing readiness by U.S. strategic forces," according to Kissinger aide Alexander Haig.
