= Congress of Vienna =

1814–1815 meetings to create a peace plan for Europe

Coordinates: 48.2085°N 16.3638°E

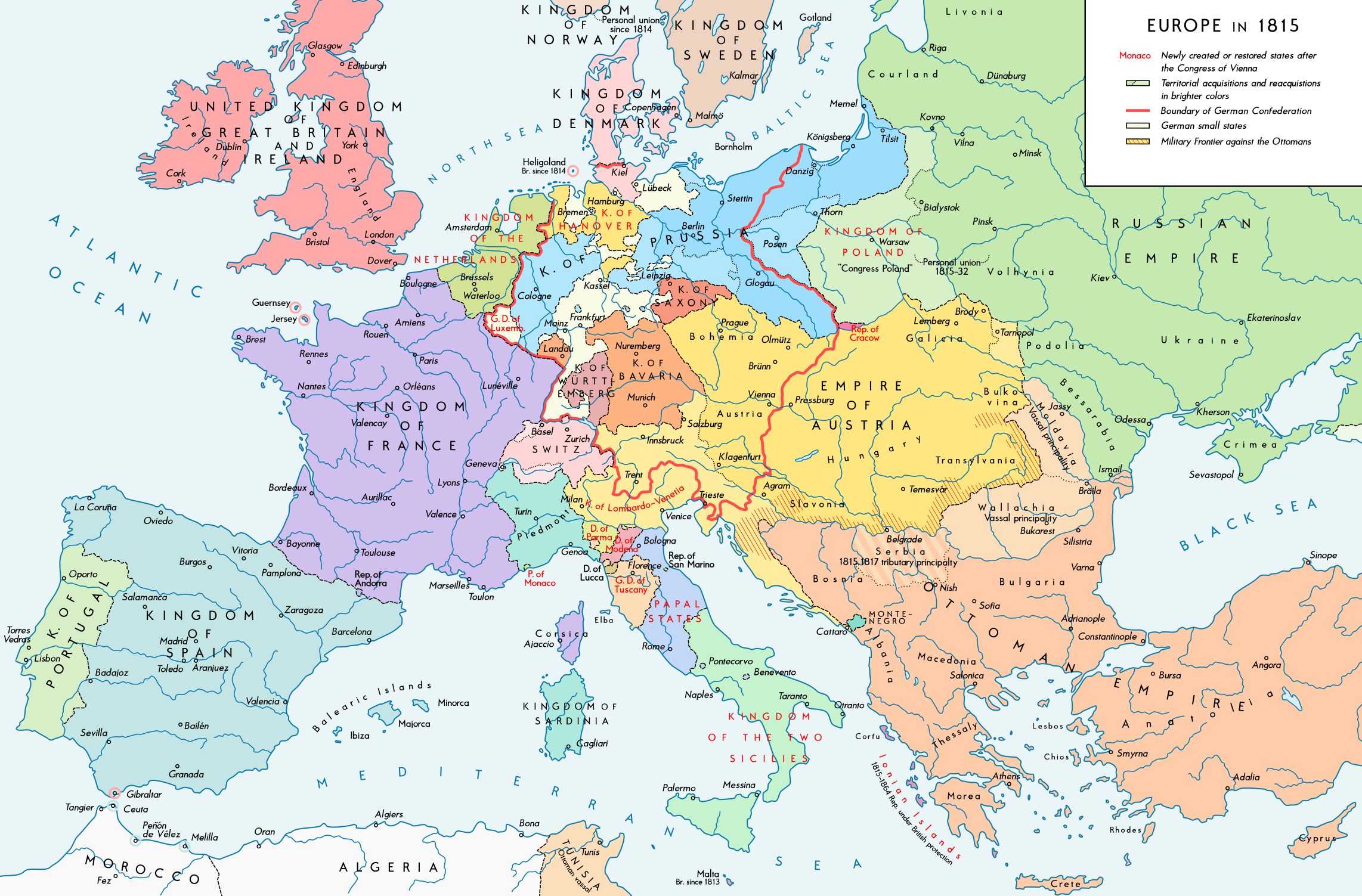
The national boundaries within Europe agreed upon by the Congress of Vienna

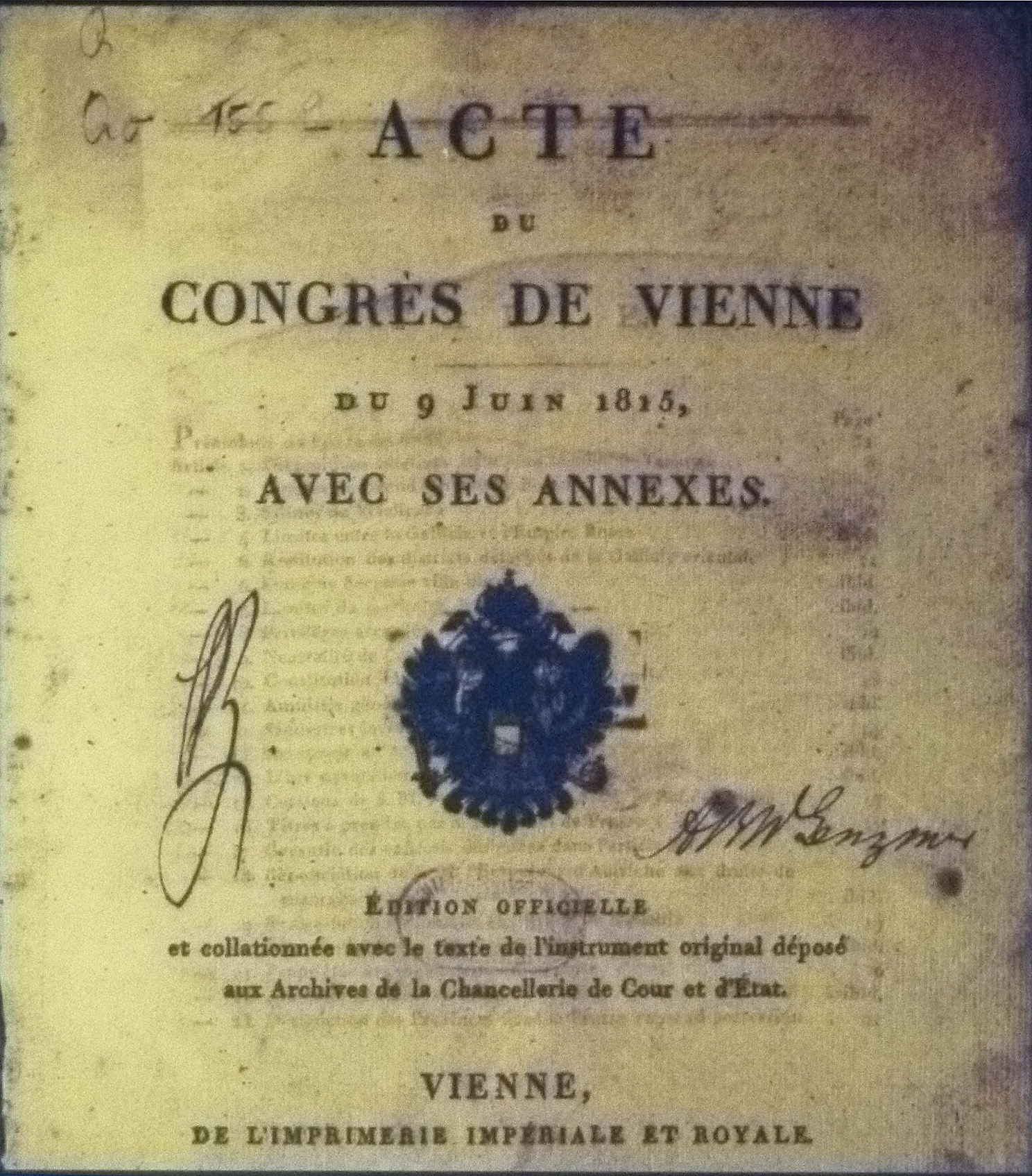
Frontispiece of the Acts of the Congress of Vienna

The Congress of Vienna (Note: French: Congrès de Vienne; German: Wiener Kongress) of 1814–1815 was a series of international diplomatic meetings to discuss and agree upon a possible new layout of the European political and constitutional order after the downfall of the French emperor Napoleon Bonaparte. Participants were representatives of all European powers (other than the Ottoman Empire) (Note: Although the Ottoman Empire was officially invited by Robert Liston and Klemens von Metternich to actively participate in the Congress on topics such as the Russo–Turkish conflicts, Sultan Mahmud II did not send a delegation. Thus, the country was the only power in Europe to abstain from the Congress.) and other stakeholders. The Congress was chaired by Austrian statesman Klemens von Metternich (Duke Metternich) and was held in Vienna from September 1814 to June 1815.

The objective of the Congress was to provide a long-term peace plan for Europe by settling critical issues arising from the French Revolutionary Wars and the Napoleonic Wars through negotiation. The goal was not simply to restore old boundaries, but to resize the main powers so they could balance each other and remain at peace, being at the same time shepherds for the smaller powers. More generally, conservative leaders like Metternich also sought to restrain or eliminate Bonapartist, republican, liberal, and revolutionary movements which, from their point of view, had upended the constitutional order of the European ancien régime.

At the negotiation table, the position of France was weaker than those of the United Kingdom, Prussia, Austrian Empire, and the Russian Empire, partly due to Napoleon's recent defeat. In the eventual settlement, France had to give up all of Napoleon's conquests (while keeping certain territories conquered before his seizure of power), while the other three main powers made major territorial gains around the world. Prussia added territory from smaller states: Swedish Pomerania, most of the Kingdom of Saxony, and the western part of the former Duchy of Warsaw. Austria gained much of northern Italy. Russia added the central and eastern parts of the Duchy of Warsaw. All agreed upon ratifying the creation of the new Kingdom of the Netherlands, which had been created just months before from the former Dutch Seven Provinces together with formerly Austrian territory, and was meant to serve as a buffer between the German Confederation and France.

The immediate background was Napoleonic France's defeat and surrender in May 1814, which brought an end to 23 years of nearly continuous war. Remarkably, negotiations continued unaffected despite the outbreak of fighting triggered by Napoleon's return from exile and resumption of power in France during the Hundred Days of March to July 1815. The Congress's agreement was signed nine days before Napoleon's final defeat at Waterloo on 18 June 1815.

Some historians have criticised the outcomes of the Congress for causing the subsequent suppression of national, democratic, and liberal movements, and it has been seen as a reactionary settlement for the benefit of traditional monarchs. Others have praised the Congress for protecting Europe from large and widespread wars for almost a century.

== The Congress format ==
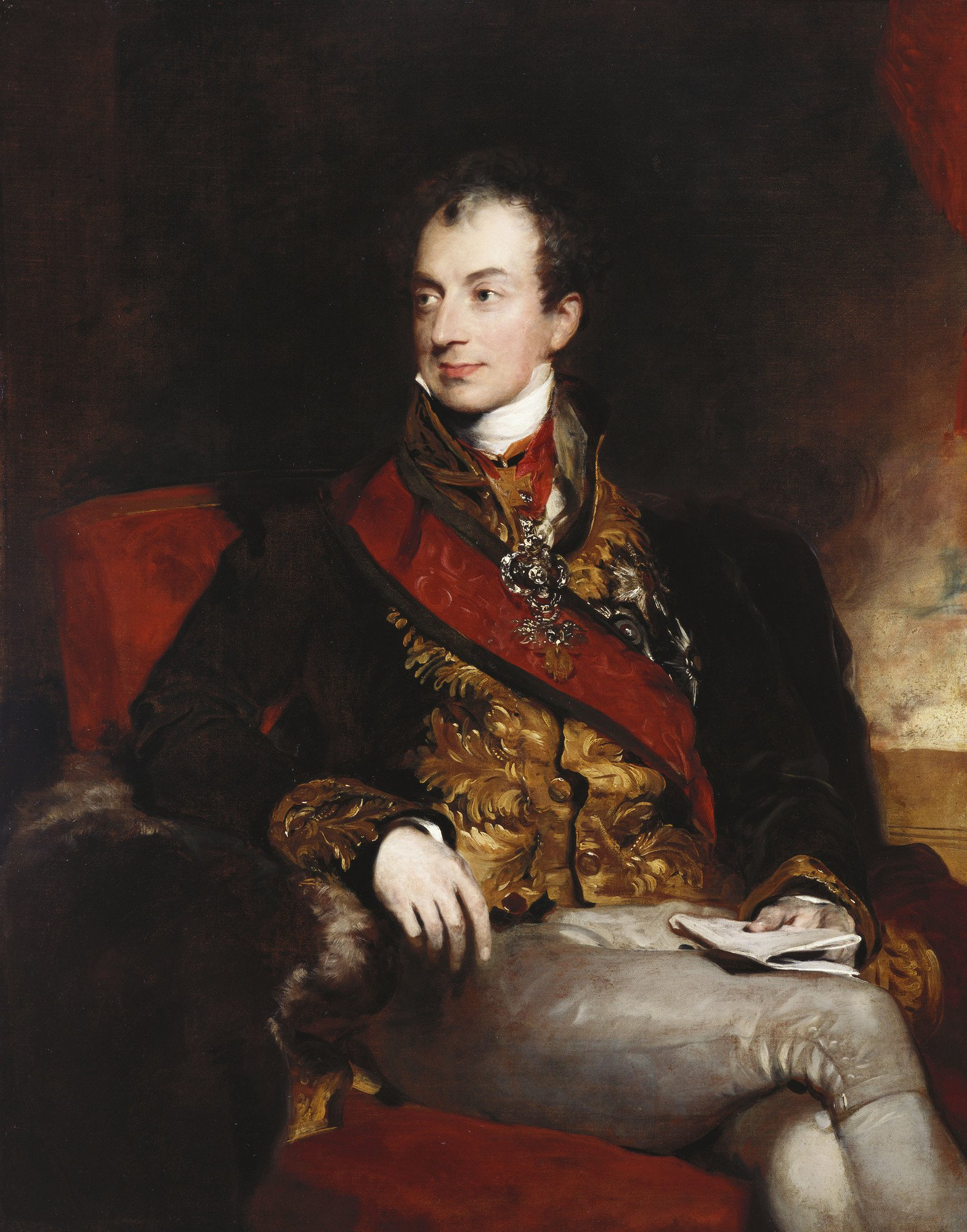
Architect of the Congress System, Prince von Metternich, chancellor of the Austrian Empire from 1821 until the Revolution in 1848. Painting by Lawrence (1815)

The name "Congress of Vienna" was not meant to suggest a formal plenary session, but rather the creation of a diplomatic organizational framework bringing together stakeholders of all flocks to enable the expression of opinions, interests and sentiments and facilitate discussion of general issues among them. The Congress format had been developed by Austrian Foreign Minister Klemens von Metternich, assisted by Friedrich von Gentz, and was the first occasion in history where, on a continental scale, national representatives and other stakeholders came together in one city at the same time to discuss and formulate the conditions and provisions of treaties. Before the Congress of Vienna the common method of diplomacy involved the exchange of notes sent back and forth among the several capitals and separate talks in different places, a cumbersome process that required much in the way of time and transportation. The format set at the Congress of Vienna would serve as inspiration for the 1856 peace conference brokered by France (the Congress of Paris) that settled the Crimean War. The Congress of Vienna settlement gave birth to the Concert of Europe, an international political doctrine that emphasized the maintaining of political boundaries, the balance of powers, and respecting spheres of influence and which guided foreign policy among the nations of Europe until the outbreak of the First World War in 1914.

To reach amiable consensus among the many different nations holding great interest in the settlement proceedings, informal, face-to-face deliberative sessions were held where opinions and proposed solutions could be inventoried. The policy work on which the Concert of Europe was built on came about through closed-doors dealing among the five Great Powers – Austria, Britain, Russia, Prussia and France. The first four of the five dominant peacemakers held sway simply because they brought to the table "negotiating power" that came of hard-won victory in the Napoleonic Wars; France enjoyed her advantageous position largely through the brilliant diplomatic maneuvering by senior statesman Talleyrand. Lesser powers, like Spain, Sweden, and Portugal, were given few opportunities to advocate their interests and only occasionally partook in the meetings held between the great powers. However, because all representatives were gathered in one city it was relatively easy to communicate, to hear and spread news and gossip, and to present points of view for both powerful and less powerful nations. Also of great importance to the parties convened in Vienna were the opportunities presented at wine and dinner functions to establish formal relationships with one another and build up diplomatic networks.

== Preliminaries ==
The Treaty of Chaumont in 1814 had reaffirmed decisions that had been made already and that would be ratified by the more important Congress of Vienna. They included the establishment of a confederated Germany, the division of Italy into independent states, the restoration of the Bourbon kings of Spain, and the enlargement of the Netherlands to include what in 1830 became modern Belgium. The Treaty of Chaumont became the cornerstone of the European Alliance that formed the balance of power for decades.

Other partial settlements had already occurred at the Treaty of Paris between France and the Sixth Coalition, and the Treaty of Kiel that covered issues raised regarding Scandinavia. The Treaty of Paris had determined that a "general congress" should be held in Vienna and that invitations would be issued to "all the Powers engaged on either side in the present war". The opening was scheduled for July 1814.

== Participants ==
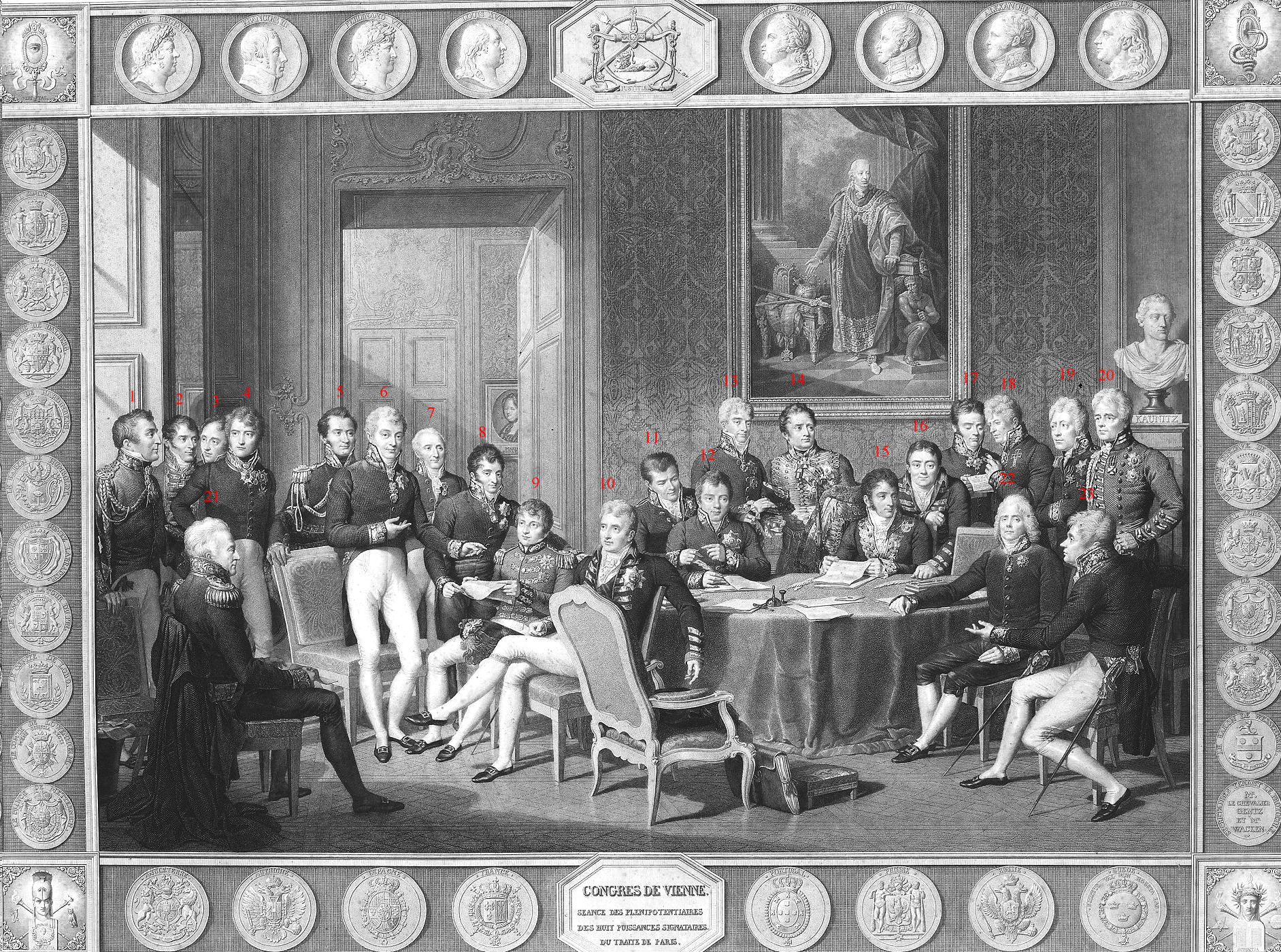
Delegates of the Congress of Vienna in a contemporary engraving by Jean Godefroy after the painting by Jean-Baptiste Isabey: 1. Britain: Arthur Wellesley, 1st Duke of Wellington; 2. Portugal: Joaquim Lobo Silveira, 7th Count of Oriola; 3. Portugal: António de Saldanha da Gama, Count of Porto Santo; 4. Sweden: Count Carl Löwenhielm; 5. France: Louis Joseph Alexis, Comte de Noailles; 6. Austria: Klemens Wenzel, Prince von Metternich; 7. France: Frédéric-Séraphin de La Tour du Pin Gouvernet; 8. Russia: Count Karl Robert Nesselrode; 9. Portugal: Pedro de Sousa Holstein, 1st Count of Palmela; 10. Britain: Robert Stewart, Viscount Castlereagh; 11. France: Emmerich Joseph, Duke of Dalberg; 12. Austria: Baron Johann von Wessenberg; 13. Russia: Prince Andrey Kirillovich Razumovsky; 14. Britain: Charles Stewart, 1st Baron Stewart; 15. Spain: Pedro Gómez Labrador, 1st Marquess of Labrador; 16. Britain: Richard Le Poer Trench, 2nd Earl of Clancarty; 17. Nikolaus von Wacken (Recorder); 18. Austria: Friedrich von Gentz (Congress Secretary); 19. Prussia: Baron Wilhelm von Humboldt; 20. Britain: William Cathcart, 1st Earl Cathcart; 21. Prussia: Prince Karl August von Hardenberg; 22. France: Charles Maurice de Talleyrand-Périgord; 23. Russia: Count Gustav Ernst von Stackelberg

The Congress functioned through formal meetings such as working groups and official diplomatic functions; however, a large portion of the Congress was conducted informally at salons, banquets, and balls.

=== The four great powers and Bourbon France ===
Four great powers had previously formed the core of the Sixth Coalition, a covenant of nations allied in the war against France. On the verge of Napoleon's defeat they had outlined their common position in the Treaty of Chaumont (March 1814), and negotiated the Treaty of Paris (1814) with the Bourbons during their restoration:

- Austria was represented by Prince von Metternich, the Foreign Minister, and by his deputy, Baron Johann von Wessenberg. The Austrians sought to maintain the balance of power, while protecting the interests of the Conservative nations and rebuilding Austria's position diplomatically in Germany and Italy. As the Congress's sessions were in Vienna, Emperor Francis was kept closely informed.
- The United Kingdom was represented first by its Foreign Secretary, Viscount Castlereagh; then by the Duke of Wellington, after Castlereagh's return to England in February 1815. The United Kingdom wanted to prevent the return of France as a superpower (and stop Russia from attaining that status). It also sought to promote the balance of power by protecting the rights of smaller nations. In the last weeks it was headed by the Earl of Clancarty, after Wellington left to face Napoleon during the Hundred Days.
- Tsar Alexander I controlled the Russian delegation which was formally led by the foreign minister, Count Karl Robert Nesselrode. The tsar had two main goals, to gain control of Poland and to promote the peaceful coexistence of European nations, with Russia as the pre-eminent land power. He succeeded in forming the Holy Alliance (1815), based on monarchism and anti-secularism, and formed to combat any threat of revolution or republicanism.
- Prussia was represented by Prince Karl August von Hardenberg, the Chancellor, and the diplomat and scholar Wilhelm von Humboldt. The Prussians wanted to strengthen their position in Germany, particularly by annexing all of Saxony and parts of the Ruhr. King Frederick William III of Prussia was also in Vienna, playing his role behind the scenes.
- France, the "fifth" power, was represented by its foreign minister, Charles-Maurice de Talleyrand-Périgord, 1st Duke of Benevento, as well as the Minister Plenipotentiary, Emmerich Joseph de Dalberg, 1st Duke of Dalberg. Talleyrand had already negotiated the Treaty of Paris (1814) for Louis XVIII. He sought to ensure that France rejoined the group of Great Powers, and avoided being dismembered by the occupying powers. Louis XVIII, however, distrusted him and was also secretly negotiating with Metternich, by mail.

=== The lesser powers, parties to the Treaty of Paris, 1814 ===
These parties had not been part of the Chaumont agreement, but had joined the Treaty of Paris (1814):

- Spain – Don Pedro Gómez de Labrador, 1st Marquess of Labrador
- Portugal – Plenipotentiaries: Pedro de Sousa Holstein, Count of Palmela; António de Saldanha da Gama, Count of Porto Santo; Joaquim Lobo da Silveira.
- Sweden – Count Carl Löwenhielm

=== Other nations ===
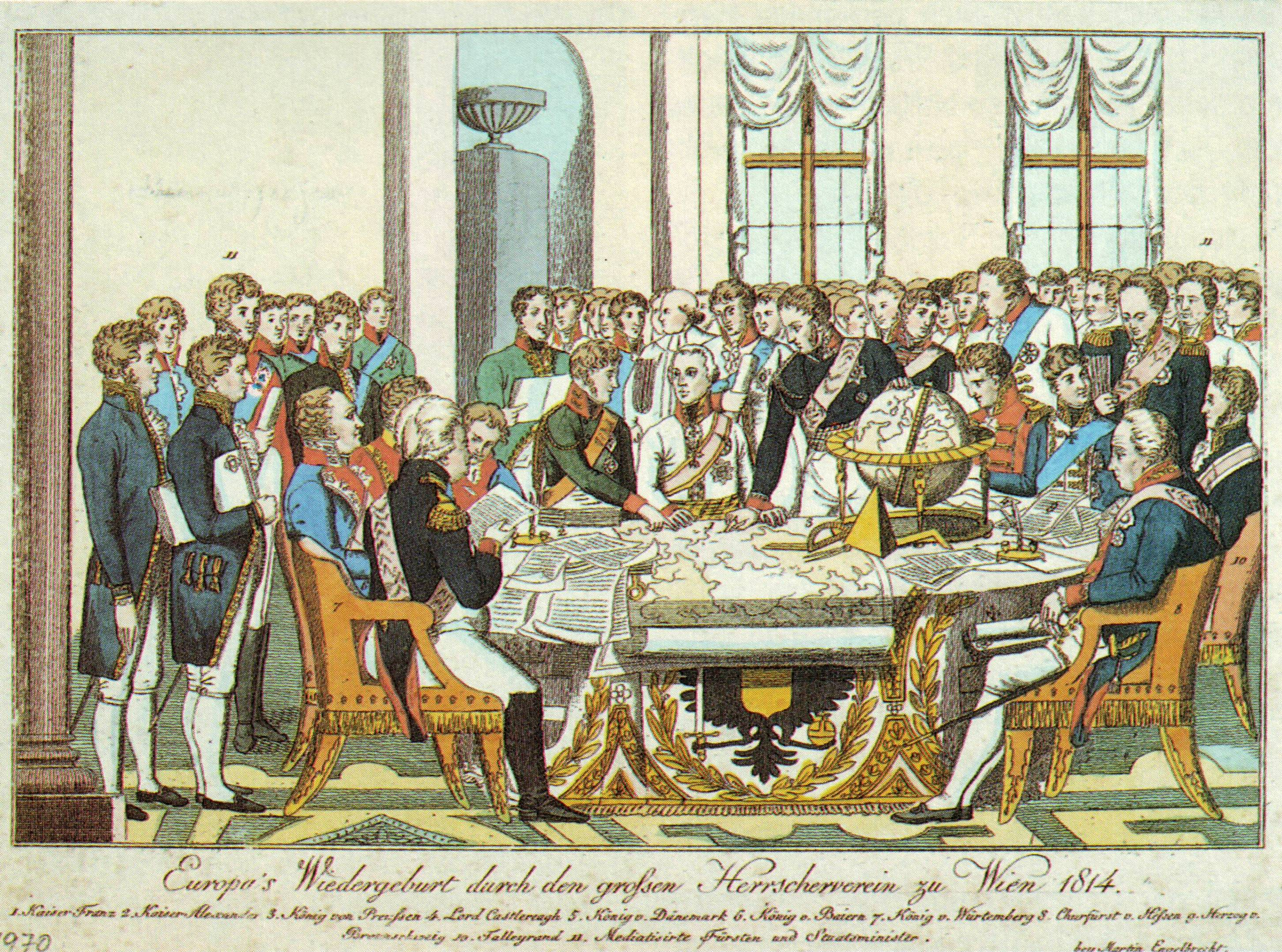
Negotiations at the Congress of Vienna

- Denmark – Count Niels Rosenkrantz, foreign minister. King Frederick VI was also present in Vienna.
- Netherlands – Earl of Clancarty, the British Ambassador at the Dutch court, and Baron Hans von Gagern
- Switzerland – Every canton had its own delegation. Charles Pictet de Rochemont from Geneva played a prominent role.
- Kingdom of Sardinia – Marquis Filippo Antonio Asinari di San Marzano.
- The Papal States – Ercole Cardinal Consalvi, Secretary of State of His Holiness
- The Order of St. John of Malta – Fra' Antonio Miari, Fra' Daniello Berlinghieri and Fra' Augusto Viè de Cesarini
- Republic of Genoa – Marquise Agostino Pareto, Senator of the Republic.
- Grand Duchy of Tuscany – Neri Corsini.
- Kingdom of Sicily – Alvaro Ruffo della Scaletta, Luigi de' Medici di Ottajano, Antonio Maresca di Serracapriola and Fabrizio Ruffo di Castelcicala
- On German issues:
  - Bavaria – Maximilian Graf von Montgelas
  - Württemberg – Georg Ernst Levin von Wintzingerode
  - Hanover, then in a personal union with the British crown – Graf Ernst zu Münster. (King George III had refused to recognize the dissolution of the Holy Roman Empire in 1806 and maintained a separate diplomatic staff as Elector of Hanover to conduct the affairs of the family estate, the Duchy of Brunswick-Lüneburg, until the results of the Congress were concluded establishing the Kingdom of Hanover.)
  - Mecklenburg-Schwerin – Leopold von Plessen

== Other stakeholders ==
Virtually every state in Europe had a delegation in Vienna – more than 200 states and princely houses were represented at the Congress. In addition, there were representatives of cities, corporations, religious organizations (for instance, abbeys) and special interest groups – e.g., a delegation representing German publishers, demanding a copyright law and freedom of the press. With them came a host of courtiers, secretaries, civil servants and ladies to enjoy the social life of the Austrian court. The Congress was noted for its lavish entertainment: according to a famous joke of the Prince of Ligne, it danced a lot but did not move forward. On the other hand, the possibilities for informal gatherings created by this "side program" may have helped ensure the Congress's success.

== Diplomatic tactics ==
=== Talleyrand (France) ===
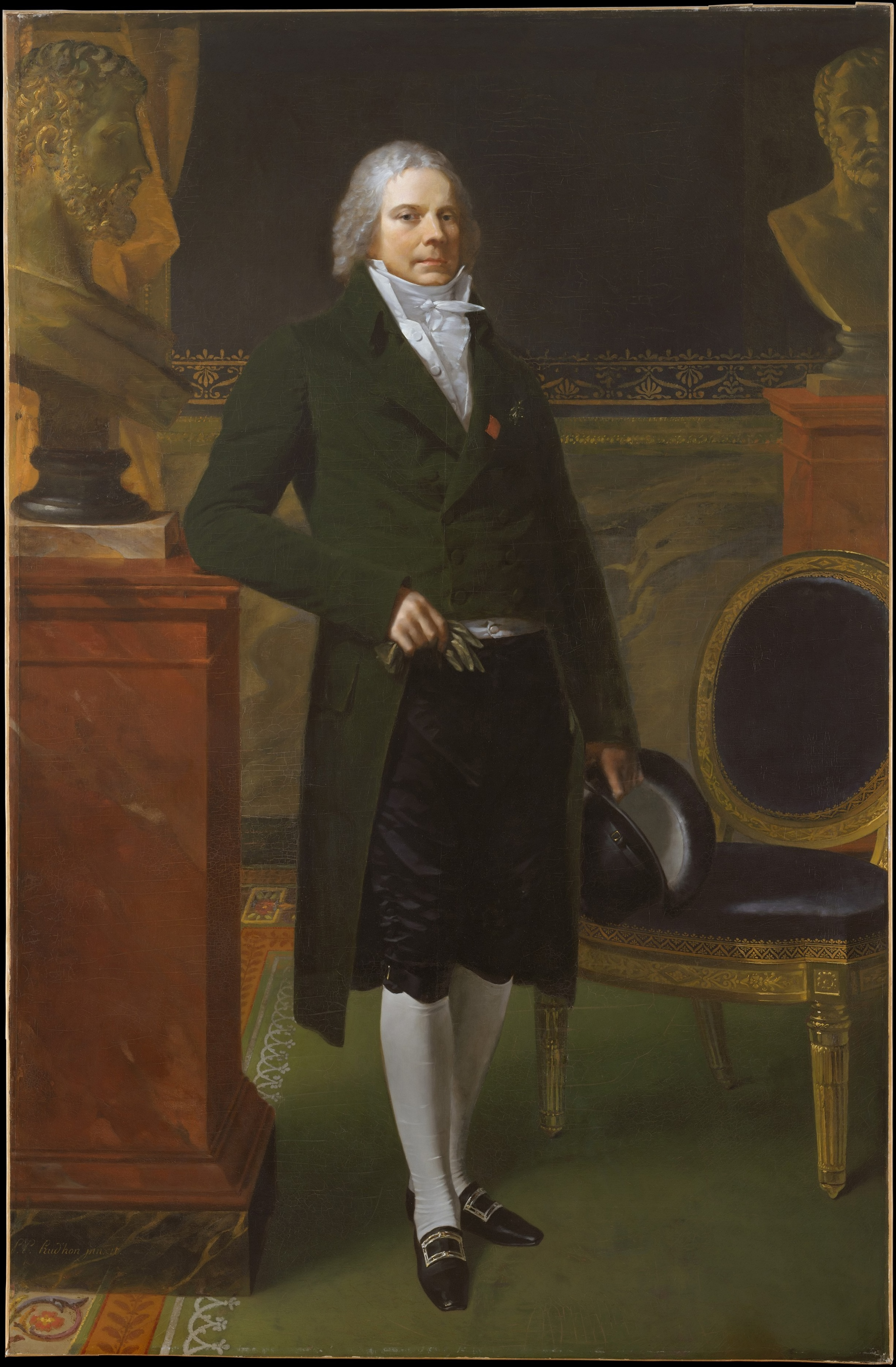
Talleyrand proved an able negotiator for the defeated French.

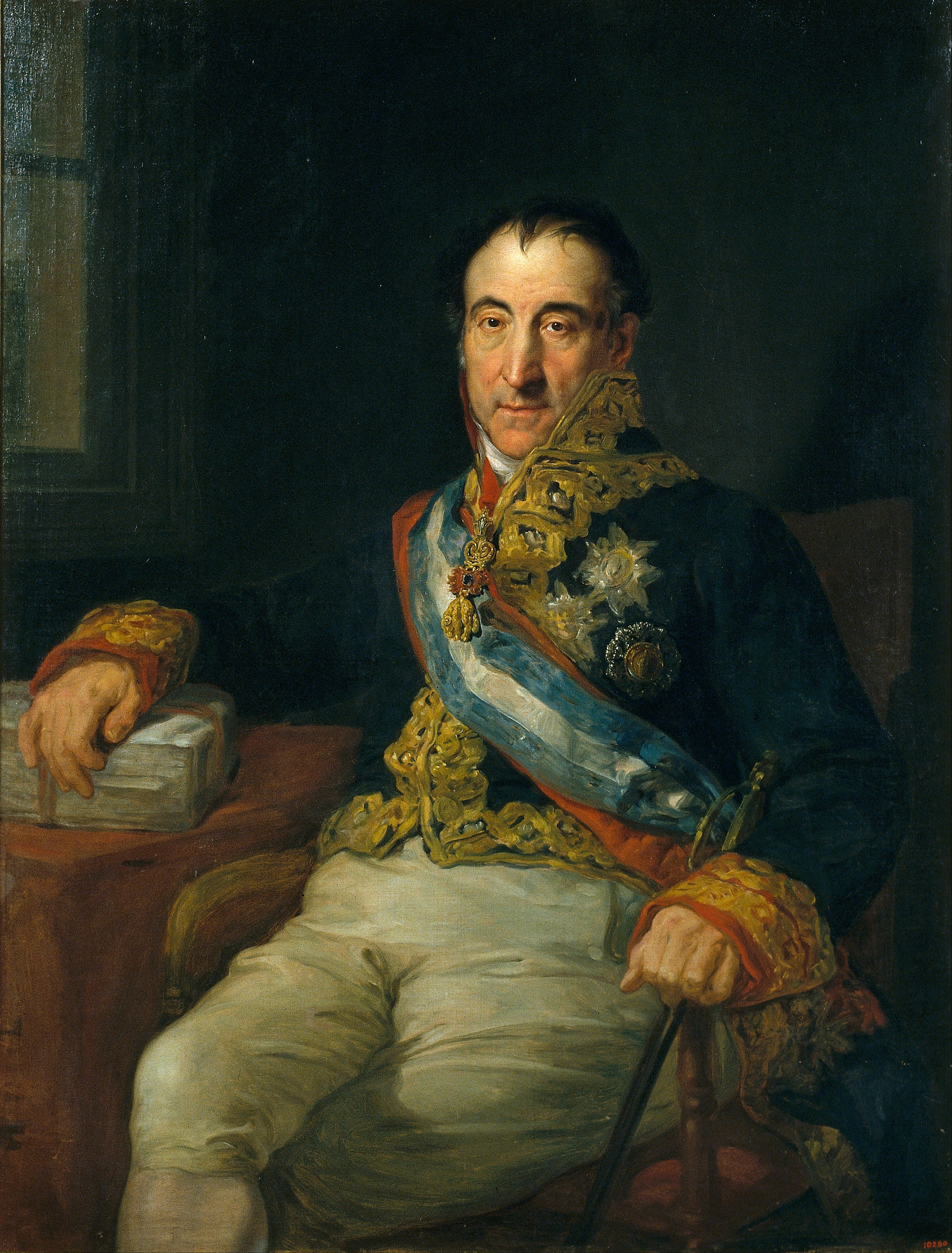
Marquis of Labrador, Spanish Ambassador to the Congress of Vienna – painting by Vicente López Portaña

Initially, the representatives of the four victorious powers hoped to exclude the French from serious participation in the negotiations, but Talleyrand skillfully managed to insert himself into "her inner councils" in the first weeks of negotiations. He allied himself to a Committee of Eight lesser powers (including Spain, Sweden, and Portugal) to control the negotiations. Once Talleyrand was able to use this committee to make himself a part of the inner negotiations, he then left it, once again abandoning his allies.

The major Allies' indecision on how to conduct their affairs without provoking a united protest from the lesser powers led to the calling of a preliminary conference on the protocol, to which Talleyrand and the Marquess of Labrador, Spain's representative, were invited on 30 September 1814.

Congress Secretary Friedrich von Gentz reported, "The intervention of Talleyrand and Labrador has hopelessly upset all our plans. Talleyrand protested against the procedure we have adopted and soundly [be]rated us for two hours. It was a scene I shall never forget." The embarrassed representatives of the Allies replied that the document concerning the protocol they had arranged actually meant nothing. "If it means so little, why did you sign it?" snapped Labrador.

Talleyrand's policy, directed as much by national as personal ambitions, demanded the close but by no means amicable relationship he had with Labrador, whom Talleyrand regarded with disdain. Labrador later remarked of Talleyrand: "that cripple, unfortunately, is going to Vienna." Talleyrand skirted additional articles suggested by Labrador: he had no intention of handing over the 12,000 afrancesados – Spanish fugitives, sympathetic to France, who had sworn fealty to Joseph Bonaparte, nor the bulk of the documents, paintings, pieces of fine art, and books that had been looted from the archives, palaces, churches and cathedrals of Spain.

=== Polish-Saxon questions ===
The most complex topic at the Congress was the Polish-Saxon Crisis. Russia wanted most of Poland, and Prussia wanted all of Saxony, whose king had allied with Napoleon. The tsar had wanted to become king of Poland. Austria concluded that this would make Russia too powerful – a view which was supported by Britain. The result was a deadlock, for which Talleyrand proposed a solution: admit France to the inner circle, and France would support Austria and Britain. The three nations signed a treaty on 3 January 1815, among only the three of them, agreeing to go to war against Russia and Prussia, if necessary, to prevent the Russo-Prussian plan from coming to fruition.

When the Tsar heard of the treaty he agreed to a compromise that satisfied all parties on 24 October 1815. Russia received most of the Napoleonic Duchy of Warsaw as a "Kingdom of Poland" – called Congress Poland, with the tsar as a king ruling it independently of Russia. However, the majority of Greater Poland and Kuyavia, as well as the Chełmno Land, were given to Prussia and mostly included within the newly formed Grand Duchy of Posen (Poznań), while Kraków became a free city as a shared protectorate of Austria, Prussia and Russia. Furthermore, the tsar was forbidden from uniting his new realm with the parts of Poland that had been incorporated into Russia in the 1790s. Prussia received 60 percent of Saxony, much of which became part of the new Province of Saxony from 1816 (the now-Prussian parts of Lower Lusatia and some other areas instead became part of the Province of Brandenburg, with Prussian Upper Lusatia becoming part of the Province of Silesia by 1825); the remainder of Saxony returned to King Frederick Augustus I as his Kingdom of Saxony.

=== Bribery ===
It can be learned from the diaries of the master of affairs Von Gentz that diplomatic tactics possibly included bribing. He notes that at the Congress he received £22,000 through Talleyrand from Louis XVIII, while Castlereagh gave him £600, accompanied by "les plus folles promesses" ("the wildest promises"); his diary is full of such entries.

== Final agreement ==
In red: territories left to France in 1814, but removed after the Treaty of Paris

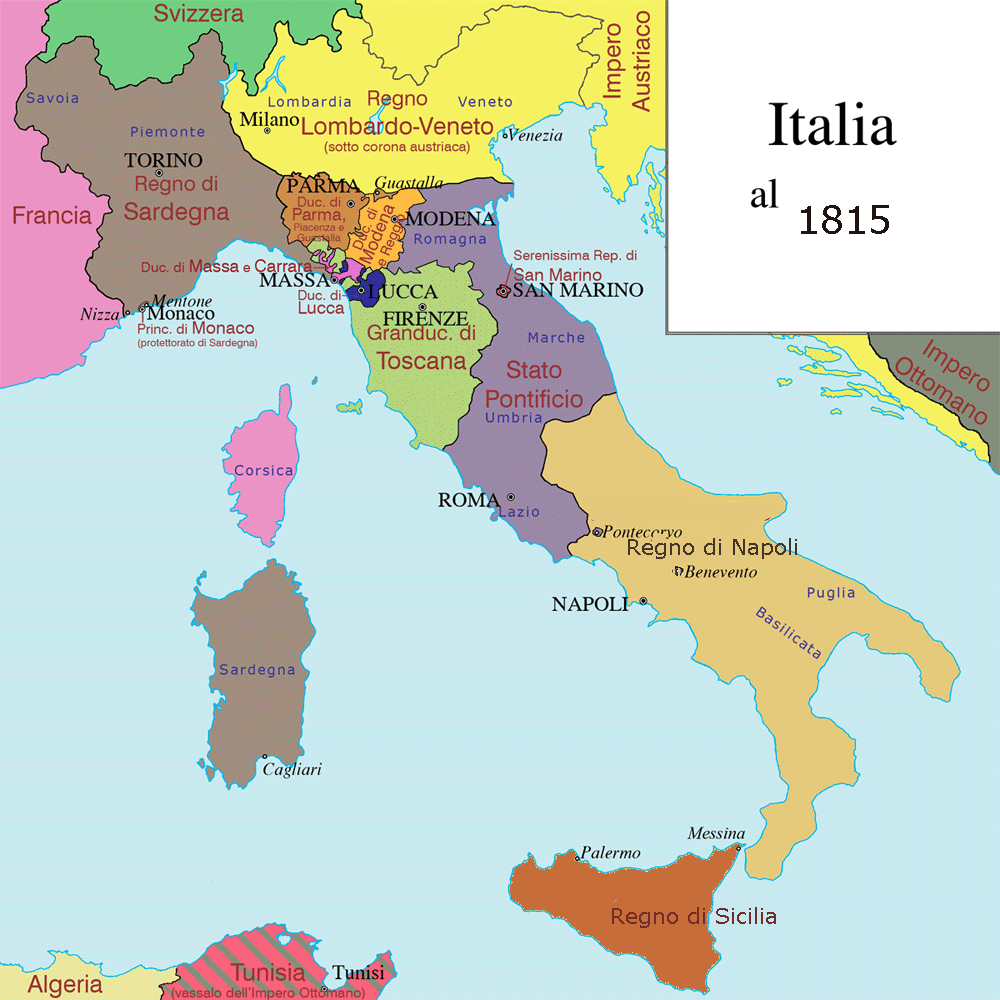
Italian states after the Congress of Vienna with Austrian-annexed territories shown in yellow

The Final Act, embodying all the separate treaties, was signed on 9 June 1815 (nine days before the Battle of Waterloo). Its provisions included:

- Most of the Duchy of Warsaw, except for the provinces that were part of Austria and Prussia, became part of an independent Kingdom of Poland. The King of Poland was Czar Alexander. This was supposed to be a largely ceremonial role as he was supposed to be tightly constrained by a constitution. Practically, though, Poland got swallowed up by Russian influence (Czar Nicholas I, who ruled Russia after Alexander said he did not feel bound by the constitution).
- In addition to their role in Poland, Russia retained Finland (which it had annexed from Sweden in 1809 and would hold until 1917, as the Grand Duchy of Finland).
- Prussia received three-fifths of Saxony, western parts of the Duchy of Warsaw (most of which became part of the newly formed Grand Duchy of Posen), Gdańsk (Danzig), the Grand Duchy of the Lower Rhine (merger of the former French departments of Rhin-et-Moselle, Sarre, and Roer), and the Province of Jülich-Cleves-Berg (itself a merger of the former Prussian Guelders, the Principality of Moers, and the Grand Duchy of Berg).
- A German Confederation of 39 states, under the presidency of the Austrian Emperor, formed from the previous 300 states of the Holy Roman Empire. Only portions of the territories of Austria and Prussia were included in the Confederation (roughly the same portions that had been within the Holy Roman Empire).
- The Netherlands and the Southern Netherlands (approximately modern-day Belgium) became a united monarchy, the United Kingdom of the Netherlands, with the House of Orange-Nassau providing the king (the Eight Articles of London).
- To compensate for Orange-Nassau's loss of the Nassau lands to Prussia, the United Kingdom of the Netherlands and the Grand Duchy of Luxembourg were to form a personal union under the House of Orange-Nassau, with Luxembourg (but not the Netherlands) inside the German Confederation.
- Swedish Pomerania, given to Denmark in January 1814 in return for the Kingdom of Norway, was sold to Prussia. France received back Guadeloupe from Sweden, with yearly installments payable to the Swedish king.
- The neutrality of the 22 cantons of Switzerland was guaranteed and a federal pact was recommended to them in strong terms. Bienne and the Prince-Bishopric of Basel became part of the Canton of Bern. The Congress also suggested a number of compromises for resolving territorial disputes between cantons.
- The former Electorate of Hanover was expanded to a kingdom. It gave up the Duchy of Lauenburg to the Kingdom of Denmark, but gained former territories of the Bishop of Münster and formerly Prussian East Frisia.
- Most of the territorial gains of Bavaria, Württemberg, Baden, Hesse-Darmstadt, and Nassau under the mediatizations of 1801–1806 were recognized. Bavaria also gained control of the Rhenish Palatinate and of parts of the Napoleonic Duchy of Würzburg and Grand Duchy of Frankfurt. Hesse-Darmstadt, in exchange for giving up the Duchy of Westphalia to Prussia, received Rhenish Hesse with its capital at Mainz.
- Austria regained control of the Tyrol and Salzburg; of the former Illyrian Provinces; of Tarnopol district (from Russia); and received Lombardy–Venetia in Italy and Ragusa in Dalmatia. Former Austrian territory in Southwest Germany remained under the control of Württemberg and Baden; the Austrian Netherlands were also not recovered.
- Ferdinand III was restored as Grand Duke of Tuscany.
- Archduke Francis IV was acknowledged as the ruler of the Duchy of Modena, Reggio and Mirandola.
- Maria Beatrice d'Este was restored as Duchess of Massa and Princess of Carrara, and the Imperial fiefs in Lunigiana, which were not re-established, were also bestowed upon her.
- The Papal States under the rule of the Pope were restored to their former extent, with the exception of Avignon and the Comtat Venaissin, which remained part of France.
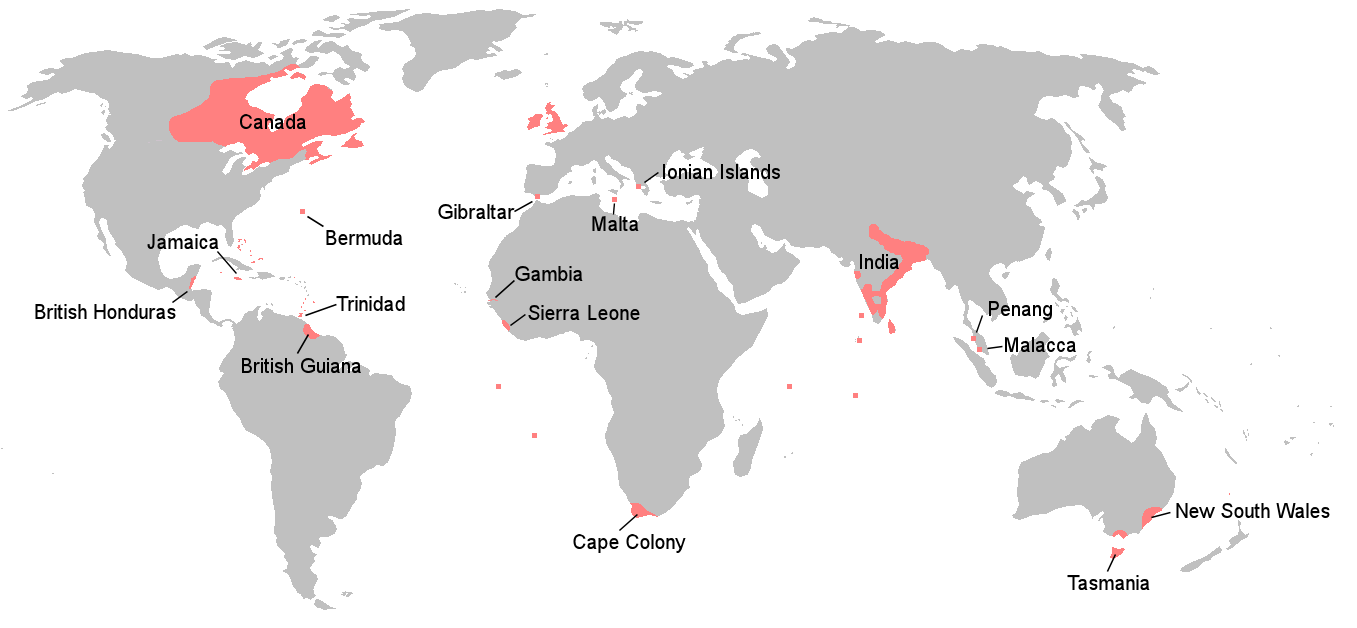
  The British Empire at the end of the Napoleonic Wars in 1815
- Britain retained control of the Cape Colony in southern Africa; Tobago; Ceylon; and various other colonies in Africa and Asia. Other colonies, most notably the Dutch East Indies and Martinique, reverted to their previous overlords.
- The King of Sardinia, re-established in Piedmont, Nice, and Savoy, gained control of Genoa (putting an end to the brief proclamation of a restored Republic of Genoa).
- The Duchies of Parma, Piacenza and Guastalla were taken from the House of Bourbon-Parma and given to Marie Louise of Austria for her lifetime.
- The Duchy of Lucca was established temporarily as compensation for the House of Bourbon-Parma (with reversionary rights to Parma after the death of Marie Louise, which were attributed through a collateral treaty in 1817, also stipulating that, from the same date, the Duchy of Lucca would in turn be annexed by the Grand Duchy of Tuscany, as already provided in the Final Act).
- The slave trade was condemned.
- Freedom of navigation was guaranteed for many rivers, notably the Rhine and the Danube.

Representatives of Austria, France, Portugal, Prussia, Russia, Sweden-Norway, and Britain signed the Final Act.

Spain did not sign because of:

- Austria's aggressive grab of influence in northern Italy.
- The overall lack of involvement by the non-great power nations.
- Relatively low reparation payments from France (100 million francs for each of the great powers, but only 5 million for Spain, who suffered the most from Napoleon due to fierce fighting in the Peninsula War).

Spain ended up signing the treaty in 1817. Subsequently, Ferdinand IV, the Bourbon King of Sicily, regained control of the Kingdom of Naples after Joachim Murat, the king installed by Bonaparte, supported Napoleon in the Hundred Days and started the 1815 Neapolitan War by attacking Austria.

== Other changes ==
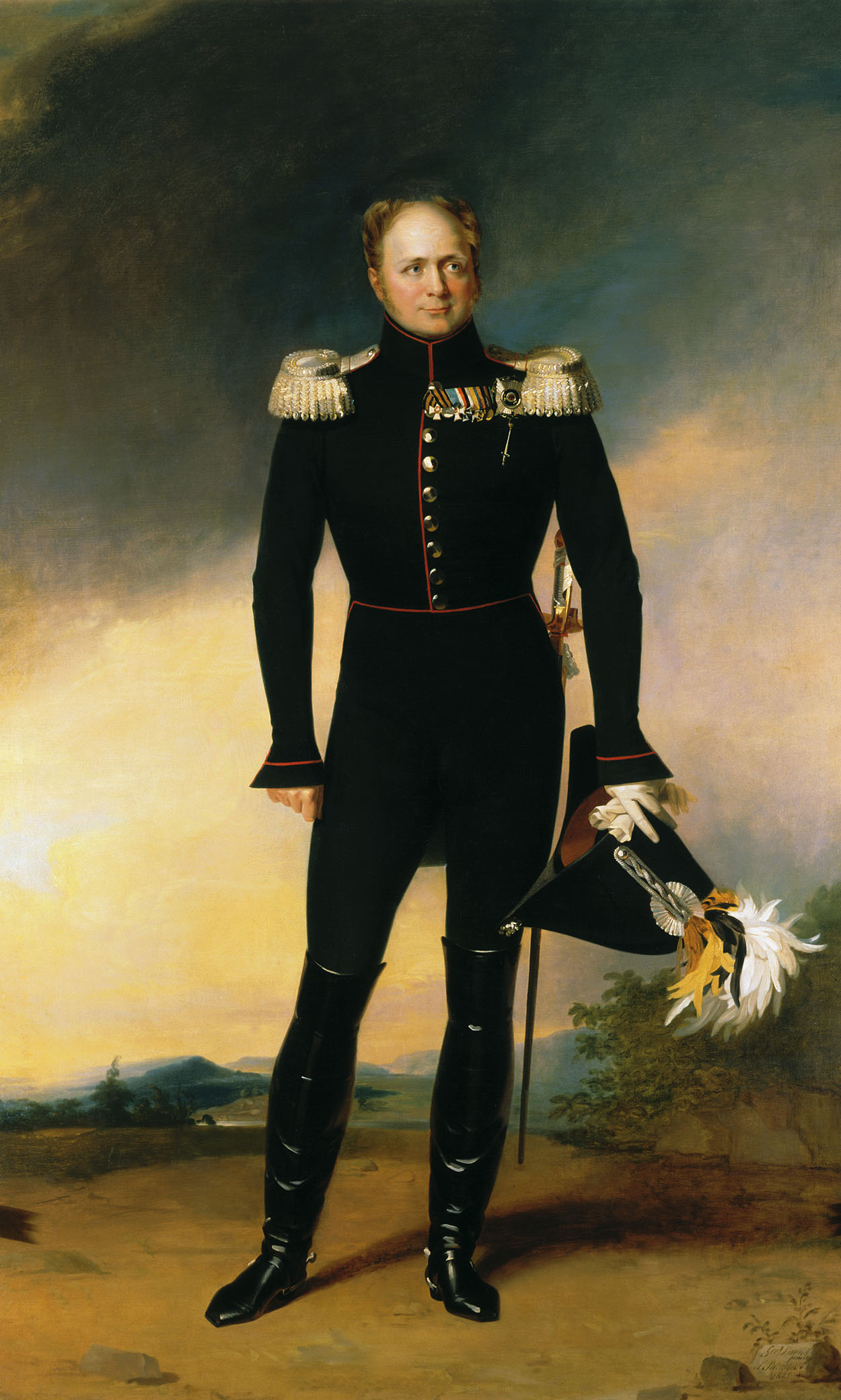
Alexander I of Russia considered himself a guarantor of European security.

The Congress's principal results, apart from its confirmation of France's loss of the territories annexed between 1795 and 1810, which had already been settled by the Treaty of Paris, were the enlargement of Russia (which gained most of the Duchy of Warsaw) and Prussia, which acquired the district of Poznań, Swedish Pomerania, Westphalia, and the northern Rhineland. The consolidation of Germany from the nearly 300 states of the Holy Roman Empire (dissolved in 1806) into a much less complex system of thirty-nine states (four of which were free cities) was confirmed. These states formed a loose German Confederation under the leadership of Austria.

Representatives at the Congress agreed to numerous other territorial changes. By the Treaty of Kiel, Norway had been ceded by the king of Denmark-Norway to the king of Sweden. This sparked the nationalist movement which led to the establishment of the Kingdom of Norway on 17 May 1814 and the subsequent personal Union with Sweden. Austria gained Lombardy–Venetia in Northern Italy, while much of the rest of North-Central Italy went to Habsburg dynasties (the Grand Duchy of Tuscany, the Duchy of Modena, and the Duchy of Parma).

The Papal States were restored to the Pope. The Kingdom of Piedmont-Sardinia was restored to its mainland possessions, and also gained control of the Republic of Genoa. In southern Italy, Napoleon's brother-in-law, Joachim Murat, was originally allowed to retain his Kingdom of Naples, but his support of Napoleon in the Hundred Days led to the restoration of the Bourbon Ferdinand IV to the throne.

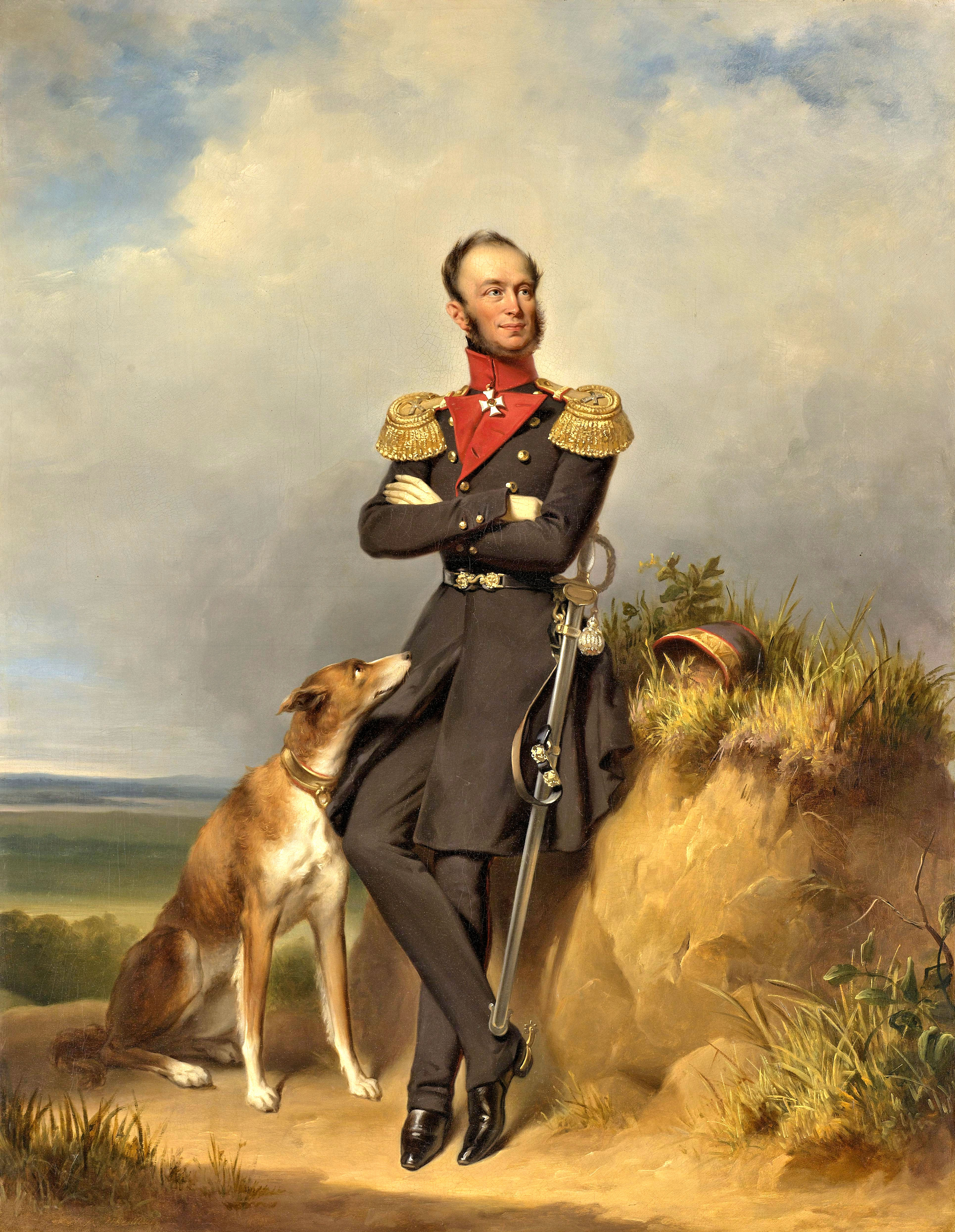
William II, King of the Netherlands. Painting by Jan Adam Kruseman, 1840

A large United Kingdom of the Netherlands was formed for the Prince of Orange, including both the old United Provinces and the formerly Austrian-ruled territories in the Southern Netherlands, which gave way to the formation of a democratic state, formally headed by a constitutional monarch. Other, less important, territorial adjustments included significant territorial gains for the German Kingdoms of Hanover (which gained East Frisia from Prussia and various other territories in Northwest Germany) and Bavaria (which gained the Rhenish Palatinate and territories in Franconia). The Duchy of Lauenburg was transferred from Hanover to Denmark, and Prussia annexed Swedish Pomerania. Switzerland was enlarged, and Swiss neutrality was established. Swiss mercenaries had played a significant role in European wars for several hundred years: the Congress intended to put a stop to these activities permanently.

During the wars, Portugal had lost its town of Olivenza to Spain and moved to have it restored. Portugal was historically Britain's oldest ally, and with British support succeeded in having the re-incorporation of Olivenza decreed in Article CV of the General Treaty of the Final Act, which stated that "The Powers, recognizing the justice of the claims of ... Portugal and the Brazils, upon the town of Olivenza, and the other territories ceded to Spain by the Treaty of Badajoz of 1801". Portugal ratified the Final Act in 1815 but Spain would not sign, and this became the most important hold-out against the Congress of Vienna. Deciding in the end that it was better to become part of Europe than to stand alone, Spain finally accepted the Treaty on 7 May 1817; however, Olivenza and its surroundings were never returned to Portuguese control and, to the present day, this issue remains unresolved.

The United Kingdom received parts of the West Indies at the expense of the Netherlands and Spain and kept the former Dutch colonies of Ceylon and the Cape Colony as well as Malta and Heligoland. Under the Treaty of Paris (1814) Article VIII France ceded to Britain the islands of "Tobago and Saint Lucia, and of the Isle of France and its dependencies, especially Rodrigues and Les Seychelles", and under the Treaty between Great Britain and Austria, Prussia and Russia, respecting the Ionian Islands (signed in Paris on 5 November 1815), as one of the treaties signed during the Peace of Paris (1815), Britain obtained a protectorate over the United States of the Ionian Islands.

== Later criticism and praise ==
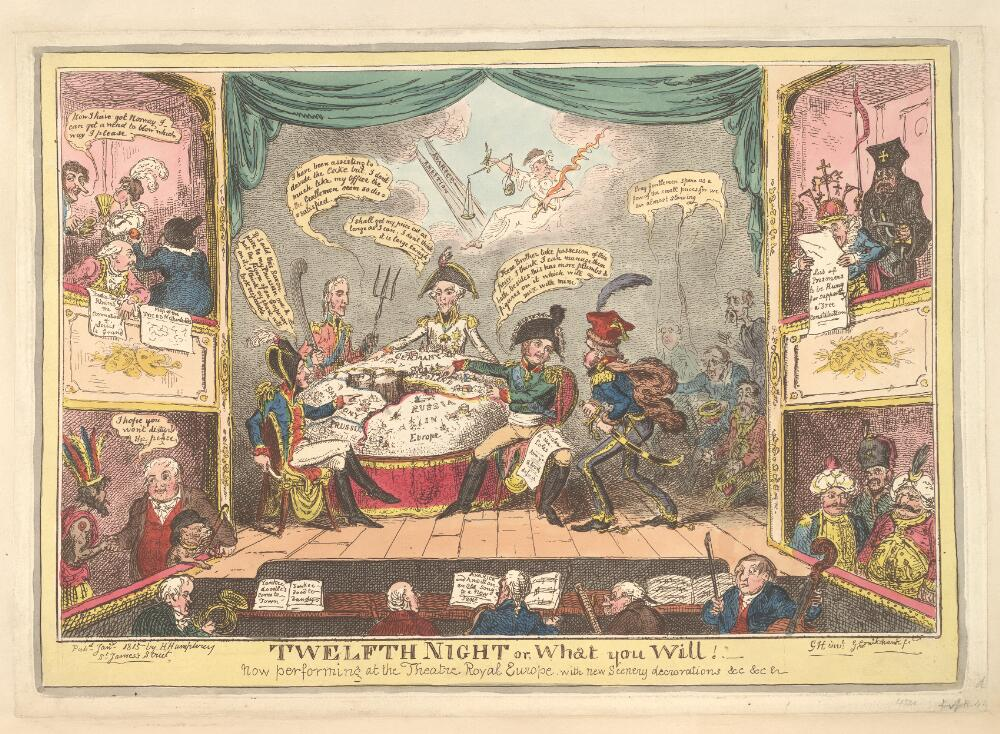
Twelfth Night by George Cruikshank, a contemporary caricature of the leading figures at the congress

The Congress of Vienna has been criticized by 19th-century and more recent historians and politicians for ignoring national and liberal impulses, and for imposing a stifling reaction on the Continent. It was an integral part in what became known as the Conservative Order, in which democracy and civil rights associated with the American and French Revolutions were de-emphasized.

In the 20th century, however, historians and politicians looking backward came to praise the Congress as well, because they saw it did prevent another widespread European war for nearly 100 years (1815–1914) and a significant step in the transition to a new international order in which peace was largely maintained through diplomatic dialogue. Among these is Henry Kissinger, whose 1954 doctoral dissertation, A World Restored, is a study of the Congress. Historian and jurist Mark Jarrett argues that the diplomatic congress format marked "the true beginning of our modern era". To his analyses the Congress organisation was deliberate conflict management and was the first genuine attempt to create an international order based upon consensus rather than conflict. "Europe was ready," Jarrett states, "to accept an unprecedented degree of international cooperation in response to the French Revolution." Historian Paul Schroeder argues that the old formulae for "balance of power" were in fact highly destabilizing and predatory, and that the Congress of Vienna instead set up rules that produced a stable and benign equilibrium. The Congress of Vienna was the first of a series of international meetings that came to be known as the Concert of Europe, which was an attempt to forge a peaceful balance of power in Europe. It served as a model for later organizations such as the League of Nations in 1919 and the United Nations in 1945.

Before the opening of the Paris peace conference of 1918, the British Foreign Office commissioned a history of the Congress of Vienna to serve as an example to its own delegates of how to achieve an equally successful peace. Besides, the main decisions of the Congress were made by the Four Great Powers and not all the countries of Europe could extend their rights at the Congress. The Italian peninsula became a mere "geographical expression" as divided into seven parts: Lombardy–Venetia, Modena, Naples–Sicily, Parma, Piedmont–Sardinia, Tuscany, and the Papal States under the control of different powers. Poland remained partitioned between Russia, Prussia and Austria, with the largest part, the newly created Kingdom of Poland, remaining under Russian control.

The arrangements made by the Four Great Powers sought to ensure future disputes would be settled in a manner that would avoid the terrible wars of the previous 20 years. Although the Congress of Vienna preserved the balance of power in Europe, it could not check the spread of revolutionary movements across the continent some 30 years later.

Some authors have suggested that the Congress of Vienna may provide a model for settling multiple interlocking conflicts in Eastern Europe that arose after the break-up of the Soviet Union.

== See also ==
- Diplomatic timeline for 1815
- Precedence among European monarchies
- Concert of Europe
- European balance of power
- Battle of Waterloo
- International relations (1814–1919)
- Treaty of Paris (1814)
- Paris Peace Conference (1919–1920)
- Ghent government in exile
- Treaty of Florence (1844)
