= A World Restored =

Book by Henry Kissinger

A World Restored: Metternich, Castlereagh and the Problems of Peace 1812–1822
- Author: Henry Kissinger
- Subject: Congress of Vienna
- Publisher: Houghton Mifflin
- Publication date: 1957
- Media type: Print (hardcover and paperback)
- Pages: 354 (first edition)

A World Restored: Metternich, Castlereagh and the Problems of Peace 1812–1822 is a book by political scientist and future diplomat Henry Kissinger. Published in 1957, it was written in 1954 as Kissinger's doctoral dissertation at Harvard University.

== Summary ==
The complex chain of Congresses is explained, which started after the end of the Napoleonic Wars in 1815, with the Congress of Vienna, and extended into the 1820s. The system was expected to give Europe peace and a new order after the violent struggles of the previous quarter-century.

The book also introduces the reader to the political biographies of two important characters of the time. The main character is Austrian Chancellor Klemens von Metternich. As the statesman of an old and fragile multilingual empire, Metternich had to deal with the task of organizing the alliance against Napoleon while he was forced to be ally of France. After Napoleon was defeated, Metternich became the organizer of the Congress system through which he sought the survival and advancement of the Austrian Empire.

An 18th-century rococo figure who was old-fashioned even in his own era but was described as having superlative diplomatic skills, Metternich pursued a peace for Europe based on restored monarchical principle and on solidarity among the monarchs of Europe. The 1789 French Revolution and the subsequent Napoleonic invasion and rule of much of Europe had implanted new liberal revolutionary ideas that were never to be eliminated.

Meanwhile, nationalism was rising over much of the world. The Austrian Empire was a complex political entity, with many ethnic groups and languages co-existing, which threatened its survival. Metternich expected to lead an alliance against France and to press only enough to depose Napoleon, who had shown a complete unwillingness to accept a moderate peace, but to preserve a strong France under a restored Bourbon monarchy as a counterweight to the power of Russia.

From 1812 onward, moderation was Metternich's guiding principle in the path to European order as he carried Austria from the forced alliance with France during Napoleon's invasion of Russia in which an Austrian corps, under Karl Philipp, Prince of Schwarzenberg, took part, to neutrality during the spring 1813 campaign and then as a leading member of the anti-French alliance that defeated France in 1813 and 1814. In the process, Metternich avoided breaking any of his treaties with his counterparts, as he knew that only established order among states would permit fragile Austria to survive.

Metternich was very skillful and so gained the confidence of all rulers at the many European congresses that followed. In his view, solidarity among monarchs would restrain the danger of liberal revolutions and diverse national upheavals around Europe.

The other great character is British Foreign Secretary Viscount Castlereagh. As the only British politician to understand Metternich's ambitions and reasoning and the need for an organized European order, he was strongly criticised in Britain for getting too involved in Continental Europe's politics in the name of British interests. After the Congress of Vienna, he was forbidden to attend any more European Congresses. He later committed suicide for unrelated reasons in 1822.

From then on, Britain started its long period of splendid isolation, which was based on its supposed insular invulnerability and its belief that the peace was a simple consequence of Napoleon's defeat. For Austria, a continental power, the reality was different. Another Napoleon could emerge at any time, and a strong European concert of conservative monarchs, based on principle, was necessary to prevent dangers before they arose.

Although the Congress system worked for only a few years, the concept and principles on which it was based allowed the longest period of peace among states in history with only a few minor interruptions. It was such a long peace that the faith in it and the forgotten consequences of war ended in an arms race, which was followed by a new much larger catastrophe in 1914.

== Sources ==
- A World Restored, Metternich, Castlereagh and the conservative politics in a revolutionary world. Henry Kissinger, 1973, Spanish Edition.
