= Friedrich von Gentz =

German diplomat and writer (1764–1832)

Freiherr Friedrich von Gentz
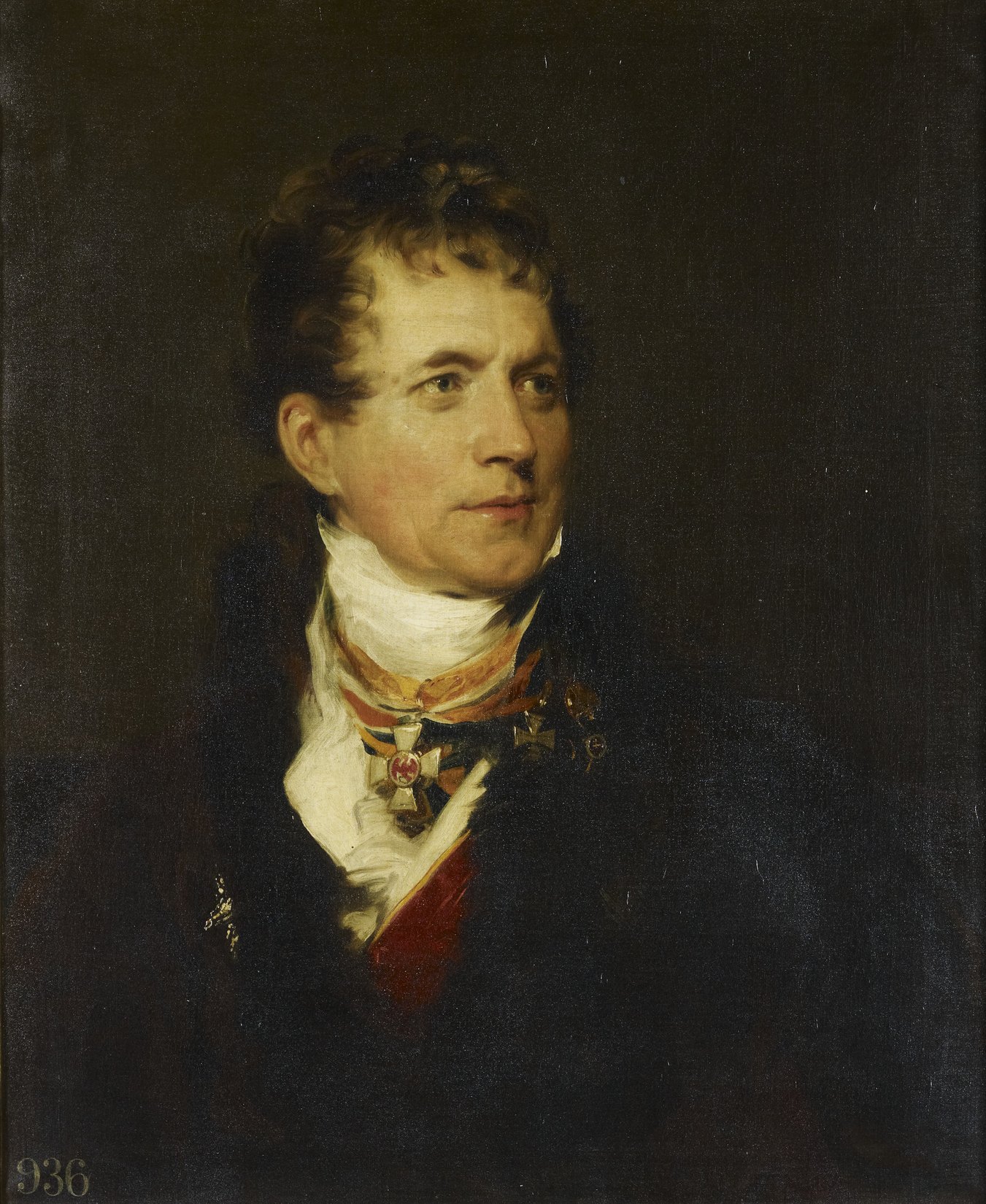
- Portrait by Thomas Lawrence, c. 1818–1819
- Born: 2 May 1764; Breslau, Kingdom of Prussia
- Died: 9 June 1832 (aged 68); Vienna, Austrian Empire
- Resting place: Gräberhain Währinger Park
- Education: University of Königsberg; Joachimsthal Gymnasium
- Occupations: Publicist; diplomat
- Known for: Éminence grise to Metternich
- Spouse: Maria Gilly (m. 1793; sep. 1802)
- Relatives: Heinrich Gentz (brother); David Gilly (father-in-law)
- Writing career
- Years active: 1791–1806
- Genres: Political journalism; diary; translation
- Subjects: Freedom of the press; French Revolution; Conservatism; Balance of power
- Notable work: See: § Works of von Gentz

Philosophical work
- Era: Age of Enlightenment; Romanticism
- Region: Western philosophy; German philosophy
- School: Conservatism; Constitutionalism; Kantianism
- Main interests: Political philosophy; Balance of power; Freedom of the press

Friedrich von Gentz (2 May 1764 – 9 June 1832) was a Prussian-Austrian diplomat and a writer. With Austrian chancellor Klemens von Metternich he was one of the main forces behind the organisation, management and protocol of the Congress of Vienna.

== Early life ==
Von Gentz was born in Breslau. His father was an official, his mother was from the distinguished Berlin Huguenot family Ancillon and the aunt of Prussian minister Friedrich Ancillon. On his father′s transfer from Breslau to Berlin as director general of the royal mint, the gifted boy was sent to the Joachimsthalsches Gymnasium there. At the University of Königsberg he got acquainted with the teachings and thinking of Immanuel Kant, his intellect was sharpened and his zeal for learning quickened by the great thinker's influence. Nevertheless Kant′s categorical imperative and his ideas on the commandment of reason, from which all duties and obligations derive, did not prevent von Gentz from yielding to the taste for wine, women and gambling.

When in 1785 he returned to Berlin, he received the appointment of secretary to the royal Generaldirectorium, his brilliant talents soon gaining him promotion to the rank of councillor for war (Kriegsrath). During an illness, which kept him virtuous by confining him to his room, he studied French and English, gaining a mastery of these languages, which opened up for him opportunities for a diplomatic career.

== French Revolution ==
His interest in public affairs was, however, first aroused by the outbreak of the French Revolution. As a quick-witted young man, he greeted it with enthusiasm, but its subsequent developments cooled his ardour and he was converted to more conservative views by Burke's Reflections on the Revolution in France, the translation of which into German (1794) was his first literary venture. This was followed, the next year, by translations of works on the Revolution by Mallet du Pan and Mounier, and he also founded and edited a monthly journal, the Neue deutsche Monatsschrift in which, for five years he wrote, mainly on historical and political questions. He maintained the principles of British constitutionalism against those of revolutionary France. The knowledge that he displayed of the principles and practice of finance was especially remarkable. In 1797, at the instance of English statesmen, he published a translation of a history of French finance by François Divernois (1757–1842), an eminent Genevese exile naturalized and knighted in England, extracts from which he had previously given in his journal. His literary output, all inspired by a moderate liberalism, was astounding, and it included an essay on the results of the discovery of the Americas, and another, written in French, on the English financial system (Essai sur l'état de l'administration des finances de la Grande-Bretagne, London, 1800). Especially noteworthy, however, was the Denkschrift or Memorandum he addressed to King Frederick William III on his accession (1797), in which, inter alia, he urged upon the king the necessity for granting freedom to the press and to commerce. For a Prussian official to venture to give uncalled-for advice to his sovereign was a breach of propriety not calculated to increase his chances of favour, but it gave von Gentz a conspicuous position in the public eye, which his brilliant talents and literary style enabled him to maintain. Moreover, he was from the first aware of the probable developments of the Revolution and of the consequences to Prussia of the weakness and vacillations of her policy.

Opposition to France was the inspiring principle of the Historisches Journal founded by him in 1799 and 1800, which once more held up English institutions as the model, and he became in Germany the mouthpiece of British policy towards the revolutionary aggressions of the French Republic. In 1801, he ceased the publication of the Journal because he disliked the regularity of journalism. He issued instead, under the title Beiträge zur Geschichte, etc., a series of essays on contemporary politics. The first was Über den Ursprung und Charakter des Krieges gegen die französische Revolution (1801), regarded by many as Gentz's masterpiece; another important brochure, Von dem politischen Zustande von Europa vor und nach der Revolution, a criticism of Hauterive's De l'ėtat de la France de la fin de l'an VIII, appeared the same year.

== Imperial councillor, Vienna ==
He gained recognition abroad and gifts of money from the British and Austrian governments, but it made his position as an official in Berlin impossible, as the Prussian government had no mind to abandon its attitude of cautious neutrality. Private affairs also combined to urge von Gentz to leave the Prussian service; mainly through his own action, a separation with his wife was arranged. In May 1802, accordingly, he took leave of his wife and left with his friend Adam Müller for Vienna. In Berlin, he had been intimate with the Austrian ambassador, Count Stadion, whose good offices procured him an introduction to the Emperor Francis. The immediate result was the title of imperial councillor, with a yearly salary of 4000 gulden (6 December 1802), but it was not until 1809 that he was actively employed. Before returning to Berlin to make arrangements for transferring himself finally to Vienna, von Gentz paid a visit to London, where he made the acquaintance of Pitt and Grenville, who were so impressed with his talents that in addition to large money presents, he was guaranteed an annual pension by the British government in recognition of the value of the services of his pen against Napoleon Bonaparte.

From then on, he was engaged in a ceaseless polemic against every fresh advance of Napoleonic dictatorial power and pretensions. With matchless sarcasm he lashed the nerveless policy of courts that suffered indignity with resignation. He denounced the recognition of Napoleon's imperial title and drew up a manifesto of Louis XVIII against it. The formation of the coalition and the outbreak of war, for a while, raised his hopes despite his lively distrust of the competence of Austrian ministers. Hopes were speedily dashed by the Battle of Austerlitz and its results. Von Gentz used his enforced leisure to write a brilliant essay on The relations between England and Spain before the outbreak of war between the two powers (Leipzig, 1806). Shortly afterwards appeared Fragmente aus der neuesten Geschichte des politischen Gleichgewichts in Europa (translated as Fragments on the Balance of Power in Europe, London, 1806). The last of von Gentz's works as an independent publicist, it was a masterly exposé of the actual political situation and was also prophetic in its suggestions as to how this should be retrieved: ″Through Germany Europe has perished; through Germany it must rise again″.

He realized that the dominance of France could not be broken but by the union of Austria and Prussia, acting in concert with Britain. He watched with interest the Prussian military preparations. At the invitation of Count Haugwitz, he went at the outset of the campaign to the Prussian headquarters at Erfurt, where he drafted the king's proclamation and his letter to Napoleon. The writer was known, and it was in this connection that Napoleon referred to him as a ″wretched scribe named Gentz, one of those men without honour who sell themselves for money″. Von Gentz had no official mandate from the Austrian government, and whatever hopes he may have cherished of privately influencing the situation in the direction of an alliance between the two German powers were speedily dashed by the Battle of Jena.

The downfall of Prussia left Austria the sole hope of Germany and of Europe. Von Gentz, who from the winter of 1806 onwards divided his time between Prague and the Bohemian watering places, seemed to devote himself wholly to the pleasures of society, his fascinating personality gaining him a ready reception in those exalted circles that were to prove of use to him later on in Vienna. However, though he published nothing, his pen was not idle, and he was occupied with a series of essays on the future of Austria and the best means of liberating Germany and redressing the balance of Europe, but he himself confessed to his friend Müller (4 August 1806) that in the miserable circumstances of the time, his essay on the principles of a general pacification must be taken as a political poem.

== Assisting von Metternich ==
In 1809, on the outbreak of war between Austria and France, von Gentz was for the first time actively employed by the Austrian government under Stadion. He drafted the proclamation announcing the declaration of war (15 April) and during the continuance of hostilities his pen was ceaselessly employed. The peace of 1810 and the fall of Stadion once more dashed his hopes and, disillusioned and hellishly blasé, he once more retired to comparative inactivity at Prague. Of von Metternich, Stadion's successor, he had at the outset no high opinion, and it was not until 1812 that the two men had close relations that were to ripen into lifelong friendship. However, when von Gentz returned to Vienna as von Metternich′s adviser, he was no longer the fiery patriot who had sympathized and corresponded with Stein in the darkest days of German depression and, in fiery periods, called upon all Europe to free itself from foreign rule. Disillusioned and cynical but clear-sighted as ever, he was henceforth before all things an Austrian, more Austrian, on occasion even than von Metternich.

During the final stages of the campaign of 1814, he expressed the hope that von Metternich would substitute Austria for Europe in his diplomacy and, despite his opposition to Napoleon and of France, secure an Austro-French alliance by maintaining the husband of Marie Louise on the throne of France.

== Diplomatic work, Congress of Vienna ==
For ten years, from 1812 onward, von Gentz was in close touch with all the great affairs of European history as a writer and diplomat. He was the right hand, confidant and adviser of von Metternich. He accompanied the chancellor on his journeys and was present at all the conferences that preceded and followed the war. No political secrets were hidden from him, and his hand drafted all important diplomatic documents. He was secretary to the Congress of Vienna (1814–1815) a series of meetings to design a longterm peace plan for Europe, which meant he was state of affairs manager and head of protocol. His vast knowledge of men and affairs made him a power. He was under no illusion as to their achievements, and his memoir on the work of the Congress of Vienna is at once an incisive piece of criticism and a monument of his own disillusionment. He notes that at the Congress he received £22,000 through Talleyrand from Louis XVIII, while Castlereagh gave him £600, accompanied by ″les plus folles promesses″; his diary is full of such entries. Yet he never made any secret of these gifts. Von Gentz did attend all the congresses and conferences that followed until the Congress of Verona (1822).

However, the liberalism of his early years was gone, and he had become reconciled to von Metternich's view that in an age of decay, the sole function of a statesman was to prop up mouldering institutions. It was the hand of the author of that offensive Memorandum to Frederick William III of Prussia on the freedom of the press that drafted the Carlsbad Decrees. It was he who inspired the policy of repressing the freedom of the universities, and he noted in his diary as a day more important than that of Leipzig the session of the Vienna conference of 1819, which decided to make the convocation of representative assemblies in the German states impossible, by enforcing the letter of Article XIII of the Act of Confederation.

== Private life ==
In private life, von Gentz remained to the last a man of the world, but he was tormented with an exaggerated terror of death. He never saw his wife again since their parting at Berlin – she died in December 1802, a few months after his departure. His relations with other women, mostly of the highest rank, were too numerous to record. However, passion tormented him to the end, and his infatuation for Fanny Elssler, the celebrated danseuse, forms the subject of some remarkable letters to his friend Rahel, the wife of Varnhagen von Ense (1830–1831).

Von Gentz remained a Protestant and never converted to Catholicism, although this step would have made his political and social life in the Austrian Empire easier.

== Death and legacy ==
Von Gentz died in Vienna on 19 June 1832. He has been described as a mercenary of the pen, and no other such mercenary has ever carved out for himself a more remarkable career. To have done so would have been impossible, in spite of his brilliant gifts, had he been no more than the ″wretched scribe″ sneered at by Napoleon. Though by birth he belonged to the middle class in a country of hide-bound aristocracy, he lived to move on equal terms in the society of princes and statesmen, which would never have been the case had he been notoriously bought and sold. Yet that he was in the habit of receiving gifts from all and sundry who hoped for his backing is beyond dispute. Von Metternich was aware of them, and he never suspected von Gentz of writing or acting in consequence against his convictions. As a matter of fact, no man was more free or outspoken in his criticism of the policy of his employers than this apparently venal writer. The gifts and pensions were rather in the nature of subsidies than bribes. They were the recognition by various powers of the value of an ally whose pen had proved itself so potent a weapon in their cause.

It is, indeed, his objectivity that make writings of von Gentz such important documents for the period of history which they cover. Allowance must of course be made for his point of view but less so perhaps than in the case of any other writer so closely concerned with the policies which he criticizes. Apart from their value as historical documents, von Gentz′s writings are literary monuments, classic examples of German language prose and of French as a model for diplomatic style.

== Works (translations) ==
- The Origin and Principles of the American Revolution, Compared with the Origin and Principles of the French Revolution at Google Books, Asbury Dickins, 1800 (translated by John Quincy Adams).
- A Vindication of Europe and Great Britain from Misrepresentation and Aspersion, John Stockdale, 1803.
- On the State of Europe Before and After the French Revolution, J. Hatchard, 1804.
- Fragments Upon the Balance of Power in Europe, M. Peltier, 1806.
