= Joaquim Lobo da Silveira, 7th Count of Oriola =

Portuguese plenipotentiary at the Congress of Vienna

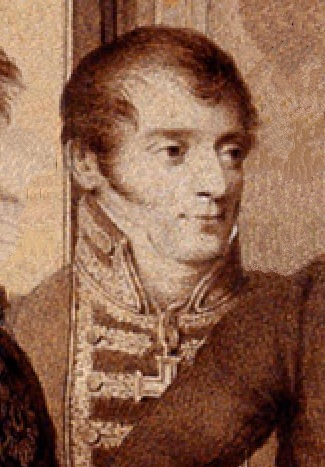
The Count of Oriola

Joaquim Lobo da Silveira, 7th Count of Oriola (May 12, 1772 – April 27, 1846) was a Portuguese plenipotentiary at the Congress of Vienna in 1815. While at the Congress he signed a number of treaties and documents on behalf of Prince-Regent John of Portugal including the Declaration of the Powers, on the Abolition of the Slave Trade, on 8 February 1815.

Later he acquired land in Prussia and settled there becoming a naturalised citizen of Prussia. The King of Prussia granted him the title of graf (the German equivalent to his Portuguese title of conde (count)).
