= Treaty of Chaumont =

1814 peace treaty

The Treaty of Chaumont was a series of separately-signed but identically-worded agreements in 1814 between the Austrian Empire, the Kingdom of Prussia, the Russian Empire and the United Kingdom. They were dated 1 March 1814, although the actual signings took place on 9 March. The treaty was intended to draw the powers of the Sixth Coalition into a closer alliance in case France rejected the peace terms they had recently offered. Each power agreed to put 150,000 soldiers in the field and to guarantee European peace, once the war had finished, against French aggression for twenty years.

== Background ==
In early February 1814, the allies opened the Congress of Châtillon-sur-Seine and demanded the French retreat to their pre-revolutionary borders. This was rejected by French general and diplomat Armand Caulaincourt, who, in later negotiations, demanded the Rhine and Alps be the boundaries of France's borders.

== Treaty ==
Representatives of Austria, Prussia, Russia, and the United Kingdom reconvened at a meeting at Chaumont, Haute-Marne, on 1 March 1814. The resulting treaty was signed on 9 March 1814 (although it was dated 1 March) by Emperor Alexander I of Russia, Austrian Emperor Francis II (with Prince Metternich), King Frederick William III of Prussia, and British Foreign Secretary Lord Castlereagh.

The treaty again called for Napoleon to give up all conquests and thus to revert France to its pre-revolutionary borders in exchange for a ceasefire. It also included territorial terms, such as; the establishment of a German confederation, the splitting of Italy into independent states, the return to power in Spain of the House of Bourbon, the independence of Switzerland, and the enlargement of the Netherlands to include what would become Belgium. The treaty also stated that the alliance of the allies should continue for twenty years after the conclusion of the war in order to deter French attempts at reprisals. This was achieved by each party contributing 150,000 troops to the region, with subsidies for another year of campaigning provided by Castlereagh. The treaty then determined that all final terms should be decided by the allies at a later conference.

If Napoleon rejected the treaty, the allies pledged to continue the war. If Napoleon accepted, he would be allowed to continue to rule as the Emperor of the French and to keep a dynasty. The following day, Napoleon rejected the treaty, which ended his last chance of a negotiated settlement.

== Aftermath ==
The decisions were again ratified and put into effect by the Treaty of Paris and, subsequently, the Congress of Vienna of 1814–1815.

== See also ==
- Eight Articles of London
- Holy Alliance
- Treaty of Fontainebleau (1814)
- Treaty of Paris (1814)
- Treaty of Paris (1815)
