= António de Saldanha da Gama, Count of Porto Santo =

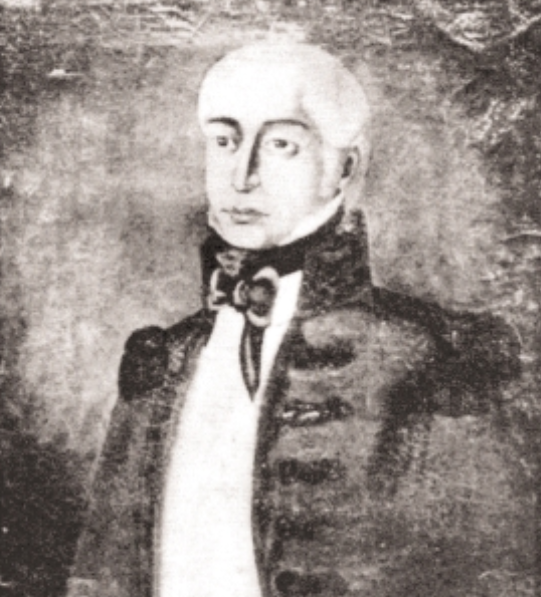
António de Saldanha da Gama, Count of Porto Santo

António de Saldanha da Gama, Count of Porto Santo (Lisbon, 5 February 1778 – 1839) was a Portuguese politician, navy officer, diplomat and colonial administrator. He was the Portuguese plenipotentiary at the Congress of Vienna in 1815. While at the Congress he signed a number of treaties and documents on behalf of Prince Regent John of Portugal including the Declaration of the Powers, on the Abolition of the Slave Trade, on 8 February 1815. He was governor of the Portuguese colony Maranhão (northern Brazil) between 1804 and 1806, and of Portuguese Angola between 1807 and 1810. He was created count of Porto Santo on 26 October 1823.
