= Peace with Honor =

Foreign policy slogan by Richard Nixon

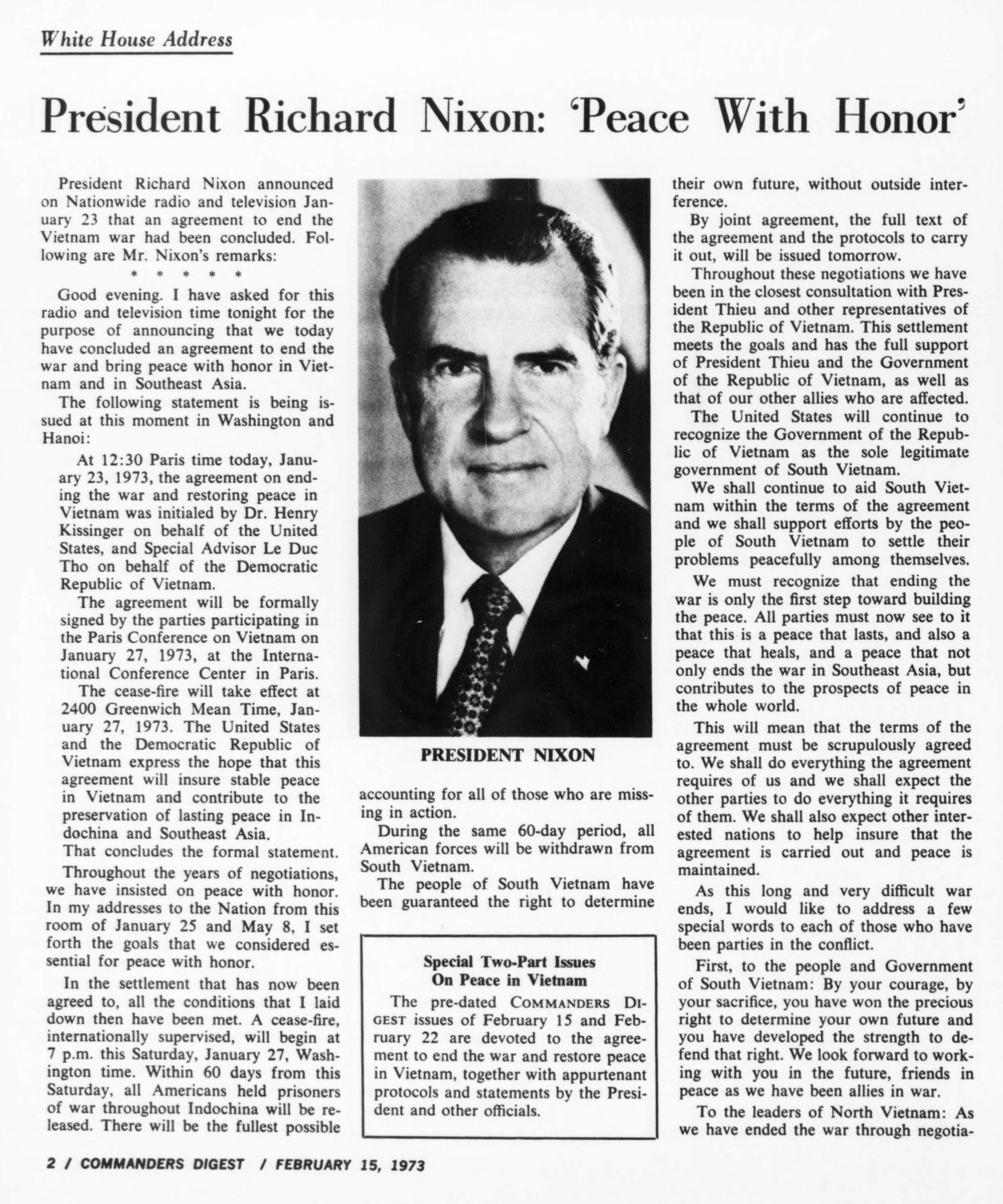
An article in Commander's Digest providing Nixon's January 1973 speech in which he used the slogan.

"Peace with Honor" was a foreign policy slogan used by U.S. President Richard Nixon. It originated from a campaign promise Nixon made in 1968: "I pledge to you that we shall have an honorable end to the war in Vietnam." The slogan became part of the Nixon Doctrine which included Peace Through Strength. Through these policies Nixon sought to end the war in Vietnam; the Peace with Honor slogan was specifically what he wanted to achieve, using the Nixon Doctrine and Peace Through Strength, Nixon said "peace through strength is the message I leave with you today... we seek peace with honor".

Nixon used it in a speech on January 23, 1973 to describe the Paris Peace Accords to end the Vietnam War. The Accords specified that a ceasefire would take place four days later. According to the plan, within sixty days of the ceasefire, the North Vietnamese would release all U.S. prisoners, and all U.S. troops would withdraw from South Vietnam. On March 29, 1973, the last U.S. soldier left Vietnam. On 30 April 1975, Saigon was taken by North Vietnamese troops.

Contemporary press reporting and some subsequent scholarship has claimed that Nixon said he had a "secret plan" to end the war. In fact, he did not use the phrase himself, but in remarks to reporters and Dwight D. Eisenhower, did allude to terms that he would offer North Vietnam that he was not willing to disclose before reaching office. Nixon did not explain how he would achieve peace, even to his closest confidants.

== Earlier uses ==
- 49 BC, Cicero: "Until we know whether we are to have peace without honour or war with its calamities, I have thought it best to for them to stay at my house in Formiae and the boys and girls too."
- c. 1145, Theobald II, Count of Champagne: "Peace with honor" written in a letter to King Louis VII of France.
- 1607, William Shakespeare: "That it shall hold companionship in peace/With honour, as in war."
- 1775, Edmund Burke: "The superior power may offer peace with honor and with safety… But the concessions of the weak are concessions of fear."
- 1878, Benjamin Disraeli: "Lord Salisbury and myself have brought you back peace—but a peace I hope with honour, which may satisfy our sovereign and tend to the welfare of our country." Said upon returning from the Congress of Berlin. Wags paraphrased this as "Peace with honour — and Cyprus too."
- 1916, Wilson Business Men's League: "Wilson and peace with honor or Hughes with Roosevelt and War?" Part of U.S. President Woodrow Wilson's reelection campaign.
- 1934, A. A. Milne: Peace with Honour: An Enquiry into the War Convention [book title]
- 1938, Neville Chamberlain: "My good friends, for the second time in our history, a British Prime Minister has returned from Germany bringing peace with honour. I believe it is 'peace for our time.' Go home and get a nice quiet sleep." Said upon returning from the Munich Conference.
- 1938, Winston Churchill criticizing Chamberlain's appeasement with Hitler, commented: "You were given the choice between war and dishonour. You chose dishonour, and you will have war."
- 1939, Józef Beck speaking in the Sejm (parliament) on the 5th of May 1939 in response to Hitler's demands for annexing the Free City of Danzig to Germany: "We in Poland do not know the meaning of a peace at every price. There is only one thing in the life of people, nations and states that is priceless. That thing is the honour."

== See also ==
- Decent interval
- Peace for our time
