= Vietnam stab-in-the-back myth =

Myth about United States' defeat in the Vietnam War

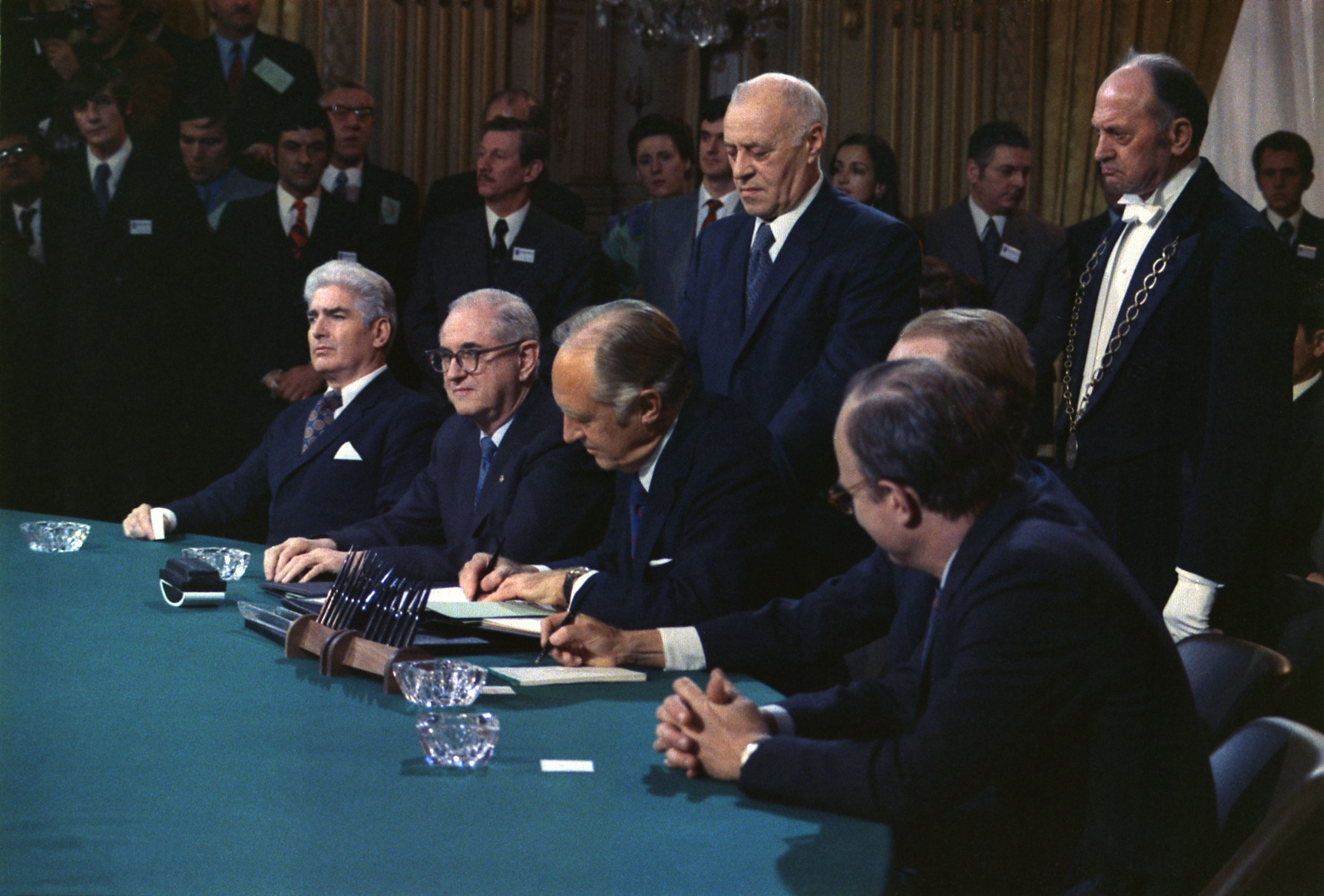
The signing of the Paris Peace Accords on January 27, 1973

The Vietnam stab-in-the-back myth asserts that the United States' defeat during the Vietnam War was caused by various American groups, such as civilian policymakers, the mass media, antiwar protesters, the United States Congress, or political liberals.

Used primarily by right-wing war hawks, the name "stab-in-the-back" is analogous to the German stab-in-the-back myth, which claims that internal forces caused the German defeat during World War I. However, the American claim usually lacks the antisemitic elements, implicit or express, of its German namesake. Jeffrey Kimball wrote that the United States' defeat "produced a powerful myth of betrayal that was analogous to the archetypal Dolchstoßlegende of post-World War I Germany."

The myth was a "stronger version of the argument that antiwar protest encouraged the enemy, suggested that the antiwar movement might in the end commit the ultimate act of treachery, causing the loss of an otherwise winnable war."

== Background ==
Similar accusations have been made throughout American history. During the War of 1812, the War Hawks accused supporters of the Federalist Party in New England of "near-treasonous activity" for the US failure to conquer Canada. Right-wing commentators also claimed that President Franklin D. Roosevelt had "sold out" Poland and the Republic of China with the Yalta Agreement and blamed President Harry S. Truman and Secretary of State Dean Acheson for American failures during the Korean War. Casualties mounted slowly during the Vietnam War after the 1965 deployment of combat troops and in 1968 surpassed those of the Korean War.

== Development ==
During the war, hearings were held in the United States Senate regarding the progress of the war. At hearings of the Senate Preparedness Investigating Subcommittee (SPIS), generals testified that the failure of the war in 1967 had been caused by excessive civilian restraint on target selection during the bombing of North Vietnam, and the subcommittee agreed. Joseph A. Fry contends that the Joint Chiefs of Staff and SPIS, by blaming the media and antiwar protesters for misrepresenting the war, cultivated the stab-in-the-back myth.

Although much of the American public had never supported the war, General William Westmoreland blamed the American media and anti-war protesters for turning the country against the war after the 1968 Tet Offensive. That narrative was followed by later writers such as Guenter Lewy, Norman Podhoretz, Ann Coulter, Aleksandr Solzhenitsyn, as well as scholars such as Richard Pipes, etc. One study estimated that until the offensive, American pundits had supported their government's war policy four to one but afterward switched to being two to one against it. Many history textbooks state that the offensive was followed by public opinion turning against the war, and some accounts mention media coverage. Another element of the myth relates to the 1973 Paris Peace Accords in which the stab-in-the-back interpretation holds that obstruction in the US Congress prevented the United States from enforcing the accords. According to Lien-Hang T. Nguyen, that interpretation of the accords has "more or less been rejected by most scholars in the field," but it remains alive in popular discourse.

In 1978 and 1979, Nixon and Kissinger respectively published best-selling memoirs that were based on access to still-classified documents, which suppressed the decent interval theory and "prop[ped] up the Dolchstoßlegende," according to the historian Ken Hughes.

In 1982, Harry G. Summers Jr. wrote that the idea that internal forces caused the defeat in Vietnam was "one of the more simplistic explanations for our failure... this evasion is rare among Army officers. A stab-in-the-back syndrome never developed after Vietnam." However, the historian Ben Buley has written that Summers' book is actually one of the most significant exponents of the myth, in a subtle form in which the military is criticized, but the primary responsibility for the defeat lies with civilian policymakers.

In his 1998 book, The Spitting Image: Myth, Memory, and the Legacy of Vietnam, Jerry Lembcke compared the stab-in-the-back myth with the myth that returning veterans were spat upon by and insulted by antiwar protesters (no spitting incident has ever been proven). According to Lembcke, the stab-in-the-back myth was more popular during the war, and the spitting myth gained prominence only in the 1980s. In his 2001 book The Culture of Defeat: On National Trauma, Mourning, and Recovery, Wolfgang Schivelbusch denied the existence of a Vietnam stab-in-the-back myth comparable to the German one. Although he wrote that some US rhetoric was "quite similar to that voiced by right-wing Germans during the Weimar Republic," he argued that the Vietnam War "did not entail national collapse... was not followed by a humiliation like that of the Versailles Treaty... [and] did not polarize the nation or lead to civil war." Professor Jeffrey Kimball responded that Schivelbusch "was incorrect on virtually every count." Kimball writes that the stab-in-the-back charge was resurrected in the 2004 United States presidential election in which the candidate John Kerry was criticized for opposing the war after his return from Vietnam.

In 2004, Charles Krauthammer wrote in The New Republic that the broadcaster Walter Cronkite had caused the US to be defeated: "Once said to be lost, it was." In 2017, David Mikics wrote that "the Vietnam stab-in-the-back argument is now largely dead."

== See also ==
- Stab-in-the-back myth
- McCarthyism
- Vietnam syndrome
- The Spitting Image
- Desmalvinización

== Sources ==
- Beattie, Keith (2000). "Stab Wounds". The Scar That Binds: American Culture and the Vietnam War. NYU Press. pp. 21–. ISBN 978-0-8147-8610-9.
- Haines, Harry (1989). "Disputing the Wreckage: Ideological Struggle at the Vietnam Veterans Museum". Vietnam Generation. 1 (1). Archived from the original on 2021-10-27.
- Young, Richard (2017). "The "Real Victims" of the Vietnam War: Soldier versus State in American Comic Books". The Journal of Popular Culture. 50 (3): 561–584. doi:10.1111/jpcu.12548.
