= Decent interval =

Theory regarding the end of the Vietnam War

Decent interval is a theory regarding the end of the Vietnam War which argues that from 1971 or 1972, the Nixon Administration abandoned the goal of preserving South Vietnam and instead aimed to save face by preserving a "decent interval" between withdrawal and South Vietnamese collapse. Therefore, President Richard Nixon could avoid becoming the first United States president to lose a war.

A variety of evidence from the Nixon tapes and from transcripts of meetings with foreign leaders is cited to support this theory, including Henry Kissinger's statement before the 1973 Paris Peace Accords that "our terms will eventually destroy him" (referring to South Vietnamese president Nguyễn Văn Thiệu). However, both Kissinger and Nixon denied that such a strategy existed.

== Background ==
Already by late 1970 or early 1971, Nixon and his National Security Advisor Kissinger "effectively abandoned the hope of a military victory" in the Vietnam War. Increasingly, they questioned the premise that the South Vietnamese Military would ever be able to defend its country without American help, especially after the Lam Son 719 debacle.

Following the Paris Peace Accords, the Nixon administration claimed that "peace with honor" had been achieved and that South Vietnamese independence had been guaranteed. After the Fall of Saigon, Nixon and Kissinger blamed the failure of the accords on the United States Congress refusing to continue support to South Vietnam—in other words, the Vietnam stab-in-the-back myth.

Publicly, Nixon stated that his goal from the peace accords was for North Vietnam to recognize South Vietnam's right to choose a leader by democratic election. The decent interval theory holds that, privately, the Nixon administration did not plan for the continuation of South Vietnam and was only interested in the release of United States prisoners of war and maintaining a "decent interval" before South Vietnamese collapse. If a "decent interval" elapsed between the withdrawal of American troops and the fall of the South Vietnamese government, Nixon could avoid the blame of being the first American president to lose a war.

The idea of a decent interval was absent from public debate during the Nixon years and originally advanced in a 1977 book of the same name by former CIA analyst Frank Snepp. However Snepp does not subscribe to the full theory of intentional abandonment of South Vietnam, but rather that Kissinger, U.S. Ambassador to Vietnam Graham Martin and others engaged in the same kinds of self-deluded thinking after the Paris accords that had gotten the US into Vietnam in the first place. What Snepp was most outraged over was the haste with which the Americans pulled out in April 1975, abandoning many key South Vietnamese allies and intelligence assets to their fates. Snepp was not party to the high-level negotiations in which the "decent interval" strategy occurred.

== Evidence ==
Historian Ken Hughes wrote, "The proof that Nixon and Kissinger timed military withdrawal to the 1972 election and negotiated a "decent interval" comes from extraordinarily rich and undeniable sources—the Nixon tapes and the near-verbatim transcripts that NSC aides made of negotiations with foreign leaders." This is despite "the normal human reluctance to produce self-incriminating evidence", which according to Hughes explains why more details about the strategy are not known.

The first sign of the strategy appears in the Nixon tapes on 18 February 1971, Kissinger stated that after a peace agreement was concluded, "What we can then tell the South Vietnamese—they've got a year without war to build up." According to Hughes, the statement indicates that Kissinger already realized that peace would not last. On 19 March, Kissinger stated that "We can't have it knocked over—brutally—to put it brutally—before the election", justifying timing the withdrawal of troops to the 1972 American presidential election. Nixon was also privately skeptical of the Vietnamization program, which he officially stated was "a plan in which we will withdraw all of our forces from Vietnam on a schedule in accordance with our program, as the South Vietnamese become strong enough to defend their own freedom". Hughes writes that Nixon's statements on Vietnamization are unambiguously false and the program to be a "fraud".

In his first secret meeting with Zhou Enlai in 1971, Kissinger explained that the United States wanted a full withdrawal, the return of all POWs, and a ceasefire for "18 months or some period." Kissinger noted that "If the government is as unpopular as you seem to think, then the quicker our forces are withdrawn, the quicker it will be overthrown. And if it is overthrown after we withdraw, we will not intervene." In later meetings, Kissinger used the words "reasonable interval", a "sufficient interval", and a "time interval" to refer to the time that would have to pass after United States withdrawal before the aggression against South Vietnam would not result in a forceful reaction from the United States.

Nixon and Kissinger tape of 3 August 1972, discussing the decent interval

Nixon's and Kissinger's conversation on 6 October 1972

In discussions with Chinese and Soviet leaders, Kissinger stated that the United States would not intervene if more than 18 months passed since a settlement. A crucial point in the negotiations occurred after the North conceded in its demand for South Vietnamese President Nguyễn Văn Thiệu's resignation; according to American intelligence, the South Vietnamese government would quickly unravel without him. On 3 August 1972, Nixon stated, "I think we could take, in my view, almost anything, frankly, that we can force on Thieu. South Vietnam probably can never even survive anyway." Kissinger replied: "We've got to find some formula that holds the thing together a year or two." Two days before the Paris Peace Accords were signed according to chief North Vietnamese negotiator Lê Đức Thọ's proposal (8 October 1972), Kissinger told Nixon twice that the terms would probably destroy South Vietnam: "I also think that Thieu is right, that our terms will eventually destroy him."

== Proponents ==
Historian Jeffrey Kimball supports the decent interval theory and promoted it in various books, including The Vietnam War Files (2004) and Nixon's Nuclear Specter (2015). Kimball argued that Nixon Administration adopted the decent interval strategy in the second half of Nixon's first term. According to Hughes, Kimball is "the leading scholar of the 'decent interval'".

In his book Henry Kissinger and the American Century, Jeremi Suri wrote: "By 1971 [Kissinger] and Nixon would accept a 'decent interval' between U.S. disengagement and a North Vietnamese takeover in the south. Secret talks with Hanoi would allow Kissinger to manage this process, preserving the image of American strength and credibility."

In a 2003 paper, Finnish historian Jussi Hanhimäki argued that

from the summer of 1971 to the conclusion of the Paris Agreements in January 1973 Kissinger tried to "sell" a peace agreement to his Soviet and Chinese interlocutors by stressing the American willingness to accept a "decent interval" solution: that is, the United States would not reenter the war provided that the collapse of the South Vietnamese government did not occur immediately after the last US ground troops returned home.

Hughes is very critical of the decent interval strategy:

[Nixon] forfeited America's geopolitical credibility abroad to maintain his political credibility at home. In their furtive negotiations for a "decent interval," Nixon and Kissinger revealed themselves to the Communists as craven and treacherous in their relationship with a supposed ally. They showed that they could accept the reality of defeat as long as they could avoid the appearance of it in the eyes of American voters... Nixon and Kissinger got the North to sign the Paris Accords in the first place by letting it know that it could conquer the South militarily as long as it waited an extra year or two.

According to Japanese historian Tega Yusuke, writing in 2012, decent interval "is becoming the standard explanation" because South Vietnam in fact collapsed in 1975 although Yusuke does not argue for it.

== Opponents ==
Kissinger and Nixon both denied that they had used a "decent interval" strategy. Kissinger wrote, "Nor is it correct that all we sought was a 'decent interval' before a final collapse of Saigon. All of us who negotiated the agreement of October 12 were convinced that we had vindicated the anguish of a decade not by a 'decent interval' but by a decent settlement." Both had a vested interest in keeping the "decent interval" secret. Based on newly declassified documents, in 2001 Larry Berman wrote a book, No Peace, No Honor in which he argued that Nixon actually planned for a permanent war in Vietnam, rather than a decent interval before defeat. Tega Yusuke writes that although Nixon recognised the possibility of South-Vietnamese collapse post-American withdrawal "he could not abandon the search for “peace with honor” in order to avoid the loss of US “credibility”." John M. Carland writes that the Decent Interval theory "remains an argument for which the evidence used by proponents fails to support their interpretive rhetoric" and that "without better evidence than the belief that Nixon and Kissinger were so cynical and devious that they must have developed and implemented it...the decent interval theory is difficult if not impossible to sustain." Carland goes on to state that there are no documents regarding planning for a Decent Interval that he or others could find and that interpretations for it rely on interpreting the theory into the words of the principals which he regards as inappropriate for historians.

== Mixed ==
Luke Nichter, a historian who studied the Nixon tapes, has argued that, before Nixon's visit to China in early 1972, the decent interval theory did not explain the fluctuating attitude of Nixon and Kissinger to the war, which had sharp ups and downs depending on casualty figures and news reports. Nichter writes, "at times they speak of desiring no interval at all other than the duration necessary to quickly withdraw troops and POWs". After the China visit, "the tenor and content of their discussions seems much closer to support for the idea of a decent interval theory". In his book The Nixon Tapes, Nichter and his coauthor write opposing "scholars [who] argue that Nixon and Kissinger's strategy in Vietnam was never more than securing a ‘decent interval'". However, Hughes considers this to be a misrepresentation because he does not know of any scholars who argue that decent interval characterized the administration's strategy throughout.

Johannes Kadura argues that Nixon and Kissinger "simultaneously maintained a Plan A of further supporting Saigon and a Plan B of shielding Washington should their maneuvers prove futile." According to Kadura, the "decent interval" concept has been "largely misrepresented", in that Nixon and Kissinger "sought to gain time, make the North turn inward, and create a perpetual equilibrium" rather than acquiescing in the collapse of South Vietnam.

== Sources ==
- Snepp, Frank (1978). Decent Interval: An Insider's Account of Saigon's Indecent End Told by the CIA's Chief Strategy Analyst in Vietnam. Vintage Books. ISBN 0-394-72691-X. Paperback ed.
- Kimball, Jeffrey P. (2004). The Vietnam War Files: Uncovering the Secret History of Nixon-era Strategy. University Press of Kansas. ISBN 978-0-7006-1283-3.
- Hanhimäki, Jussi (2003). "Selling the 'Decent interval': Kissinger, triangular diplomacy, and the end of the Vietnam war, 1971-73". Diplomacy & Statecraft. 14 (1): 159–194. doi:10.1080/09592290412331308771. S2CID 218523033.
- Hughes, Ken (2010). "Fatal Politics: Nixon's Political Timetable for Withdrawing from Vietnam". Diplomatic History. 34 (3): 497–506. doi:10.1111/j.1467-7709.2010.00864.x.
- Hughes, Ken (2015). Fatal Politics: The Nixon Tapes, the Vietnam War, and the Casualties of Reelection. University of Virginia Press. ISBN 978-0-8139-3803-5.
- Record, Jeffrey (2010). "Leaving Vietnam: Insights for Iraq?". Diplomatic History. 34 (3): 567–576. doi:10.1111/j.1467-7709.2010.00870.x.
- Kadura, Johannes (2016). The War After the War: The Struggle for Credibility During America's Exit From Vietnam. Cornell University Press. ISBN 978-0801453960.
