= Nichter =

Nichter is a German surname derived from the German nickname nüchter / nüchtern 'sober'.

- Luke Nichter, American professor of history
- Mimi Nichter, American anthropologist
