= Lift and strike =

Lift and strike may refer to:

- Lift and strike (Bosnian War), an American policy proposal during the Bosnian War
- Lift-and-strike welding
- A movement in the game of hurling
