= Vietnam syndrome =

Term in U.S. politics

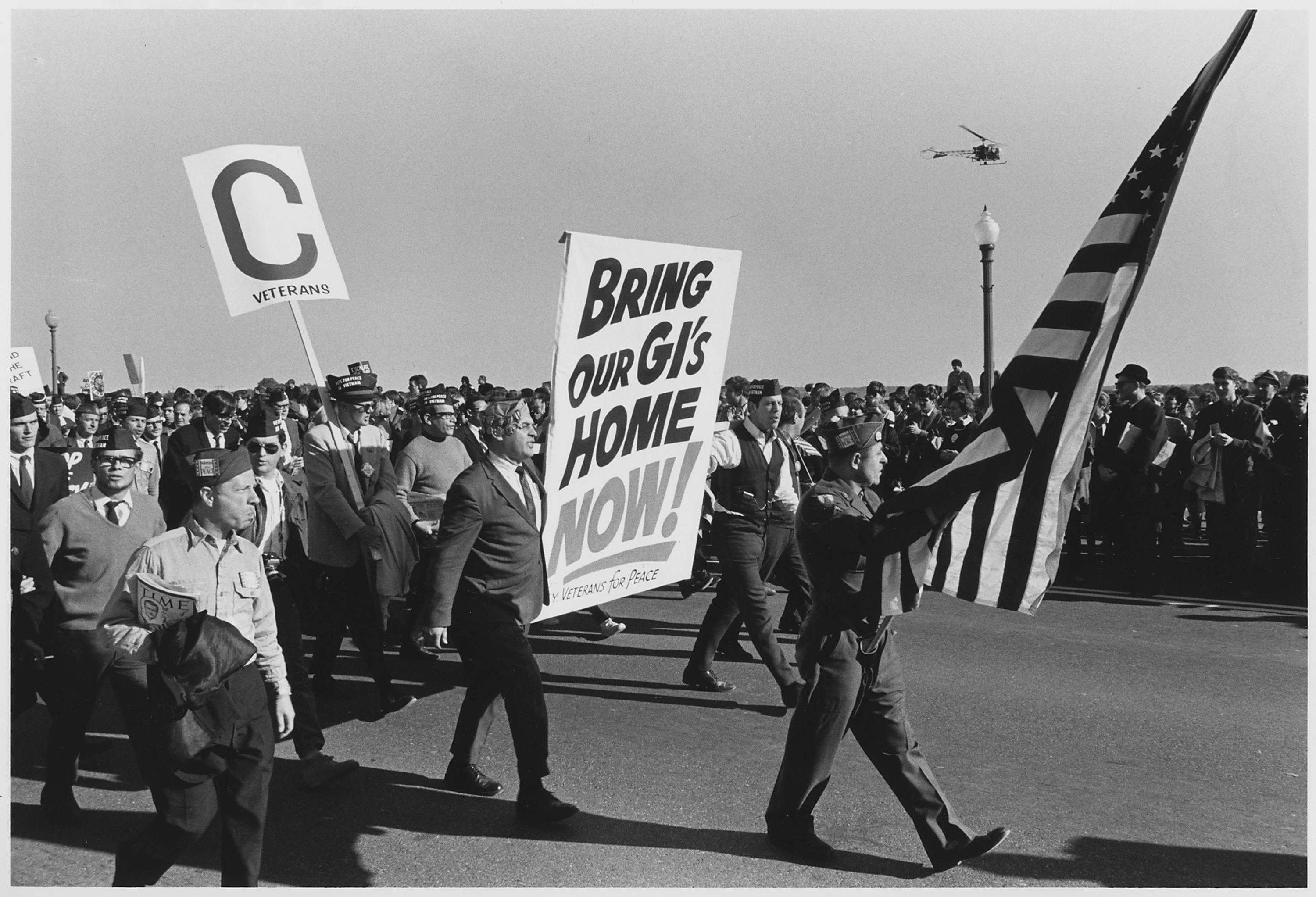
Vietnam veterans taking part in the 1967 March on the Pentagon.

Vietnam syndrome is a term in U.S. politics that refers to public reluctance to American military interventions overseas, following the controversy and failure of the Vietnam War. In 1973, the U.S. ended combat operations in Vietnam. Since the early 1980s, analysts and commentators have linked the Vietnam syndrome to shifts in public opinion against war, the end of active military conscription, a relative reluctance to deploy ground troops, and "Vietnam paralysis".

== Failure in Vietnam ==
In the domestic debate over the reasons for the US being unable to defeat communist forces during the war, conservative thinkers, many of whom were in the US military, argued that the US had sufficient resources but that the war effort had been undermined at home. In a 1976 article in Commentary, "Making the World Safe for Communism", the journalist Norman Podhoretz stated:

Do we lack power?... Certainly not if power is measured in brute terms of economic, technological, and military capacity. By those standards, we are still the most powerful country in the world.... The issue boils down in the end, then, to the question of will.

The term "Vietnam syndrome" thereafter proliferated in the press and policy circles as a way of explaining the United States, one of the world's superpowers, failing to repel North Vietnam's invasion of South Vietnam. Many hawkish conservatives such as Ronald Reagan agreed with Podhoretz. In time, the term "Vietnam syndrome" expanded as a shorthand for the idea that Americans were worried they would never win a war again and that their nation was in utter decline.

In the fall of 1983, President Reagan put his beliefs into action by ordering the invasion of Grenada. A long-simmering internal leadership dispute within the ruling Marxist-Leninist party on the Eastern Caribbean island had suddenly spun out of control, leading to political executions and innocent civilian deaths in the capital city on Oct. 19. Reagan concluded that swift American military action was necessary to protect about 1,000 American residents on the microstate, and also to restore Westminster-style democracy and end growing Soviet Bloc influence over the former British colony. Reagan pushed past the hesitancy of the Pentagon leadership, and the expected domestic and international blowback, to authorize a surprise U.S.-led intervention at dawn on Oct. 25. His presidential directive specifically instructed the Pentagon to take strict secrecy measures to head off any pre-emptive action by the Cubans or the Soviets. "Frankly, there was another reason I wanted secrecy", Reagan later confided in his autobiography. "It was what I call the 'post-Vietnam syndrome,' the resistance of so many in Congress to the use of military force abroad for any reason, because of our nation's experience in Vietnam.... I suspected that if we told the leaders of Congress about the operation, even under terms of the strictest confidentiality, there would be someone who would leak it to the press together with the prediction that Grenada was going to become 'another Vietnam.'.... We didn't ask anybody, we just did it."

== Ronald Reagan's speech to the Veterans of Foreign Wars ==
In the later 1970s and the 1980s, Ronald Reagan talked about the aspects of the Vietnam syndrome but argued that it could be overcome if Americans adopted a more confident and optimistic posture in the world, with him as leader. In the speech to the Veterans of Foreign Wars (VFW), which used the term "Vietnam syndrome", Reagan alleged that the time was right for such a change of attitude and action since the Soviet Union was outspending the US in the global arms race such that the latter's global power was decreasing. He accused the Carter administration of being "totally oblivious" to the Soviet threat.

Asserting a need for a more aggressive and activist foreign policy, Reagan also suggested that Americans could have defeated the Viet Cong and the North Vietnamese Army, alleged that the American public had turned against the war from the influence of North Vietnamese propaganda, and implied that officials had let down the soldiers and had been "afraid to let them win" the war.

Reagan equated the "Vietnam syndrome" with a reluctance on the part of the American public to support US military interventions but also with feelings of guilt about the devastation brought about because of the Vietnam War and with feelings of doubt over the morality of America's intentions and actions during the war. Reagan, however, argued that America had fought for "a noble cause" and blamed the war in Vietnam exclusively on North Vietnam's aggression:

For too long, we have lived with the "Vietnam Syndrome." Much of that syndrome has been created by the North Vietnamese aggressors who now threaten the peaceful people of Thailand. Over and over they told us for nearly 10 years that we were the aggressors bent on imperialistic conquests. They had a plan. It was to win in the field of propaganda here in America what they could not win on the field of battle in Vietnam. As the years dragged on, we were told that peace would come if we would simply stop interfering and go home.

It is time we recognized that ours was, in truth, a noble cause. A small country newly free from colonial rule sought our help in establishing self-rule and the means of self-defense against a totalitarian neighbor bent on conquest. We dishonor the memory of 50,000 young Americans who died in that cause when we give way to feelings of guilt as if we were doing something shameful, and we have been shabby in our treatment of those who returned. They fought as well and as bravely as any Americans have ever fought in any war. They deserve our gratitude, our respect, and our continuing concern.

There is a lesson for all of us in Vietnam. If we are forced to fight, we must have the means and the determination to prevail or we will not have what it takes to secure the peace. And while we are at it, let us tell those who fought in that war that we will never again ask young men to fight and possibly die in a war our government is afraid to let them win.

== Burial of syndrome by military actions ==
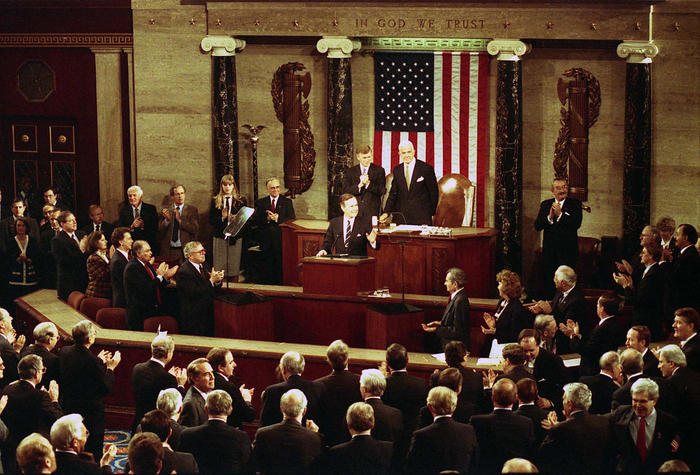
President George H. W. Bush addresses a joint session of Congress regarding the end of the war with Iraq.

The Reagan administration hoped that the success of the invasion of Grenada would help dispel the Vietnam syndrome so that the American public could be successfully galvanized to support new US military actions, with President Reagan declaring after the invasion, "Our days of weakness are over. Our military forces are back on their feet and standing tall."

The quick victory during the Gulf War was widely believed to be the end of the Vietnam syndrome. US President George H. W. Bush triumphantly declared after the war, "The ghosts of Vietnam have been laid to rest beneath the sands of the Arabian desert."

== Bosnian War ==
"Lift and strike" was a proposed policy by the Clinton administration in 1993, which Bill Clinton had supported during his successful presidential campaign in 1992. The policy sought to improve the chances of a political settlement in the Bosnian War in the former Yugoslavia by lifting the arms embargo, arming the Bosniaks (Bosnian Muslims), and striking at the Bosnian Serbs if they resisted the rearmament project. A combination of the Vietnam syndrome and very strong opposition from American allies in Europe killed the proposal, which was never enacted.

== See also ==
- Anti-communism
- Vietnam stab-in-the-back myth
- War-weariness
- Post-traumatic stress disorder
