= The Year That Broke Politics =

2023 book by Luke A. Nichter

The Year That Broke Politics: Collusion and Chaos in the Presidential Election of 1968
- Author: Luke A. Nichter
- Subject: American history
- Publisher: Yale University Press
- Publication date: 2023
- ISBN: 978-0-300-25439-6

The Year That Broke Politics: Collusion and Chaos in the Presidential Election of 1968 is a 2023 book written by Luke A. Nichter. The book talks about the 1968 United States presidential election.
