= Senate Preparedness Investigating Subcommittee =

The Senate Preparedness Investigating Subcommittee was a subcommittee of the United States Senate Committee on Armed Services.

It was created in 1950 during the Korean War and its inaugural chairman was future President Lyndon B Johnson. Johnson was aware of the previous work of the Truman Committee in raising the profile of Harry Truman and looked at the committee as a similar way to raise his profile.

It conducted investigations of defense costs and efficiency. These investigations demanded actions that were already being taken in part by the Truman administration, although it reinforced the need for changes. Johnson gained national attention through his handling of media. Johnson ensured that every report was endorsed unanimously by his committee. He used his political influence in the Senate to receive broadcast licenses from the Federal Communications Commission in his wife's name. After the 1950 general elections, Johnson was chosen as Senate Majority Whip in 1951 under the new majority leader, Ernest McFarland of Arizona, and served in this capacity from 1951 to 1953.

Hearings of the committee held in the 1960s helped to popularize the Vietnam stab in the back myth.
