= Commander's Digest =

Commander's Digest was a biweekly periodical published by the United States Department of Defense and the Office of Information for the Armed Forces from 1960 to June 1978. After printing ceased, it was replaced by Command Policy. Its purpose was to provide "official and professional information to commanders and key personnel on matters related to Defense policies, programs and interests," and to promote "better understanding and teamwork within the Department of Defense."

In June 1967, an annual subscription cost $2.50, or single issues could be purchased from the Government Printing Office for 5 cents.
