= Lift and strike (Bosnian War) =

1993 American policy proposal

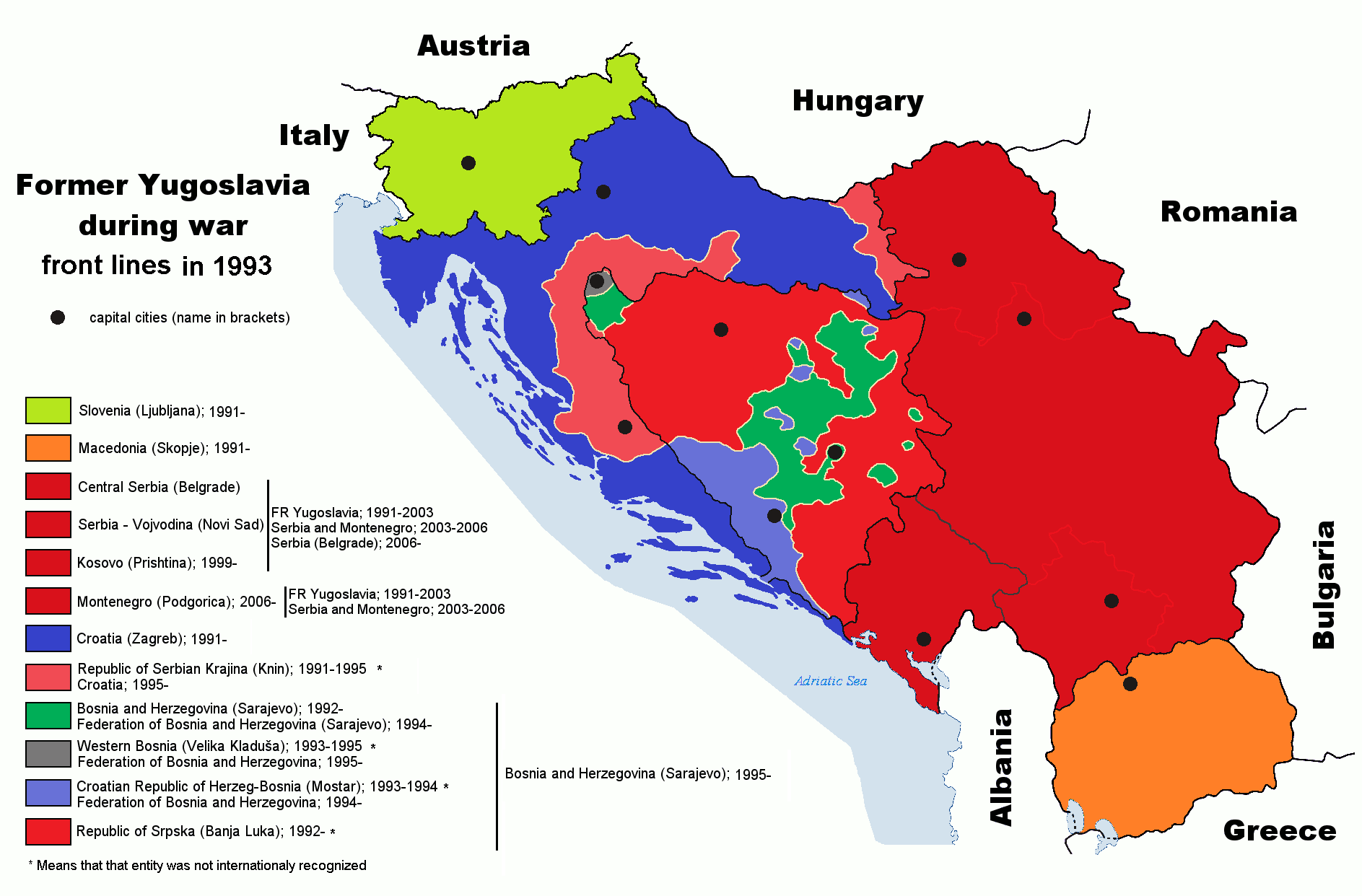
Situation in Yugoslavia in 1993. The Bosniaks were limited to the Republic of Bosnia and Herzegovina (green) and the Autonomous Province of Western Bosnia (grey); they were surrounded by hostile Serbs (shades of red).

Lift and strike was the name of a proposed policy by the Bill Clinton administration in 1993 in an attempt to improve the chances of a political settlement in the Bosnian War. It was never enacted because massive opposition in Europe and the US killed the proposal and even Clinton changed his mind.

The idea was to "lift" a United Nations arms embargo on both sides to provide the poorly-armed Bosniaks (Bosnian Muslims) with high-powered modern American weapons, thus balancing the conflict. If the Bosnian Serbs tried to stop that move, the United States Air Force and United States Navy would "strike" hard at them.

The policy had been initially suggested during George H. W. Bush's presidency in the summer of 1992 by Republic of Bosnia and Herzegovina President Alija Izetbegović, and later adopted by several US senators, including Joseph Biden. After initially opposing the policy, Bill Clinton adopted it as a part of his 1992 presidential campaign platform in an effort to distance himself from Bush on foreign policy.

After Clinton was elected, he sent newly-appointed Secretary of State Warren Christopher to visit European governments in May 1993 in an attempt to persuade them to support the strategy, Christopher met with very strong refusals from the UK, France, Germany, Italy, and Russia. British prime minister John Major told Christopher that his government would fall if he tried to lift the embargo. French president François Mitterrand said that the Serbs would retaliate against French troops in UNPROFOR, the UN force. Russian president Boris Yeltsin thought that peace negotiations were on the brink of settlement and so should not be interrupted. Germany and Italy likewise were hostile.

As Christopher returned to Washington, DC, he discovered that US support had evaporated and that the notion of 'lift and strike' was dead. US opinion was still shaped by the Vietnam Syndrome against endless wars and the memories of the Vietnam quagmire. No one could be confident that deeper and deeper involvement of American forces would lead to a quick and successful finish.

In 1994, the US Congress called for the arms embargo to be lifted, but Clinton now opposed the idea. Several important political figures had called for military intervention, including US Senator Bob Dole and former British prime minister Margaret Thatcher.

The conflict was finally brought to an end in 1995 by the Dayton Agreement, following the NATO bombing of Bosnian Serb Army positions.

== Background ==
At the beginning of the Yugoslav Wars, the United Nations Security Council passed Resolution 713 on September 25, 1991. The resolution imposed an international arms embargo on all Yugoslav territories, in an effort to prevent escalating violence. When the embargo was imposed, only the Yugoslav People's Army (JNA), which was believed to be neutral, had significant supplies of heavy weapons. However, as the conflict progressed, the JNA fell under Serb control. As a result, Serb forces from Serbia, the Republika Srpska and the Republic of Serbian Krajina inherited large weapons stockpiles from the JNA, leaving Croatia and Bosnia to struggle with what they had either captured during the Battle of the Barracks or smuggled under difficult conditions. Thus, the arms embargo "cemented an imbalance in weaponry" among the sides in the conflict. In response to the uneven situation Bosnian president Izetbegović and the Bosnian government made repeated calls to lift the arms embargo so that they could arm the Bosnian Army to resist the Serbs. Izetbegović and other Bosniak politicians also claimed that the embargo was an illegal violation of the Bosnian right to self-defense under Article 51 of the UN Charter.

== Spread of the idea ==
Starting in 1992, a number of US foreign policy experts and politicians began to warm to the idea of lifting the arms embargo to even the playing field, and some also advocated air strikes against the Serbs, as they were perceived to be the principal aggressors. In July 1992, Bill Clinton adopted the idea of lift and strike as part of his call for "real leadership" in Bosnia in an effort to strengthen his foreign policy platform. While President Bush was seen as a foreign policy expert, the Clinton team identified Bosnia as one of his weaknesses. Clinton "called on Mr. Bush to seek United Nations authorization of selective bombing of Serbian targets in Bosnia" and delivered strong rhetoric on the Bosnian crisis. In early August, in response to Congressional debate, Clinton declared himself in favor "of lifting the arms embargo on the former Yugoslav republics of Bosnia and Croatia."

Throughout August 1992, the "lift and strike" idea began to catch on in the press. New York Times correspondent Leslie Gelb proposed that US officials could "threaten air strikes against targets in Serbia...and threaten to arm the virtually defenseless Muslims...to discourage Serbia from spreading its policy of ethnic cleansing." Also, in late August, US Senator George J. Mitchell met with Izetbegović and later told reporters "that Izetbegović had made 'a very strong case that an arms embargo freezing a military imbalance in place was inherently unjust.'"

Growing support for the idea culminated in Senate Resolution 341 on September 16, 1992, which called on the president to end the arms embargo.
