= Paris Peace Accords =

1973 peace agreement between North and South Vietnam and the US

Agreement on ending the war and restoring peace in Viet-Nam
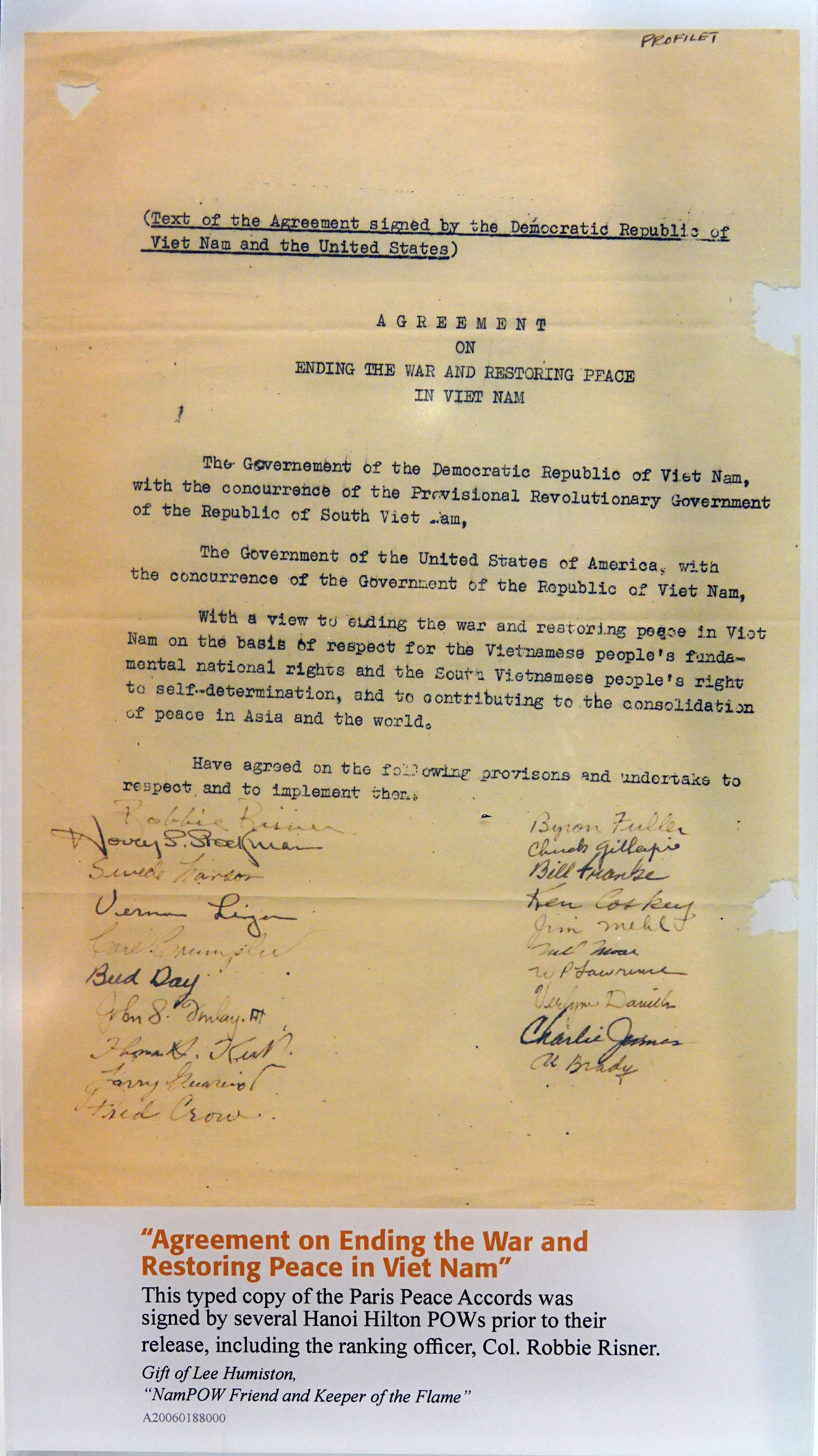
- Vietnam Peace Agreement
- Signed: January 27, 1973
- Location: Paris, France
- Negotiators: Lê Đức Thọ; Henry Kissinger
- Signatories: See below
- Parties: Democratic Republic of Vietnam; Provisional Revolutionary Government of the Republic of South Vietnam; United States; Republic of Vietnam
- Citations: UNTS Vol. 935

Full text
- Paris Peace Accords at Wikisource

The Paris Peace Accords (Vietnamese: Hiệp định Paris về Việt Nam, lit. 'Paris Treaty about Vietnam'), officially the Agreement on ending the war and restoring peace in Viet-Nam (Hiệp định về chấm dứt chiến tranh, lập lại hòa bình ở Việt Nam), was a peace agreement signed on 27 January 1973 to establish peace in Vietnam and end the Vietnam War. It included a main treaty and accompanying annexes. The agreement was registered by the United States of America on May 13, 1974, with the United Nations Secretariat. It is recorded in the United Nations Treaty Series (UNTS) under Volume 935, Treaty No.13295. The agreement entered into force upon signature and included a cease-fire, which was scheduled to take effect at 24:00 GMT on 27 January. The agreement was signed by the Democratic Republic of Vietnam (North Vietnam), the Republic of Vietnam (South Vietnam), the Provisional Revolutionary Government (PRG), and the United States. The PRG represented the Viet Cong (VC, NLF), a South Vietnamese opposition movement de facto controlled by the North. US ground forces had begun to withdraw from Vietnam in 1969, and by the beginning of 1972 those that remained had very little involvement in combat. The last American infantry battalions withdrew in August 1972. Most air and naval forces, and most advisers, also were gone from South Vietnam by that time, though air and naval forces not based in South Vietnam were still playing a symbolic role in the war. The Paris Agreement removed the remaining US forces, and direct US military intervention ended. Fighting between the three remaining powers did not stop on 28 January, even for an hour. The agreement was not formally designated a treaty, and President Nixon did not ask the US Senate to ratify it.

The negotiations that led to the accord began in 1968, after various lengthy delays. As a result of the accord, the International Control Commission (ICC) was replaced by the International Commission of Control and Supervision (ICCS), which consisted of Canada, Poland, Hungary, and Indonesia, to monitor the agreement. The main negotiators of the agreement were US National Security Advisor Henry Kissinger and the North Vietnamese Politburo member Lê Đức Thọ. Both men were awarded the 1973 Nobel Peace Prize for their efforts, but Lê Đức Thọ refused to accept it. The agreement contained two notable provisions that represented concessions to both North and South Vietnam: North Vietnamese troops (PAVN) were allowed to remain in the South, and the Republic of Vietnam government in Saigon led by President Thiệu was allowed to continue to exist rather than be replaced by a coalition government.

The agreement's provisions were immediately and frequently broken by both North and South Vietnamese forces with no official response from the United States. Open fighting broke out in March 1973, and North Vietnamese offensives enlarged their territory by the end of the year. Two years later, a massive North Vietnamese offensive conquered South Vietnam on April 30, and the two countries, which had been separated since 1954, united once more in 1975, as the Socialist Republic of Vietnam.

Part of the negotiations took place in the former residence of the French painter Fernand Léger; it was bequeathed to the French Communist Party (PCF). The street of the house was named after General Philippe Leclerc de Hauteclocque, who had commanded French forces in Indochina from 1945 until July 1946.

== Provisions ==
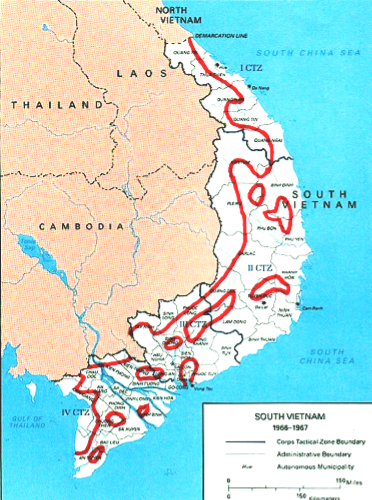
The approximate areas of control at the time of the signing of the Accord. The South Vietnamese government controlled about 80 percent of the territory and 90 percent of the population, although many areas were contested.

The agreement generally called for:

- The recognition of two separate states: North Vietnam and South Vietnam.
- A cease-fire at 24:00 GMT on January 27 (07:00 Hanoi Time Zone or 08:00 Saigon Standard Time on January 28).
- The ban of North Vietnam's military involvement or intervention in the internal affairs of South Vietnam.
- The withdrawal of all US and allied forces within sixty days, the NVA was forbidden from deploying troops into South Vietnam.
- The return of prisoners of war parallel to the above.
- The clearing of mines from North Vietnamese ports by the US.
- The recognition of the temporary border between the two Vietnams.
- The respect for South Vietnam's sovereignty and self-determination.
- The United States was permitted to continue providing aid to South Vietnam.
- North Vietnam shall not impose any political tendency or personality on the South Vietnamese people.
- The recognition of neutral political force in South Vietnam.
- The recognition of both the Viet Cong and the South Vietnam.
- The establishment of a tripartite reconciliation council in the South consisting of the South Vietnam, the Viet Cong, and neutralists.
- The acceptance of communist forces' participation in the South Vietnam's government through free elections.
- The North Vietnam's non-interference in the question of South Vietnamese armed forces.
- The normalization of US-North Vietnam relations.
- The reunification of Vietnam through peaceful means without coercion or annexation by either party.
- The establishment of "Joint Military Commissions" composed of the four parties and an "International Commission of Control and Supervision" composed of Canada, Hungary, Indonesia, and Poland to implement the cease-fire. Both operate by unanimity.
- The withdrawal of all foreign troops from Laos and Cambodia, and the closure of the Ho Chi Minh Trail.
- A ban on the introduction of war material in South Vietnam unless on a replacement basis.
- A ban on introducing further military personnel into South Vietnam from the enforcement of the cease-fire to the formation of the government.

== Paris peace negotiations ==
=== Background and early deadlocks ===
1971 newsreel about the peace talks

In July 1954, the First Indochina War ended with the victory of communist insurgency over the French Union's coalition, Vietnam was divided at the 17th parallel with the pro-French State of Vietnam (predecessor of the Republic of Vietnam) holding the South and the communists taking power in the North under the name of the Democratic Republic of Vietnam. This division was a political defeat for the communists. However, the communists hoped to unify Vietnam under a communist model through a general election. Facing a likely defeat in an election, Ngo Dinh Diem, the South Vietnamese dictator, cancelled plans for a nationwide election. War between North and South Vietnam broke out in the context of the global Cold War, and the United States supported the pro-Western South as an ally. South Vietnam experienced significant internal turmoil, including the Buddhist Crisis and the removal of Diem in an American backed coup. Although the United States and its allies won a major victory in the 1968 Tet Offensive, the campaign sparked a strong rise of the American anti-war movement. Following the strong showing of anti-war candidate Eugene McCarthy in the New Hampshire primary, in March 1968 US President Lyndon B. Johnson halted bombing operations over the northern portion of North Vietnam (Operation Rolling Thunder), in order to encourage Hanoi (the perceived locus of the insurgency) to begin negotiations. Although some sources state that the bombing halt decision announced on March 31, 1968, was related to events occurring within the White House and the Presidents counsel of Secretary of Defense Clark Clifford and others rather than the events in New Hampshire. Shortly thereafter, Hanoi agreed to discuss a complete halt of the bombing, and a date was set for representatives of both parties to meet in Paris. The sides first met on May 10, with the delegations headed by Xuân Thuỷ, who would remain the official leader of the North Vietnamese delegation throughout the process, and US ambassador-at-large W. Averell Harriman.

For five months, the negotiations stalled as North Vietnam demanded that all bombing of North Vietnam be stopped, while the US side demanded that North Vietnam agree to a reciprocal de-escalation in South Vietnam; it was not until October 31 that Johnson agreed to end the air strikes and serious negotiations could begin.

One of the largest hurdles to effective negotiation was that North Vietnam and its National Liberation Front (NLF, VC, Viet Cong) in the South, refused to recognize the South Vietnamese government in Saigon; with equal persistence, the South Vietnamese government refused to acknowledge the legitimacy of the NLF. Harriman resolved this dispute by developing a system by which North Vietnam and U.S. would be the named parties; NLF officials could join the North Vietnam team without being recognized by South Vietnam, while Saigon's representatives joined their US allies.

A similar debate concerned the shape of the table to be used at the conference. The North favored a circular table, in which all parties, including NLF representatives, would appear to be "equal"' in importance. The South Vietnamese argued that only a rectangular table was acceptable, for only a rectangle could show two distinct sides to the conflict. Eventually a compromise was reached, in which representatives of the northern and southern governments would sit at a circular table, with members representing all other parties sitting at individual square tables around them.

=== Negotiations and the Nixon campaign ===
Bryce Harlow, a former White House staff member in the Eisenhower administration, claimed to have "a double agent working in the White House....I kept Nixon informed." Harlow and Henry Kissinger (who was friendly with both campaigns and guaranteed a job in either a Humphrey or Nixon administration in the upcoming election) separately predicted Johnson's "bombing halt." Democratic senator George Smathers informed President Johnson that "the word is out that we are making an effort to throw the election to Humphrey. Nixon has been told of it."

According to presidential historian Robert Dallek, Kissinger's advice "rested not on special knowledge of decision making at the White House but on an astute analyst's insight into what was happening." CIA intelligence analyst William Bundy stated that Kissinger obtained "no useful inside information" from his trip to Paris, and "almost any experienced Hanoi watcher might have come to the same conclusion." While Kissinger may have "hinted that his advice was based on contacts with the Paris delegation," this sort of "self-promotion...is at worst a minor and not uncommon practice, quite different from getting and reporting real secrets."

Nixon asked prominent Chinese-American politician Anna Chennault to be his "channel to Mr. Thieu"; Chennault agreed and periodically reported to John Mitchell that Thieu had no intention of attending a peace conference. On November 2, Chennault informed the South Vietnamese ambassador: "I have just heard from my boss in Albuquerque who says his boss [Nixon] is going to win. And you tell your boss [Thieu] to hold on a while longer." Johnson found out through the NSA and was enraged saying that Nixon had "blood on his hands" and that Senate Minority Leader Everett Dirksen agreed with Johnson that such action was "treason." Defense Secretary Clark Clifford considered the moves an illegal violation of the Logan Act.

In response, Johnson ordered the wire-tapping of members of the Nixon campaign. Dallek wrote that Nixon's efforts "probably made no difference" because Thieu was unwilling to attend the talks and there was little chance of an agreement being reached before the election; however, his use of information provided by Harlow and Kissinger was morally questionable, and vice president Humphrey's decision not to make Nixon's actions public was "an uncommon act of political decency."

=== Nixon administration ===
After winning the 1968 presidential election, Richard Nixon became president of the US in January 1969. He then replaced US ambassador Harriman with Henry Cabot Lodge Jr., who was later replaced by David Bruce. Also that year, the NLF set up a Provisional Revolutionary Government (PRG) to gain government status at the talks. However, the primary negotiations that led to the agreement did not occur at the Peace Conference at all but were carried out during secret negotiations between Kissinger and Lê Đức Thọ, which began on August 4, 1969.

North Vietnam insisted for three years that the agreement could not be concluded unless the United States agreed to remove South Vietnamese President Thiệu from power and replace him with someone more acceptable to Hanoi. Nixon and Kissinger were unwilling to sign an agreement to overthrow a government the NLF had failed to overthrow by force of arms, though the extent of North Vietnamese demands is contested. Historian Marilyn B. Young, contends that the contents of Hanoi's proposal were systematically distorted from their original plea to permit Thiệu's replacement, to what Kissinger propagated as a demand for his overthrow.

=== Breakthrough and agreement ===
On May 8, 1972, Nixon made a major concession to North Vietnam by announcing that the US would accept a cease-fire in place as a precondition for its military withdrawal. In other words, the US would withdraw its forces from South Vietnam without North Vietnam doing the same. The concession broke a deadlock and resulted in progress in the talks over the next few months.

The final major breakthrough came on October 8, 1972. Prior to this, North Vietnam had been disappointed by the results of its Nguyen Hue Offensive (known in the West as the Easter Offensive), which had resulted in the United States countering with "Operation Linebacker", a significant air bombing campaign that blunted the North's drive in the South as well as inflicting damage in the North. The South Vietnamese army with massive US fire support eventually successfully pushed back the PAVN. Also, the North Vietnamese feared increased isolation if Nixon's efforts at détente significantly improved US relations with the chief communist powers, the Soviet Union and the People's Republic of China, who were backing the North Vietnamese military effort. During this year, Nixon visited China to improve US-China relations amid the Sino-Soviet split. In a meeting with Kissinger, Thọ significantly modified his bargaining line, allowing that the Saigon government could remain in power and that negotiations between the two South Vietnamese parties could develop a final settlement. Within 10 days the secret talks drew up a final draft. Kissinger held a press conference in Washington during which he announced that "peace is at hand."

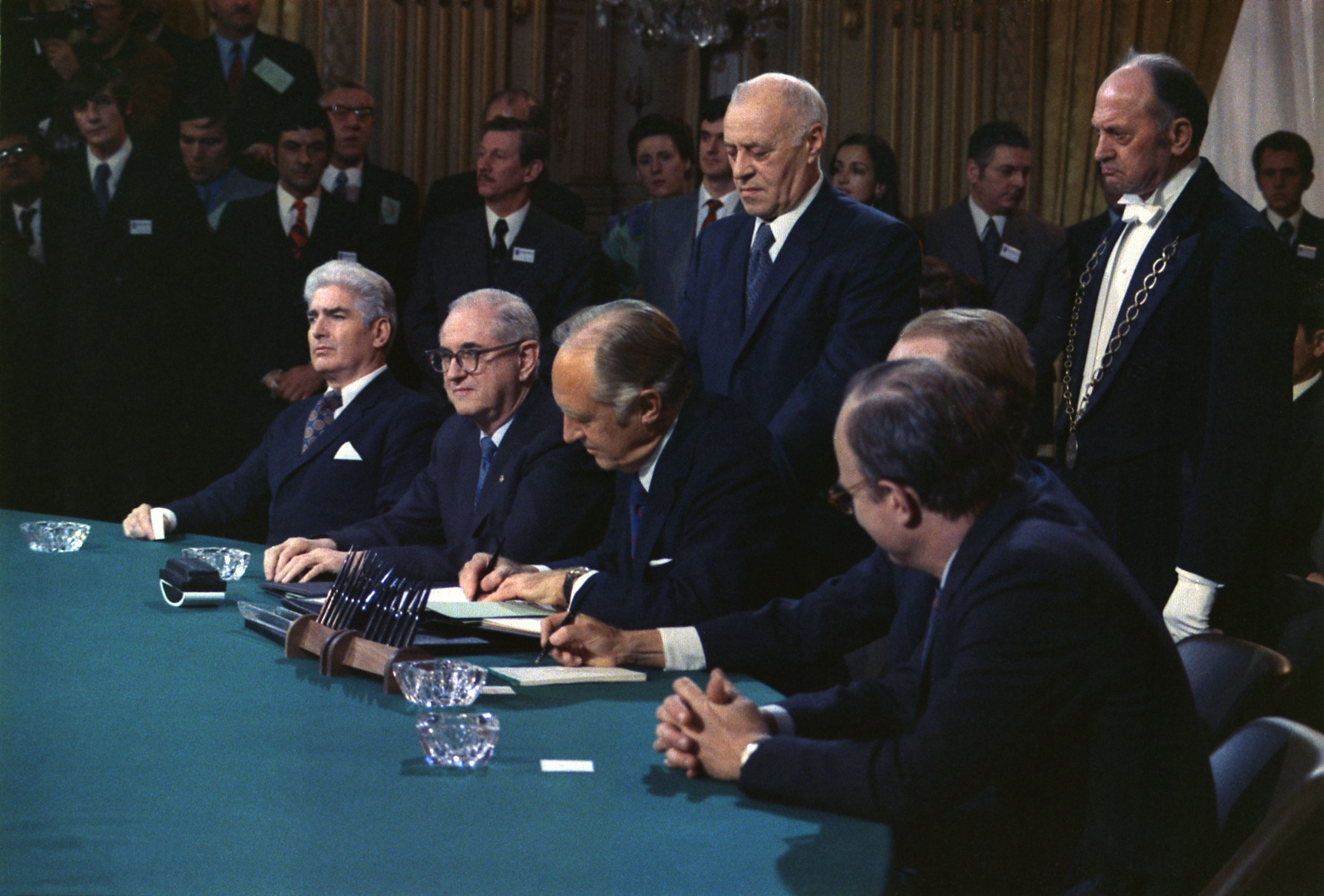
Signing the peace accords

When Thiệu, who had not even been informed of the secret negotiations, was presented with the draft of the new agreement, he was furious with Kissinger and Nixon (who were perfectly aware of South Vietnam's negotiating position) and refused to accept it without significant changes. He then made several public radio addresses, claiming that the proposed agreement was worse than it actually was. Hanoi was flabbergasted, believing that it had been duped into a propaganda ploy by Kissinger. On October 26, Radio Hanoi broadcast key details of the draft agreement.

However, as US casualties had mounted throughout the conflict since 1965, American domestic support for the war had deteriorated, and by late 1972 there was major pressure on the Nixon administration to withdraw from the war. Consequently, the US brought great diplomatic pressure upon their South Vietnamese ally to sign the agreement even if the concessions Thiệu wanted could not be achieved. Nixon pledged to provide continued substantial aid to South Vietnam and given his recent landslide victory in the presidential election, it seemed possible that he would be able to follow through on that pledge. To demonstrate his seriousness to Thiệu, Nixon ordered the heavy Operation Linebacker II bombings of North Vietnam in December 1972. Nixon also attempted to bolster South Vietnam's military forces by ordering that large quantities of US military material and equipment be given to South Vietnam from May to December 1972 under Operations Enhance and Enhance Plus. These operations were also designed to keep North Vietnam at the negotiating table and to prevent them from abandoning negotiations and seeking total victory. When the North Vietnamese government agreed to resume "technical" discussions with the United States, Nixon ordered a halt to bombings north of the 20th parallel on December 30. With the US committed to disengagement (and after threats from Nixon that South Vietnam would be abandoned if he did not agree), Thiệu had little choice but to accede.

On January 15, 1973, Nixon announced a suspension of offensive actions against North Vietnam. Kissinger and Thọ met again on January 23 and signed off on an agreement that was basically identical to the draft of three months earlier. The agreement was signed by the leaders of the official delegations on January 27, 1973, at the Hotel Majestic in Paris.

== Aftermath ==
Balance of military forces (January 1973)
South Vietnamese armed forces
Ground combat regulars	210,000
Regional and Popular Force militias	510,000
Service troops	200,000
Total	920,000
Communist armed forces
North Vietnamese ground troops in South Vietnam	123,000
Viet Cong ground troops	25,000
Service troops	71,000
Total	219,000

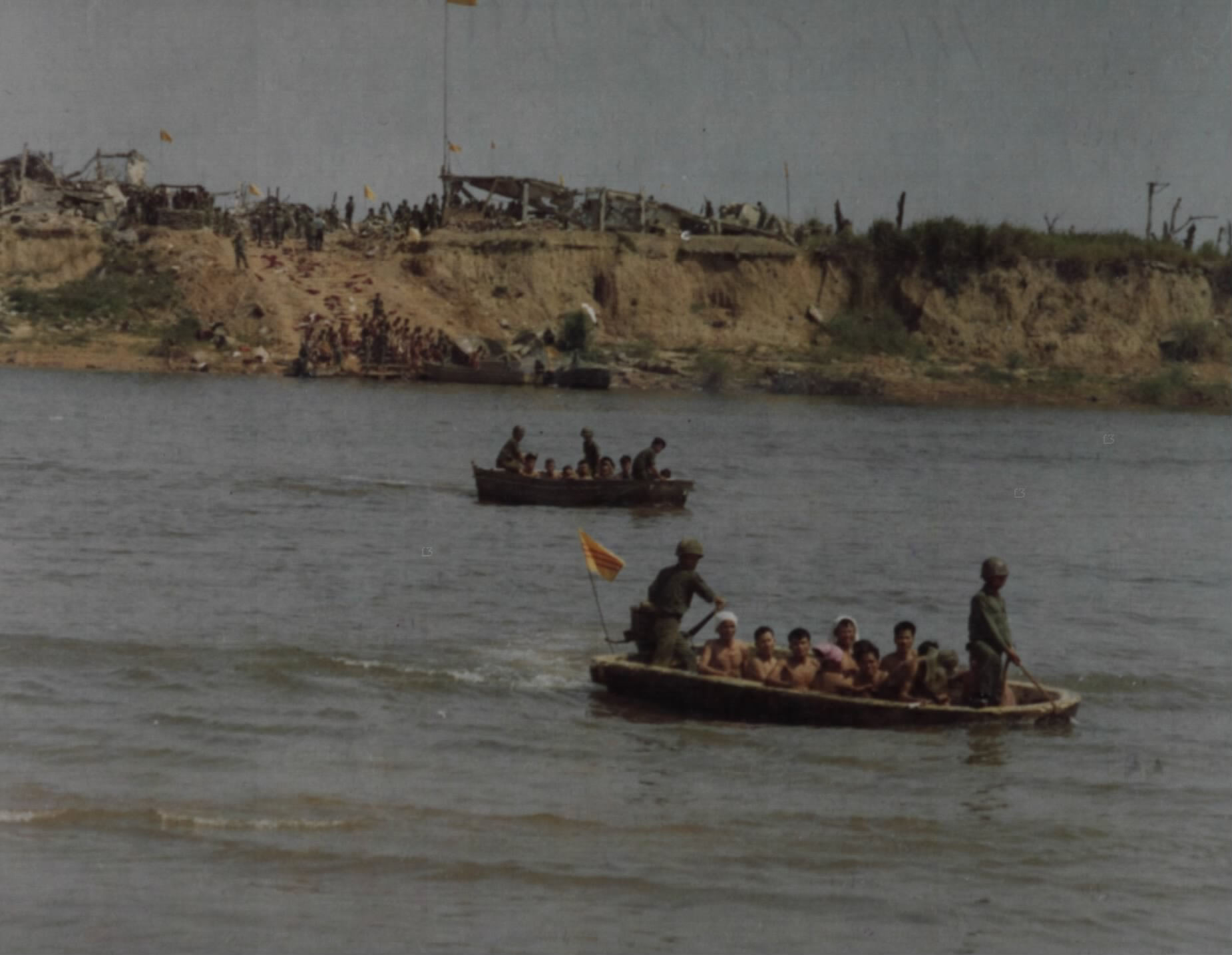
PAVN prisoners released, Thạch Hãn River, 24 February 1973

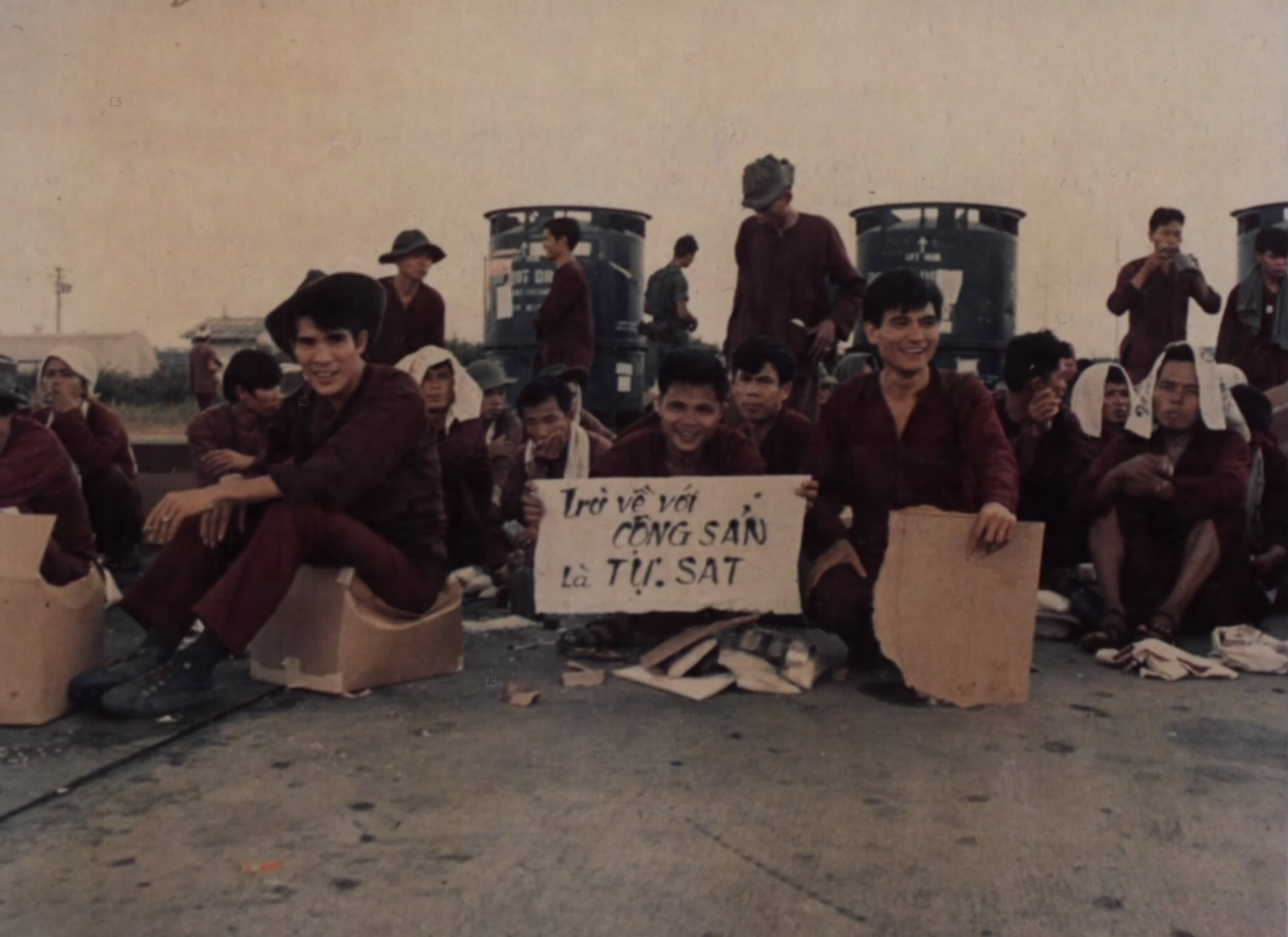
210 prisoners from the Bien Hoa POW Camp refuse repatriation and want to remain in South Vietnam sit with signs at Bien Hoa Air Base, 25 March

The Paris Peace Accords effectively removed the US from the conflict in Vietnam, however the PAVN was allowed to stay in the South. The United States had no formal bilateral military treaty with Saigon. Prisoners from both sides were exchanged, with American ones primarily released during Operation Homecoming. Around 31,961 North Vietnamese/VC prisoners (26,880 military, 5,081 civilians) were released in return for 5,942 South Vietnamese prisoners.

The Paris Peace Accords opened up further negotiations between the United States and North Vietnam as well as between the South Vietnamese parties, however the story did not go smoothly in South Vietnam. The agreement's provisions were routinely flouted by both the North Vietnamese and the South Vietnamese governments, eliciting no response from the United States, and ultimately resulting in the communists enlarging the area under their control by the end of 1973. The Paris Peace Accords in January 1973 failed to end the fighting in South Vietnam, as North Vietnam immediately violated the cease-fire and attempted to make territorial gains, resulting in large battles. The communists also continued to send weapons and soldiers into the South. Sporadic clashes continued to occur between North and South Vietnam in South Vietnam and Cambodia. North Vietnamese military forces gradually built up their military infrastructure in the areas they controlled, and two years later were in a position to launch the successful offensive that ended South Vietnam's status as an independent country. Fighting began almost immediately after the agreement was signed, due to a series of mutual retaliations, and by March 1973 full-fledged war had resumed.

In late 1973, the communists issued Resolution 21, which called for "strategic raids" against South Vietnam to gain territory and to gauge the reaction of Thiệu and the American government. This started between March and November 1974, when the communists attacked Quang Duc Province and Biên Hòa. The US failed to respond to the communist violations and the ARVN lost a lot of supplies in the fighting. Anti-communist Thiệu also expressed his stance on the ceasefire by publicly proclaiming the "Four Nos": no negotiations with the communists; no communist political activities south of the Demilitarized Zone (DMZ); no coalition government; and no surrender of territory to the North Vietnamese or PRG. Thiệu believed the American promise to reintroduce air power against the communists if they made any serious violations of the agreement, and he and his government also assumed that US aid would continue to be forthcoming at previous levels. After two clashes that left 55 South Vietnamese soldiers dead, President Thiệu announced on 4 January 1974 that the war had restarted and that the Paris Peace Accord was no longer in effect. There were over 25,000 South Vietnamese casualties during the ceasefire period.

Nixon had secretly promised Thiệu that he would use airpower to support the South Vietnamese government should it be necessary. During his confirmation hearings in June 1973, Secretary of Defense James Schlesinger was sharply criticized by some senators after he stated that he would recommend resumption of US bombing in North Vietnam if North Vietnam launched a major offensive against South Vietnam, but by August 15, 1973, 95% of American troops and their allies had left Vietnam (both North and South) as well as Cambodia and Laos under the Case-Church Amendment. The amendment, which was approved by the US Congress in June 1973, prohibited further US military activity in Vietnam, Laos and Cambodia unless the president secured Congressional approval in advance. However, during this time, Nixon was being driven from office due to the Watergate scandal, which led to his resignation in 1974. In 1973–74, US funding was slashed to $965 million, a reduction of more than 50%. While South Vietnam still fought effectively in 1973–74, sharp cuts in US aid crippled Saigon's economy and military, reducing the morale of the soldiers. The aid cuts meant that an artillery piece could only fire four rounds a day, and each soldier had only 85 bullets per month. Due to lack of fuel and spare parts, air force transport operations shrank by up to 70%. The global 1973 oil crisis also devastated the South Vietnamese free market economy.

After the communists launched a major invasion of Phước Long in mid-December 1974, the US army did not directly help South Vietnam and the province was finally captured on 6 January 1975, this created confidence among the communists that the United States would not intervene militarily and they planned to take over the South in 1976. When the North Vietnamese began their final offensive early in 1975, the US Congress refused to appropriate increased military assistance for South Vietnam, citing strong opposition to the war by Americans and the loss of American equipment to the North by retreating Southern forces. After the defeat at Buon Me Thuot in March 1975, Thiệu ordered his army to abandon the Central Highlands, but the retreat turned into disaster and chaos. Realizing the opportunity was ripe, North Vietnam decided to accelerate the deadline for taking over the South by force from 1976 to 1975. The communists demanded that Thiệu resign as a precondition for peace. Thiệu subsequently resigned on April 21, accusing the US of betrayal in a TV and radio address:

At the time of the peace agreement the United States agreed to only replace equipment on a one-by-one basis. But the United States did not keep its word. Is an American's word reliable these days? The United States did not keep its promise to help us fight for freedom and it was in the same fight that the United States lost 50,000 of its young men.

According to the provisions of the 1967 Constitution, Vice President Trần Văn Hương replaced Thiệu. Both the United States and South Vietnam hoped for the establishment of a coalition government with the PRG in South Vietnam to save peace and prevent the South from falling into the hands of communism. However because of their great military advantage, the communists rejected Saigon's offer to form a coalition government. The Vietnam War ended when South Vietnamese President Dương Văn Minh, a left-wing neutralist taking power on April 28 by congressional designation, surrendered to the PAVN on the radio two day later. The North Vietnamese-controlled PRG became the new government of South Vietnam. Schlesinger had announced early in the morning of April 29 the beginning of Operation Frequent Wind, which entailed the evacuation of the last US diplomatic, military and civilian personnel from Saigon via helicopter, which was completed in the early morning hours of April 30. Not only did North Vietnam conquer South Vietnam, but the communists were also victorious in Cambodia when the Khmer Rouge captured Phnom Penh on April 17, as were the communist Pathet Lao in Laos successful in taking power peacefully in Laos on December 2. Like Saigon, US civilian and military personnel were evacuated from Phnom Penh, US diplomatic presence in Vientiane was significantly downgraded, and the number of remaining US personnel was severely reduced. After the fall of the Republic of Vietnam, the United States imposed a trade embargo on all of Vietnam until 1994. US$3.3 billion in reconstruction aid for North Vietnam, which U.S. president Richard Nixon had secretly promised in the form of a letter offering a specific figures after the Paris Peace Accords, was refused by the US on the grounds that North Vietnam violated the agreement.

After taking over South Vietnam, North Vietnam advocated rapid unification. North Vietnam and the PRG applied to join the United Nations as separate states in July 1975 but were vetoed by the United States both times in September on the grounds that the Soviet Union and China vetoed South Korea's application for membership in August. The communists legitimized their rule over all of Vietnam by holding a consultative conference in November and holding joint parliamentary elections in April 1976 to establish the Socialist Republic on July 2. The United States refused to recognize the new state until 1995, four years after the collapse of the Soviet Union and most other communist countries. In 1997, Vietnam agreed to formally drop its request that the U.S. honors its 1973 aid commitment and instead to pay off the debts of former South Vietnam, then amounting to $140 million, in order to be allowed to trade with the U.S.

== Assessment ==
According to Finnish historian Jussi Hanhimäki, due to triangular diplomacy (US–China–USSR) which isolated it, South Vietnam was "pressurized into accepting an agreement that virtually ensured its collapse." During negotiations, Kissinger stated that the United States would not intervene militarily 18 months after an agreement, but that it might intervene before that. In Vietnam War historiography, this has been termed the "decent interval."

== Signatories ==
- (North Vietnam) Nguyen Duy Trinh, Minister for Foreign Affairs for the Democratic Republic of Vietnam
- Nguyễn Thị Bình, Minister for Foreign Affairs for the Provisional Revolutionary Government of the Republic of South Vietnam
- William P. Rogers, United States Secretary of State
- (South Vietnam) Trần Văn Lắm, Minister for Foreign Affairs for the Republic of Vietnam

== Other key figures in the negotiations ==
- Henry Cabot Lodge Jr., former United States Ambassador to South Vietnam, head of the US delegation
- Henry Kissinger, special advisor of the President of the United States
- (United States) William J. Porter
- (North Vietnam) Xuân Thủy, head of delegation of the Democratic Republic of Vietnam
- (North Vietnam) Lê Đức Thọ, special advisor of the government of Democratic Republic of Vietnam
