= Luke Nichter =

American historian

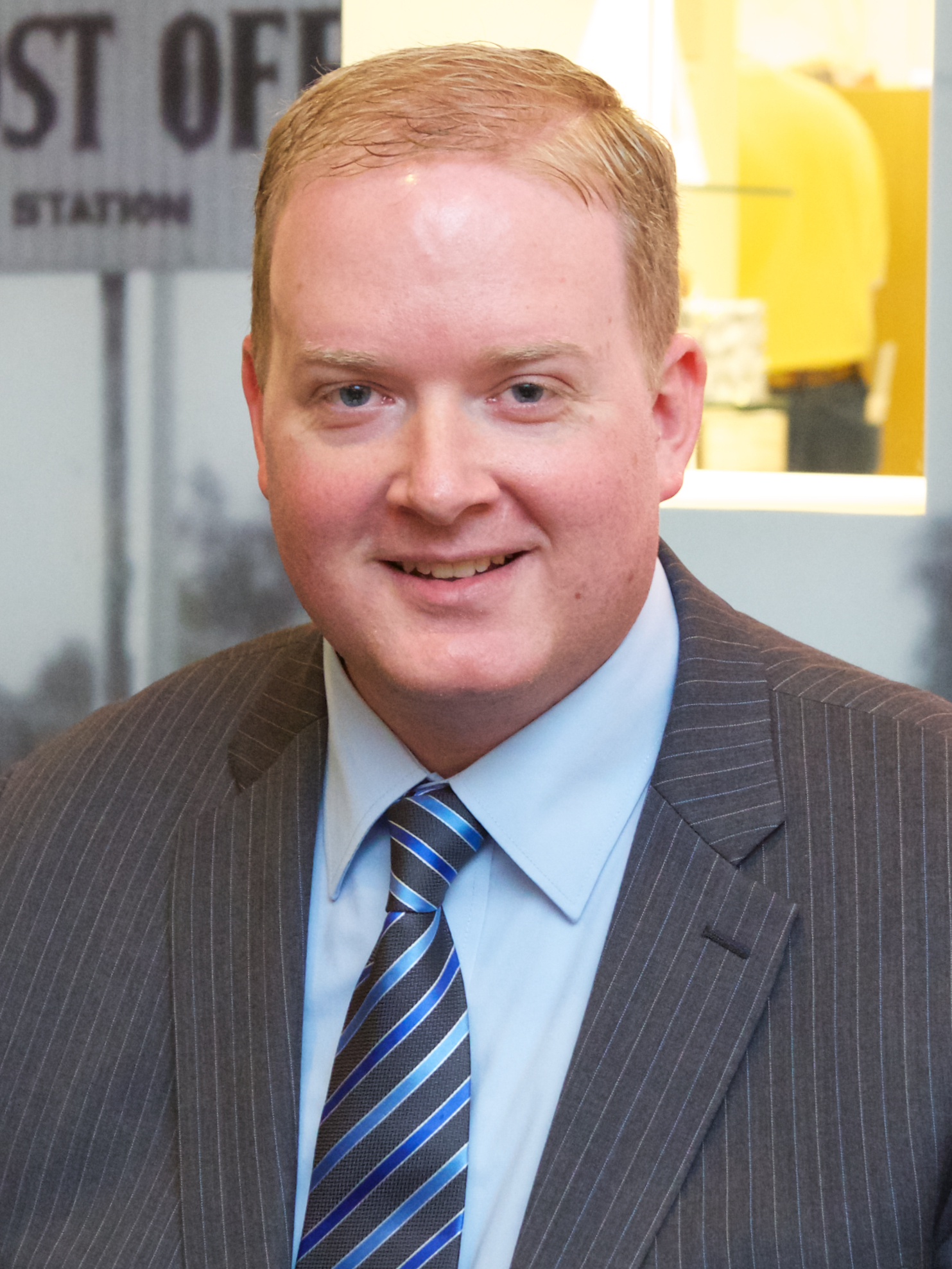
Nichter in 2014

Luke A. Nichter is an American professor of history and the James H. Cavanaugh Endowed Chair in Presidential Studies at Chapman University. In 2009, he filed a court case which resulted in the declassification of most of the records concerning U.S. v. Liddy, the Watergate break-ins case.

== Works ==
- Nichter, Luke A. (2012). George W. Bush: Life of Privilege, Leadership in Crisis. Nova Science Publisher's. ISBN 978-1-62081-213-6.
- Nichter, Luke A. (2013). Lyndon B. Johnson: Pursuit of Populism, Paradox of Power. Nova Science Publisher's, Incorporated. ISBN 978-1-62618-624-8.
- Nichter, Luke A. (2014). Richard M. Nixon: In the Arena, from Valley to Mountaintop. Nova Publishers. ISBN 978-1-63117-546-6.
- Brinkley, Douglas; Nichter, Luke, eds. (2014). The Nixon Tapes, 1971-1972. Houghton Mifflin Harcourt. ISBN 978-0-544-27415-0.
- Brinkley, Douglas; Nichter, Luke, eds. (2015). The Nixon Tapes: 1973. Houghton Mifflin Harcourt. ISBN 978-0-544-61053-8.
- Nichter, Luke (2015). Richard Nixon and Europe: the Reshaping of the Postwar Atlantic World. Cambridge University Press. ISBN 978-1-107-09458-1.
- Nichter, Luke A. (2020). The Last Brahmin: Henry Cabot Lodge Jr. and the Making of the Cold War. Yale University Press. ISBN 978-0-300-21780-3.
- Nichter, Luke A. (2023). The Year That Broke Politics: Collusion and Chaos in the Presidential Election of 1968. Yale University Press. ISBN 978-0-300-25439-6.
