= Ken Hughes (historian) =

American historian

Ken Hughes is an American presidential historian who works at the Miller Center of Public Affairs. He has studied the Nixon administration and is an expert on the Nixon tapes and Watergate.

== Works ==
- Hughes, Ken (2014). Chasing Shadows: The Nixon Tapes, the Chennault Affair, and the Origins of Watergate. University of Virginia Press. ISBN 978-0-8139-3664-2.
- Hughes, Ken (2015). Fatal Politics: The Nixon Tapes, the Vietnam War, and the Casualties of Reelection. University of Virginia Press. ISBN 978-0-8139-3803-5.
