= Does America Need a Foreign Policy? =

2001 book by Henry Kissinger

Does America Need a Foreign Policy?: Toward a Diplomacy for the 21st Century
- First edition
- Author: Henry Kissinger
- Language: English
- Genre: Non-fiction
- Publisher: Simon & Schuster
- Publication date: 2001
- Publication place: United States
- ISBN: 0-684-85567-4

Does America Need a Foreign Policy?: Toward a Diplomacy for the 21st Century is a 2001 book by Henry Kissinger.

== Editions ==
- Simon and Schuster, New York, United States ISBN 0-684-85567-4
