= American Foreign Policy: Three Essays =

1969 book by Henry Kissinger

First edition (publ. W. W. Norton)

American Foreign Policy: Three Essays is a 1969 book by Henry Kissinger that outlines his views of the international political structure. It is composed of essays on diplomacy and several speeches he made during his political career.
