= 4950th Test Group =

4950th Test Group (Nuclear)
- Active: 1956-1961
- Country: United States
- Branch: United States Air Force
- Type: Atmospheric Nuclear Testing

The 4950th Test Group (Nuclear) is an inactive United States Air Force unit. It was last was assigned to Air Force Special Weapons Center, stationed at Kirtland AFB, New Mexico. It was inactivated on 16 August 1961.

The mission of the unit was to serve as a permanent United States Air Force Air Task Group for atmospheric testing. With the phase-down of atmospheric testing activities as a result of the 1958 moratorium between the United States and Soviet Union, in August 1961 the unit was disestablished.

== History ==
On 1 September 1956, Air Force Special Weapons Command organized the 4950th Test Group (Nuclear) to serve as a permanent USAF Air Task Group for atmospheric nuclear testing. Throughout the remainder of the 1950s, the 4950th Test Group (Nuclear)—as the representative of the USAF—supported the various Nevada and Pacific test series. Nuclear tests supported by the group were:

- 1957 Operation Plumbob
- 1957-1958 Project 58, Project 58A
- 1958 Operation Hardtack I
- 1958 Operation Argus
- 1958 Operation Hardtack II

In 1958 a voluntary nuclear test moratorium was being considered, spurred by worldwide concern about the fallout of radionuclides from clouds blown around the Earth after atmospheric tests. In January, the ARDC began a study to determine the effects of a test moratorium on the USAF nuclear capabilities. In August, President Dwight D. Eisenhower proposed that an international conference be called to discuss permanent suspension of nuclear and thermonuclear weapons testing. He also announced that on 31 October the U.S. would suspend nuclear testing for a period of one year. The Hardtack II test series ended on 30 October and the test ban went into effect on 31 October. The Soviet Union also suspended testing, though both nations reserved the right to resume testing.

At first, no dramatic changes occurred. There were no changes in units, facilities, or responsibilities. The 4950th Test Group continued with AFSWC activities in the interim. However, in August 1959, phase down of the 4950th Test Group (Nuclear) at Eniwetok was approved and the facility moved into maintenance standby status. In October, the AFSWC proposed further reorganizations of the 4950th Test Group (Nuclear), but these proposals were not carried out. The 4950th Test Group (Nuclear) was given responsibility for Eniwetok buildup in the event that testing was resumed.

In 1960, the 4926th Test Squadron (Sampling) moved from the 4950th Test Group (Nuclear) and consolidated with other organizations into the 4925th Test Group (Atomic). The 4951st Support Squadron (Test) was discontinued at Eniwetok, and base supplies and personnel transferred to Kirtland AFB. The USAF also directed the transfer of Indian Springs AFB from the ARDC to Tactical Air Command, which occurred 1 April 1961, and AFSWC recommended discontinuation of the 4950th Test Group.

As the phase-down of testing activities continued during the moratorium, in August 1961 the 4950th Test Group (Nuclear) was inactivated on 16 August 1961.

== Units ==
- 4926th Test Squadron (Sampling)
- 4951st Support Squadron (Test)
- 4930th Test Support Group for operations at Eniwetok Atoll, Pacific Test Range
- 4935th Air Base Squadron, GSU at Indian Springs Air Force Auxiliary Field, Nevada

To support USAF activities at the Atomic Energy Commission Nevada Test Site during atmospheric nuclear testing.
