= Kirtland Underground Munitions Maintenance and Storage Complex =

Nuclear Weapons storage facility in New Mexico, United States

Coordinates: 35.0085°N 106.5495°W

Kirtland Underground Munitions Maintenance and Storage Complex (KUMMSC) is a United States Air Force facility which provides for the storage, shipping and maintenance of the nuclear weapons arsenal of the United States. KUMMSC is the largest storage facility for nuclear weapons in the world.

The complex, which opened in 1992, is located on a 54-acre site at Kirtland Air Force Base in Albuquerque, New Mexico, United States, under the control of the Air Force Global Strike Command. It is operated by the 898th Munitions Squadron (898 MUNS) and the 377th Weapons Systems Security Squadron (377 WSSS). The facility is state of the art, with more than 300,000 square feet (28,000 m2) located entirely underground.

KUMMSC is close to the Pantex facility in Texas and is also used to store weapons designated for disposal there. Munitions stored at the site include gravity bombs (B61 and B83), and W80 and W87 warheads.
