= Defense Nuclear Weapons School =

The Defense Nuclear Weapons School (DNWS) is housed on Kirtland Air Force Base in Albuquerque, New Mexico, and is administered by the Nuclear Enterprise Directorate of the Defense Threat Reduction Agency. The school teaches courses on Consequence Assessment, Hazard Prediction, Ordnance Disposal, and other WMD-related coursework.

== Mission ==
DTRA provides education and training related to countering weapons of mass destruction (CWMD). Through the Defense Nuclear Weapons School (DNWS), DTRA prepares military personnel, federal, state, and local government agencies, and allied partners to face these threats.

== Training Objectives ==
DNWS is located at Kirtland Air Force Base, New Mexico, and traces its history back to the Manhattan Project. It provides training in radiological and nuclear weapons, nuclear and radiological incident command and control, incident response, and Chemical, Biological, Radiological, Nuclear and Explosives (CBRNE) modeling for DoD and other federal, state, and local agencies.

== Nuclear Weapons Instructional Museum (NWIM) ==
DNWS manages and operates the only classified Nuclear Weapons Instructional Museum (NWIM) in the DoD. A member of the American Alliance of Museums, the NWIM traces the history and development of the U.S. nuclear weapons stockpile from its inception to the present. The NWIM contains displays of all stockpiled U.S. nuclear weapons and their associated components and delivery systems, as well as related training aids.

== Leadership (newest to oldest) ==
	Name	Rank	Service	Start	End
1	Walter Zacherl	Colonel	U.S. Army	June 2024	Present
2	Scott Smith	Colonel	U.S. Army	August 2023	June 2024
3	Christopher Whelan	Colonel	U.S. Army	June 2021	May 2023
4	George Farfour	Colonel	U.S. Air Force	June 2020	June 2021
5					
