= 4900th Flight Test Group =

4900th Test Group
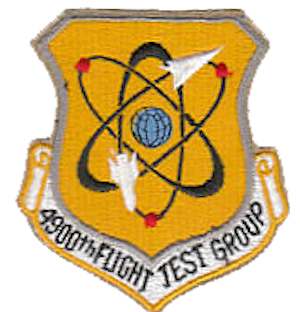
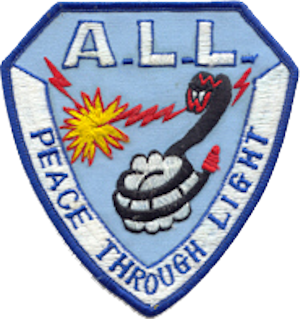
- Emblem of the 4900th Test Group and Advanced Laser Laboratory (ALL) NKC-135A
- Active: 1970-1976
- Country: United States
- Branch: United States Air Force
- Type: Special Flight Testing

The 4900th Test Group is an inactive United States Air Force unit. Its last was assigned to Air Force Systems Command at Kirtland AFB, New Mexico, where it was inactivated on 1 April 1976.

== History ==
The unit was activated by Air Force Systems Command on 1 August 1970 as the 4900th Test Group (Flight Test) and assigned directly to the command. Its mission was to conduct flight test programs of advanced airborne laser weapons for the co-located Air Force Special Weapons Center Advanced Radiation Technology Office.

The group operated a fleet of five F-4Ds, one RF-4C, five NKC-135As, three NC-135As, five C-130s, U-3Bs, and several A-37s, F-100s, UH-1F, and UH-1N until deactivated on 1 April 1976.
