= Kirtland AFB UFO sighting =

The Kirtland AFB UFO sighting could suggest either of two incidents, separated by a number of years, but initially refers to an observation (and possible radar contact) of an unidentified flying object at Kirtland Air Force Base, Albuquerque, New Mexico, late in 1957. The Air Force concluded the witnesses misidentified a conventional aircraft.

== The sighting ==
The incident took place on 4 November 1957, at around 22:45 MST. Two Civil Aeronautics Administration controllers in the tower at Kirtland AFB, R. M. Kaser and E. G. Brink, claimed to observe a white light traveling eastwards across the airfield. The light appeared to manoeuvre and a brief radar contact was confirmed before the men saw a dark object descend steeply at the end of Runway 26. The object proceeded to cross the airfield at a moderate speed and at a height of a few tens of feet; through binoculars, it appeared to be around 15–20 feet (4.6–6.1 m) tall, vertically elongated and egg-shaped, with a single white light in its base. It came to within 3,000 feet (910 m) of the tower before hovering for a period of up to a minute; it then moved eastwards to the base boundary before suddenly climbing at high speed into the overcast. Kaser and Brink called the Albuquerque Radar Approach Control unit, who confirmed a target moving eastwards in the expected area. It turned south, moving (according to Kaser) at a very high speed, before orbiting in the vicinity of the Albuquerque Low Frequency Range Station for a number of minutes. The target then moved back north towards Kirtland, hovering over the outer marker south of the main north–south runway. It finally took up position half a mile behind a C-46 leaving the base and followed it for around 14 miles (23 km) before again hovering over the outer marker and fading. The total period of radar contact lasted around 20 minutes.

== Investigation for Blue Book; possible solution ==
The witnesses were interviewed a few days later by a Capt. Shere from Ent AFB. Shere was of the opinion that while the two tower operators - who were characterised as completely reliable, competent, and somewhat embarrassed at their report - had genuinely seen something, the object did not display any performance capabilities beyond those to be expected of an ordinary private aircraft, and as there was no other obvious explanation, concluded that they had most likely seen such an aircraft. The radar returns were, it was noted, identical to those of a small plane, strengthening this view. Shere surmised that the aircraft's pilot had mistakenly tried to land at Kirtland before realising his error and hurriedly leaving, after executing a turn which may have been partly obscured by buildings. The case was filed with the conclusion "Possible Aircraft".

This explanation was also used in the final report of the Condon Committee on UFOs, which agreed with the Air Force that "a small, powerful private aircraft, flying without flight plan, [...] became confused and attempted a landing at the wrong airport".

The sighting was investigated by the Air Force for Project Blue Book. The witnesses were traced and again interviewed in the late 1960s by James E. McDonald, an atmospheric physicist and ufologist. McDonald confronted them with the findings of the Blue Book investigation and Condon's final report. Both witnesses claimed that the conclusions offered were "amusing".
