= W67 =

W67 may refer to:

- W67 (nuclear warhead)
- Nukanan Station, in Hokkaido, Japan
- Paul Robinson Observatory
- Plaubel Makina W67, a medium-format camera
- Tetrahemihexahedron
