= LGM-35 Sentinel =

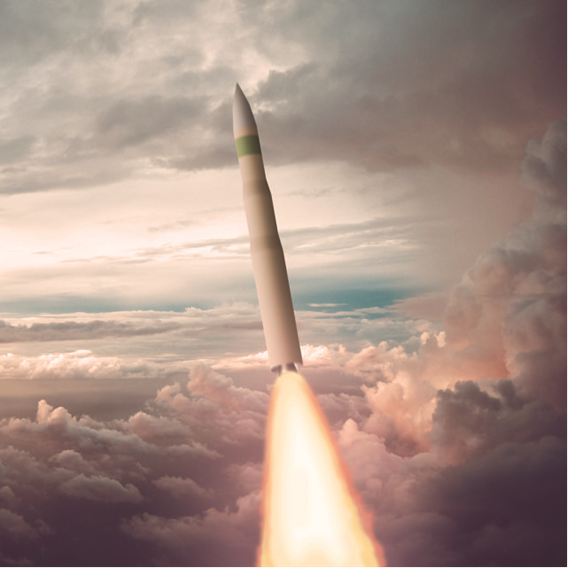
- Concept rendering of the LGM-35A
- Type: Intercontinental ballistic missile
- Place of origin: United States

Service history
- In service: Early 2030s
- Used by: United States

Production history
- Manufacturer: Northrop Grumman

Specifications
- Warhead: Mk-21 RV/W87-0 (300 kt); Mk-21A RV/W87-1 (475 kt)
- Detonation mechanism: Ground-burst and/or air-burst fusing modes
- Engine: Three-stage solid-fuel rocket
- Launch platform: Missile silo

The LGM-35 Sentinel, initially known as the Ground Based Strategic Deterrent (GBSD), is a land-based intercontinental ballistic missile (ICBM) system under development for the United States Air Force. Intended to replace all 450 Minuteman III missiles, the program is slated to acquire 659 Sentinels, including 25 for development and testing, to support the deployment of 400 operational missiles through 2075. The program's estimated cost has nearly doubled and the date of the missiles' initial operational capability has slipped from 2029 to the early 2030s.

In 2020, the Department of the Air Force awarded Northrop Grumman a sole-source contract to develop the Sentinel after Boeing withdrew from the bidding process. Subcontractors include Lockheed Martin, General Dynamics, Bechtel, Honeywell, Aerojet Rocketdyne, Parsons, Textron, and others.

In January 2024, the Air Force announced that the estimated cost of the program, initially given as $78 billion, had risen past $125 billion; and that deployment would be delayed by two years. The consequent Nunn–McCurdy review, released in July 2024, increased the estimated cost to $141 billion, nearly twice the initial price.

The Air Force initially planned to update and reuse the 450 Minuteman silos and more than 600 related facilities spread across about 40,000 square miles (100,000 km^{2}) in Colorado, Montana, Nebraska, North Dakota, and Wyoming. But service officials said in 2025 that new silos and facilities would be needed.

== Name ==
According to the United States Air Force website, the L in LGM is the Department of Defense designation for silo-launched; G means surface attack; and "M" stands for guided missile per the 1963 United States Tri-Service rocket and guided missile designation system. The GBSD program had initially been allocated with the designation LGM-182, but for unknown reasons it was changed to the out-of-sequence designation LGM-35. The name "Sentinel" was chosen to evoke the image of "one that stands guard and keeps the watch" according to Air Force Global Strike Command's lead historian.

== History ==
In 2010, the ICBM Coalition, legislators from states that house nuclear missiles, told President Obama they would not support ratification of the New START treaty with Russia unless Obama agreed to revamp the US nuclear triad: nuclear weapons that could be launched from land, sea, and air. In a written statement, President Obama agreed to "modernize or replace" all three legs of the triad.

A request for proposal for development and maintenance of a next-generation nuclear ICBM was made by the US Air Force Nuclear Weapons Center in July 2016. The GBSD would replace the Minuteman III, which was first deployed in 1970, in the land-based portion of the US nuclear triad. The new missiles, to be phased in over a decade from the late 2020s, are estimated over a fifty-year life cycle to cost around $264 billion. Boeing and Northrop Grumman competed for the contract.

In August 2017, the Air Force awarded three-year development contracts to Boeing and Northrop Grumman for $349 million and $329 million, respectively. One of these companies was to be selected to produce a ground-based nuclear ICBM in 2020. The GBSD program was initially expected to enter service in 2029 and remain active until at least 2075.

On 25 July 2019, Boeing announced it would not place a bid for the program, citing Northrop's recent acquisition of Orbital ATK (now Northrop Grumman Innovation Systems), Boeing's supplier of solid rocket motors. Northrop signed an agreement to firewall Boeing's proprietary data after acquiring Orbital ATK. The Air Force subsequently halted funding for the Boeing project, leaving Northrop Grumman as the sole bidder for the contract by October 2019.

In December 2019, it was announced that Northrop Grumman won the competition to build the future ICBM. Northrop won by default, as their bid was the only one left to be considered for the GBSD program. The Air Force said that they would "proceed with an aggressive and effective sole-source negotiation" in reference to Northrop's bid.

On 8 September 2020, the Department of the Air Force awarded Northrop Grumman a $13.3 billion contract to develop the GBSD intercontinental ballistic missile. Work on the GBSD missiles will be done in Roy and Promontory, Utah; Huntsville and Montgomery, Alabama; Colorado Springs, Colorado; Bellevue, Nebraska; San Diego and Woodland Hills, California; Vandenberg Space Force Base, California; Chandler, Arizona; Annapolis Junction, Maryland; and other locations.

In April 2022, the GBSD's official designation was announced: The LGM-35A Sentinel. In April 2023, the USAF formally began seeking vendor information preliminary to issuing a request for proposal (RFP) for the Next-generation reentry vehicle (NGRV).

=== Delays and cost overruns ===
The Program Acquisition Unit Cost (PAUC) rose from an estimated $118 million per missile in 2020 to about $162 million as of December 2023. This increase was primarily due to rising costs in command and control systems and missile silo infrastructure.

Air Force Secretary Frank Kendall, speaking at a Washington, D.C., think tank in November 2023, said that the program had encountered "unknown unknowns" and was due for a "re-baseline", meaning that the program would cost more than Air Force officials had expected it to. He said, "As we get more into the program, as we understand more deeply what we're actually going to have to do, we're finding some things that are going to cost money. There's no question about that."

On January 19, 2024, the USAF announced that the LGM-35A Sentinel program would exceed its original budget estimate of $95.3 billion by at least 37%, pushing the total cost to over $125 billion, and the service entry would be delayed by two years. The cost and schedule overrun was classified as "critical" and triggered a Nunn–McCurdy review. Under Nunn–McCurdy, programs in critical status are presumed terminated unless the Department of Defense certifies that they are essential to national security and that no less costly alternatives exist. Department officials issued that certification, but directed the Air Force to implement cost controls. The review, released in July 2024, increased the estimated cost to $141 billion, nearly twice the initial price.

In July 2025, The New York Times reported that an unexplained transfer of $934 million from the project had gone to retrofit a Qatari jet given to President Trump to temporarily serve as Air Force One before being given to his presidential library after he left office. The confidential nature of the total cost of upgrading the jet and fund transfer from the program sparked controversy. In the summer of 2025, Air Force Secretary Troy Meink told members of Congress that the Air Force was diverting funds from the LGM-35A Sentinel program to pay for that Air Force One work.

In February 2026, the USAF reported that the Sentinel will not achieve initial operational capability until the early 2030s.

== Warhead ==
In March 2019, the W87 Mod 1 (W87-1) thermonuclear warhead was selected for GBSD, replacing the W78 warhead used on the Minuteman III. It was planned for GBSD to deploy in 2028, with W87-0 warheads initially being fitted to the system and W87-1 warheads being fitted from 2030 onward. This affords the Air Force a small amount of flexibility if the W87-1 is delayed.

The completion of the first plutonium pit for the W87-1 was announced in October 2024 by the National Nuclear Security Administration, after a 35-year hiatus.

The Air Force intends to deploy a single warhead on each missile. The Congressional Research Service notes that the high throw-weight of the missile could provide options for it to carry several MIRVs or penetration aids at a future time, if prospective enemies develop credible anti-ballistic missile defenses.

== Testing ==
GBSD testing is expected to take place mainly at Hill Air Force Base in Utah, and at Vandenberg Space Force Base (VSFB) in California, with missile launches from VSFB over the Pacific Ocean. Additional testing is expected to be conducted at the Army's Dugway Proving Ground in Utah and the Ronald Reagan Ballistic Missile Defense Test Site in the Marshall Islands.

On 7 July 2022, a Minotaur II+ rocket launched from Vandenberg TP-01 for a suborbital reentry vehicle (Mk21A reentry vehicle belonging to AFNWC) demonstration mission for the future LGM-35A Sentinel intercontinental ballistic missile.

== Debate ==
=== Support ===
Supporters of the GBSD include the Heritage Foundation, former secretary of defense Lloyd Austin, former secretary of defense Ash Carter, and members of Congress in the "ICBM Coalition". They argue that the ICBMs first introduced in the 1970s have had their life extended long enough and need to be replaced with a modular system in which components are easier to replace or update. In defending the importance of land-based missiles, supporters say they are the least expensive leg of the nuclear triad because they do not necessitate large maintenance crews or incur expensive refueling costs, like nuclear-powered submarines. Additionally, they argue land-based missiles are visible reminders that the US can strike back in the event of a nuclear attack, thus making them essential to nuclear deterrence.

In its annual 2021 Threat Assessment, the US Intelligence Community said China was planning to double its arsenal of nuclear weapons over the next ten years in "the most rapid expansion in its history". It also warned that Russia may expand and modernize its nuclear arsenal.

One of the main supporters of the GBSD is Senator Jon Tester (D-MT), Chair of the Senate Appropriations Subcommittee on Defense. In a March 21, 2021, interview with Defense News, Tester said, "As of right now, I think it's important that we move forward with the GBSD because I believe there's still an important deterrent." Jennifer Granholm, Secretary of Energy in the Biden administration, told the press on April 9, 2021, "We have to keep and maintain the stockpile to make sure that it is safe and effective, and we will continue to do that to ensure that we can deter nuclear aggression from other countries."

=== Criticism ===
GBSD critics include former secretary of defense William Perry; the late Daniel Ellsberg, Pentagon Papers whistleblower and author of The Doomsday Machine: Confessions of a Nuclear War Planner; the Friends Committee on National Legislation (FCNL); the Union of Concerned Scientists (UCS); the Federation of American Scientists (FAS); and Peace Action. They argue that the new missiles would be not only costly, but also dangerous, increasing the risk of accidentally launching a nuclear war. Critics say that the targeting of ICBM silos, which are supposed to act like a sponge drawing nuclear weapons to deplete Russia's nuclear power, could result in the deaths of more than 10 million people. Ellsberg and author Norman Solomon argue that peace groups must oppose not only the GBSD but also the entire land-based leg of the nuclear triad to reduce the threat of an accidental nuclear war.

Physicist David Wright, former co-director of the UCS Global Security Program, in his report Rethinking Land-Based Nuclear Missiles, writes that submarine-launched ballistic missiles (SLBMs) are as accurate, if not more, than land-based missiles, and are "virtually undetectable," making the ICBMs not only obsolete but also sitting ducks in the five states that house ICBMs. Wright concludes that the vulnerability of ICBMs has prompted the Air Force to keep them on high alert, which is dangerous and could trigger a nuclear war. According to William Hartung, author of Prophets of War: Lockheed Martin and the Making of the Military-Industrial Complex, a president would have only minutes to decide whether to launch ICBMs in a crisis so that the missiles would not be destroyed in a first strike.

In FAS' 2026 report on US nuclear weapons, they argued the Sentinel program does nothing to address the primary existing problems of land-based ICBMs, including the launch-on-warning posture, the danger of missiles triggering nuclear retaliation from a country whose territory they fly over (e.g. Russia), while en route to their true target (e.g. China, North Korea, Iran), silo weaknesses during environmental catastrophes or to conventional weapons attacks. They argued that the Air Force has yet to explain why the Sentinel will have a greater range, given it is unlikely to have the necessary range to avoid such overflights. They argued US adversaries have no boost-phase intercept capabilities, therefore ICBM reliability depends entirely on the payload, e.g., its penetration aids.

== Polling ==
In 2020, the Program for Public Consultation at the University of Maryland, issued a report entitled Common Ground of the American People, which was a compilation of studies conducted over the previous five years, collecting data from nearly 86,000 individuals who were polled on the GBSD. Sixty-one percent of Americans–including both Democratic and Republican majorities–said they supported phasing out the United States' 400 land-based intercontinental ballistic missiles.

Another 2020 poll conducted by the Federation of American Scientists and ReThink Media found a majority of both Republicans and Democrats favored alternative solutions to the GBSD, including extending the life of the Minuteman III ICBM. Over 800 registered voters were surveyed, with an oversampling of 200 registered voters in ICBM states: Colorado, Montana, North Dakota, Nebraska and Wyoming. When respondents were asked, "What do you think the government should do about ICBMs?", 30 percent favored updating existing ICBMs rather than replacing them, 26 percent supported the GBSD, 20 percent preferred eliminating the ICBMs and 10 percent supported abolishing all nuclear weapons.

According to a 2021 survey commissioned by the Mitchell Institute for Aerospace Studies, an organization funded by the top weapons manufacturers, the majority of voters believe that nuclear deterrence capability should be one of the highest priorities for the Department of Defense, with a majority also supporting modernization efforts. The survey asked more than 2,000 voters for their views on national security and nuclear arms. Eighty-one percent of survey respondents preferred the security benefits of the United States' ground-based nuclear capabilities more than the cost savings of removing these capabilities. When told the Minuteman III ICBM system is over 50 years old, the majority of respondents said the ICBMs should be replaced by a modern system, compared to 23 percent who said the ICBMs should be refurbished to extend their life. Just five percent indicated an opinion that they should be eliminated entirely. When informed that Russia and China have modernized their nuclear arsenals, support for replacing Minuteman III with a modern ICBM system rose to 65 percent, compared to only 15 percent in favor of refurbishing.

== ICBM Coalition ==
The ICBM Coalition in Congress, which lobbies for the GBSD, was able to limit the reduction of deployed land-based missiles to 50 in the New Strategic Arms Reduction Treaty (New START). As of May 2021, membership in the coalition included senators from states that will either house or develop the proposed GBSD missiles: Co-Chair, Sen. John Hoeven (R-ND); Co-Chair, Sen. Jon Tester (D-MT); Sen. John Barrasso (R-WY); Sen. Steve Daines (R-MT); Sen. Mike Lee (R-UT); Sen. Mike Rounds (R-SD).

Tester serves as Chair of the Senate Appropriations defense subcommittee. During a spring 2021 event hosted by the Washington, D.C.–based Advanced Nuclear Weapons Alliance, Tester said he was committed to keeping the GBSD "on track" though added there will be debate about the proposed new missiles during the 2022 defense appropriations process.

According to the Arms Control Association, Caucus Senators received the following contributions from military contractors from 2012 to 2020: Romney ($645,000); Tester ($102,360); Barrasso ($89,000); Daines ($85,948); Enzi ($68,500); Cramer ($49,593). In total, military contractors have donated $1.2 million to the members of the Senate ICBM Coalition and more than $15 million to the 64 members of the influential committees, the Senate and House Armed Services strategic forces subcommittees and the Senate and House Appropriations defense subcommittees, that can decide the fate of ICBM legislation. ICBM contractors are also engaged in lobbying representatives in Congress, with corporate backers of GBSD employing 380 lobbyists, according to the Arms Control Association.

== See also ==
- Columbia-class submarine, a SSBN also scheduled to enter service around 2031 to replace the aging Ohio-class submarine.
- Northrop Grumman B-21 Raider, a nuclear capable, long-range, stealth strategic bomber entering service in the 2020s.

=== Similar weapons ===
- Agni-VI (India, under development)
- DF-41 (China, 2017)
- RS-24 Yars (Russia, 2011)
