= W62 =

American thermonuclear warhead designed in the late 1960s

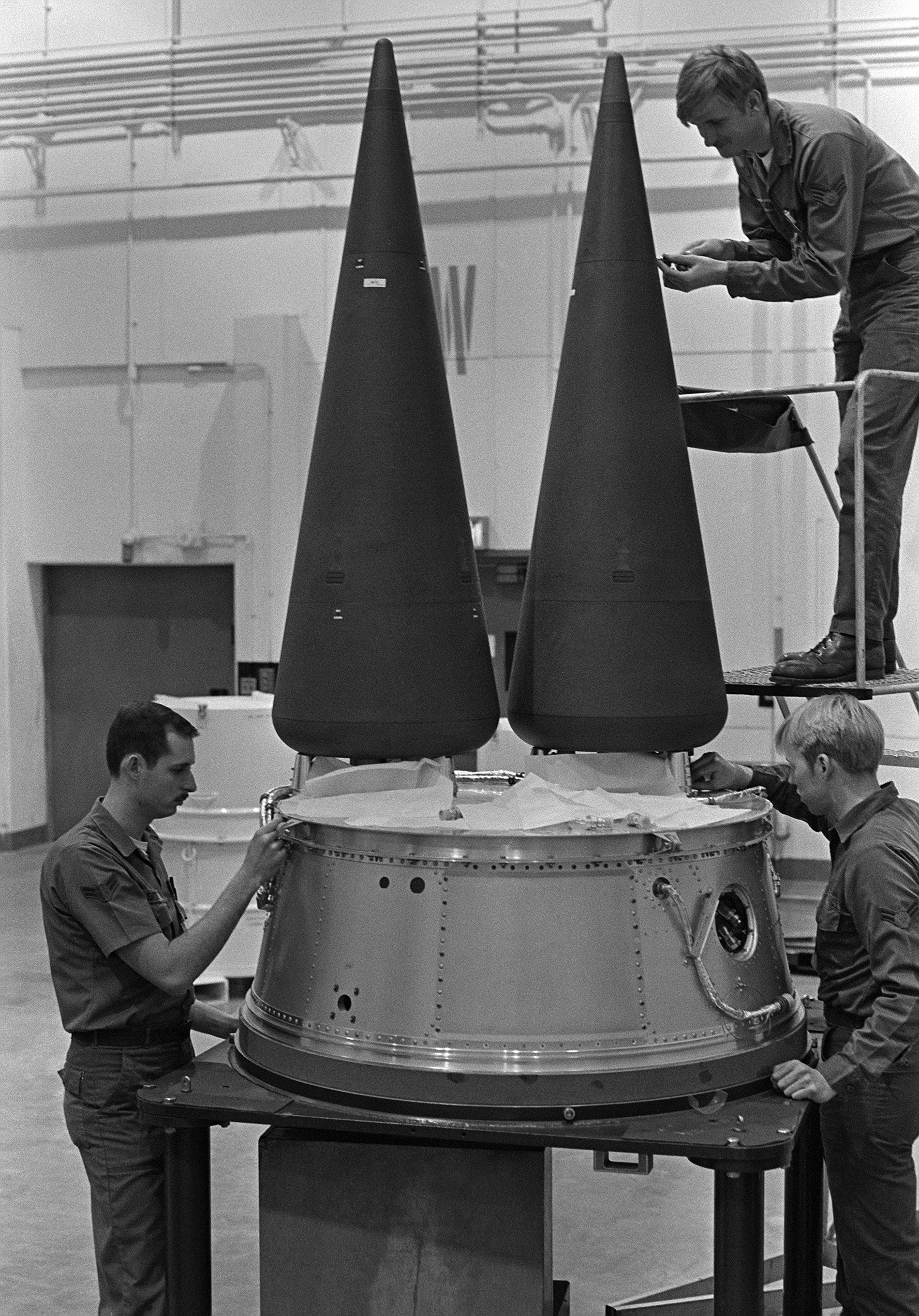
- Airmen work on the W62 warheads of an LGM-30G Minuteman III’s Multiple Independently-targetable Re-entry Vehicle (MIRV) system.
- Type: Nuclear warhead

Service history
- In service: 1970–2010
- Used by: United States

Production history
- Designer: Lawrence Livermore National Laboratory
- Designed: 1963–1968
- Produced: March 1970 to June 1976
- No. built: 1725

Specifications
- Mass: RV: 350 lb (160 kg); WH: 253 lb (115 kg)
- Detonation mechanism: Contact, airburst
- Blast yield: 170 kilotonnes of TNT (710 TJ)

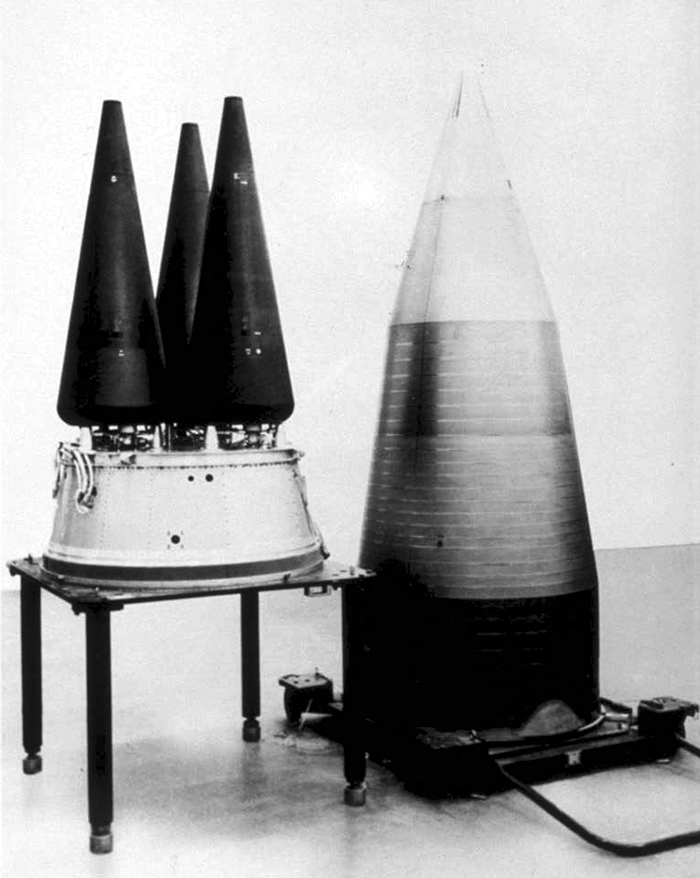
W62 warheads are contained inside the Mark 12 reentry vehicles of the LGM-30G Minuteman III.

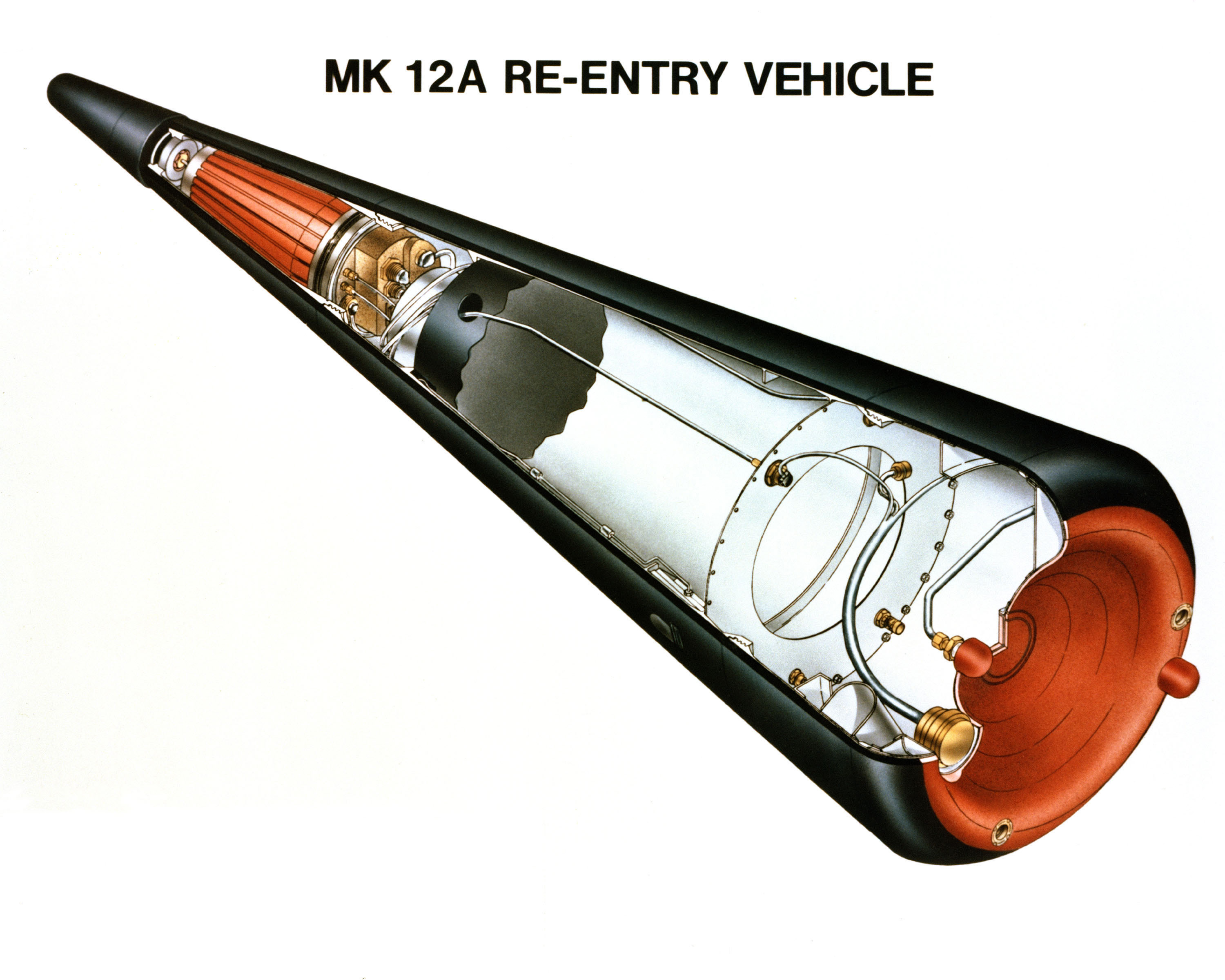
Drawing of the Mark 12 re-entry vehicle that houses the W62 warhead.

The W62 was an American thermonuclear warhead designed in the 1960s and manufactured from March 1970 to June 1976. Used on some Minuteman III ICBMs, it was partially replaced by the W78 starting in December 1979, and fully replaced by W87 warheads removed from MX Peacekeeper missiles and retired in 2010.

== History ==
The concept of the W62 began in 1961 with an air force study into reentry vehicles for "multiple mode", what Multiple Reentry Vehicles (MRV) was then called. The study proposed a Mark 12 RV for Minuteman, a Mark 13 RV for Titan II and a Mark 14 RV for Titan I and Atlas. The primary goal of these new RVs was to overcome terminal anti-ballistic missile defenses. One of the earliest effects tests of this new RV was shot Marshmallow of Operation Nougat in 1962. In August 1962 the Mark 12 RV developed into the twin-RV concept, consisting of two different reentry vehicles: a "light" and "heavy", both called the Mark 12.

In January 1963, development of a MRV system for Minuteman was authorized. At this time, the navy asked to become an observer for the program. In April 1963, the system feasibility study was released. Three warhead designs of varying hardness, yield and weight were proposed for the light warhead, and two for the heavy warhead.

The concept of multiple independent reentry vehicles (MIRV) was developed in late 1962 and early 1963. Several independent inventors are credited with the idea, with the technological concept originating in the Able-Star and Trantstage systems. Able-Star was a system for the Thor rocket that allowed for the deployment of multiple satellites from a single rocket into multiple orbits. Transtage was a highly maneuverable post-boost control system developed without any specific mission in mind, but was used for the IDCSP defense communication satellite system. Further developments included the miniaturization of thermonuclear weapons.

In October 1963, the director for defense research requested that the air force and navy cooperate on the Mark 12 program so that the warhead could be used interchangeably on both the Minuteman and Polaris missiles. The immediate effect was for the air force and navy to adopt common vulnerability requirement for the warhead, which was complicated by the navy having more stringent vulnerability requirements than the air force.

In 1964, the heavy warhead was spun off as the Mark 17 warhead, which became the W67 warhead, and in March, there were further investigations into even lighter warheads than the baseline Mark 12 light design. The initial secondary stage in the warhead was of the "conventional design", but in July the design was changed to allow for more forward placing of the warhead, reducing total weight. The first test of the secondary was in September. In November, the system specifications were changed to support development of an MIRV system.

A series of changes were made to the weapon requirements in regards to hardening in 1964 and 1965. This included a second weapon effects test, Gumdrop of Operation Whetstone 21 April 1965. These led to changes in the primary stage design in March 1965. In 1966, significant effort was devoted towards hardening the warhead systems against weapon effects to prevent x-ray pin-down. (Note: X-ray pin-down is where warheads are detonated high above an ICBM silo field, in the missile's flyout corridor, to destroy ascending ICBMs. When detonated exoatmospherically, the primary effects from the detonations are x-rays which cause lethal damage to the ascending ICBMs in a very wide radius.) In the same year, the warhead was delayed due to RV ablation causing some RVs to break up on reentry.

In October 1967, navy cooperation on the Mark 12 was terminated, as the need to make the warhead compatible with both air force and navy requirements ultimately lead to a weapon that was less suitable for either application.

The first production W62 was produced in April 1970. The warhead was partially replaced by the W78 starting in December 1979 and fully replaced by the W87 warhead in 2010, thereafter it was retired and dismantled.

== Design ==
The exact dimensions of the W62 are classified, but it fits within the Mark 12 reentry vehicle which is 22 in (56 cm) in diameter and 72 in (1.8 m) long. The weight of the W62 has been described as both 253 lb (115 kg) and 700 to 800 lb (320 to 360 kg), however a declassified document circa 1963 states that the combined weight of the warheads in the three warhead configuration for Minuteman would be approximately 750 lb (340 kg) or 250 lb (110 kg) per warhead.

The H1224A and H1501A-1 containers have an inner diameter of 20 in (51 cm). Here is a diagram showing that the diameter of the reentry vehicle is no more than 50.8 cm.

The yield of the W62 is publicly believed to be 170 kilotonnes of TNT (710 TJ). The W56 warhead on Minuteman III's predecessor had a yield of 1.2 megatonnes of TNT (5.0 PJ), while its successor, the W78, has a yield of 330 to 350 kilotonnes of TNT (1,400 to 1,500 TJ). The weapon had contact and airburst fuzing modes. Development of the warhead required "numerous" nuclear tests between 1963 and 1968. Some of these tests were to develop the primary and for one-point safety testing of the system.

Two or three warheads were carried on Minuteman III, depending on the desired maximum range. Proposals to put the W62 on Titan II were to use two warhead buses, carrying eight warheads each, for a total of sixteen warheads.

A total of 1,725 W62 warheads were produced during its production run. The last W62 was dismantled in August 2010.

== See also ==
- W78
- W87
- List of nuclear weapons
