= W67 (nuclear warhead) =

- Type: Thermonuclear warhead

Service history
- Used by: United States

Production history
- Designer: Los Alamos National Laboratory

Specifications
- Mass: 900–938 pounds (408–425 kg)
- Detonation mechanism: Contact, airburst
- Blast yield: 1500 kt

The W67 was an American thermonuclear warhead developed from June 1966 but then cancelled prior to any production or service use approximately 18 months later.

Developed by Los Alamos, the warhead was in the megaton range and was to have a yield comparable to that of the W56. It was housed in the Mark 17 reentry vehicle and one of the warhead's design goals was the highest maximum output temperature possible. Only one partial yield test of the warhead was performed before the warhead was cancelled in January 1968. Hansen identifies this test as Crosstie Zara.

The Mark 17 RV had a difficult development. The planned total RV and warhead weight was 900 pounds (410 kg), but by November 1966 it weighed 938 pounds (425 kg) due to the higher than anticipated levels of hostile weapons effects protection needed. The actual warhead weight was 675 pounds (306 kg).

After its cancellation, the W68 warhead was developed for Poseidon and the W62 warhead for Minuteman III.

The W67 was briefly revived in 1970 for the CAFE (C-3 Alternative Front End) program for Poseidon. CAFE was a contingency program for in the event that MIRV warheads were banned and Poseidon needed to be fitted with a single warhead. Two W67 designs were examined and would use the Mark 1 Prime reentry body. Total warhead weight was 680 pounds (310 kg).

== See also ==
- List of nuclear weapons
- LGM-30 Minuteman
- UGM-73 Poseidon
