= W87 =

American thermonuclear missile warhead

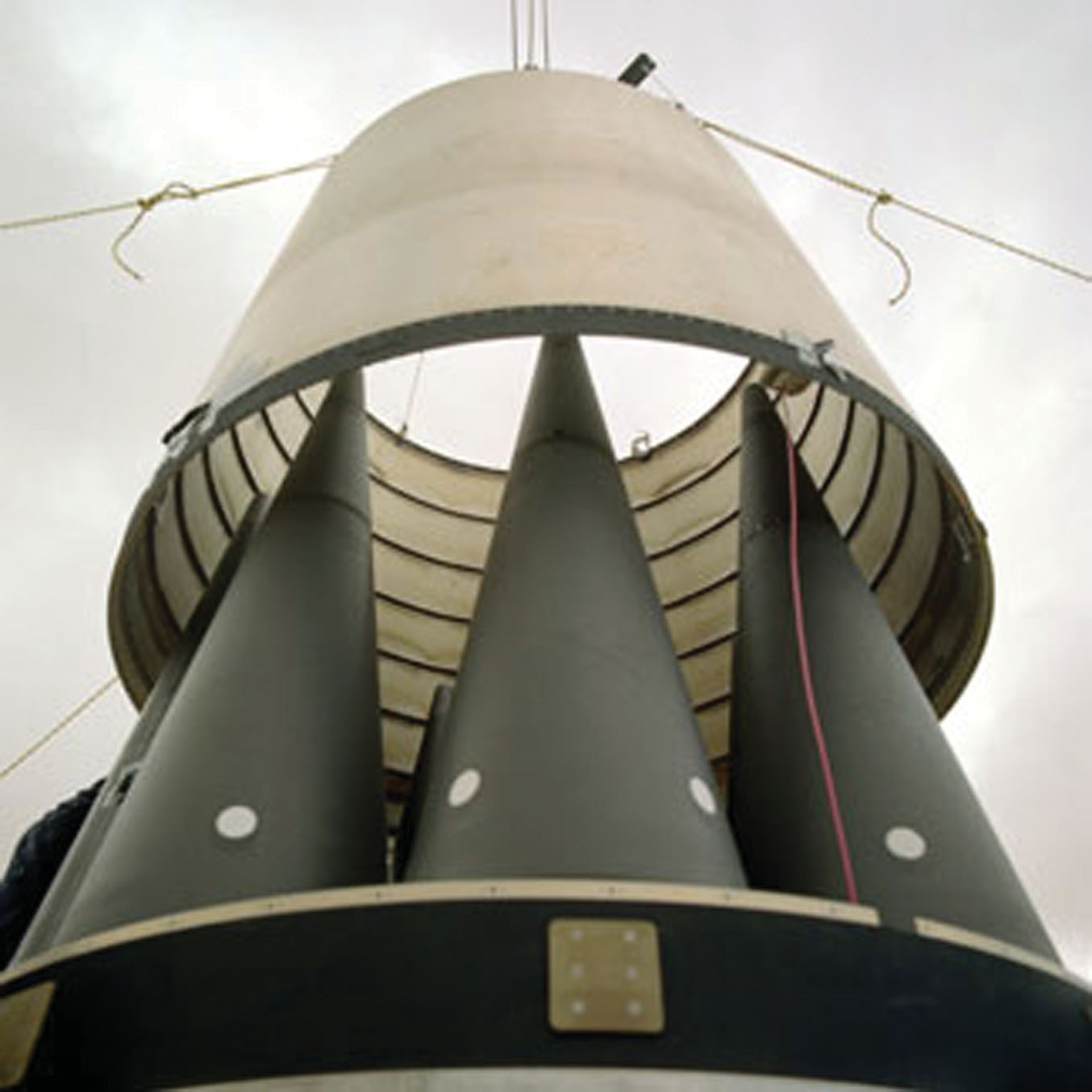
- The Mark 21 reentry vehicles shown here for the LGM-118A Peacekeeper contain W87 warheads.
- Type: Thermonuclear warhead

Service history
- In service: 1986–present
- Used by: United States

Production history
- Designer: Lawrence Livermore National Laboratory
- Designed: Mod 0: February 1982; Mod 1: November 1986 to July 1988, March 2019 to 2030
- Produced: Mod 0: July 1986 to December 1988; Mod 1: 2030 onwards
- No. built: 525
- Variants: 2

Specifications
- Mass: 200 kilograms (440 lb)
- Detonation mechanism: Contact, airburst
- Blast yield: 300 kt (W87-0); 475 kt (W87-1)

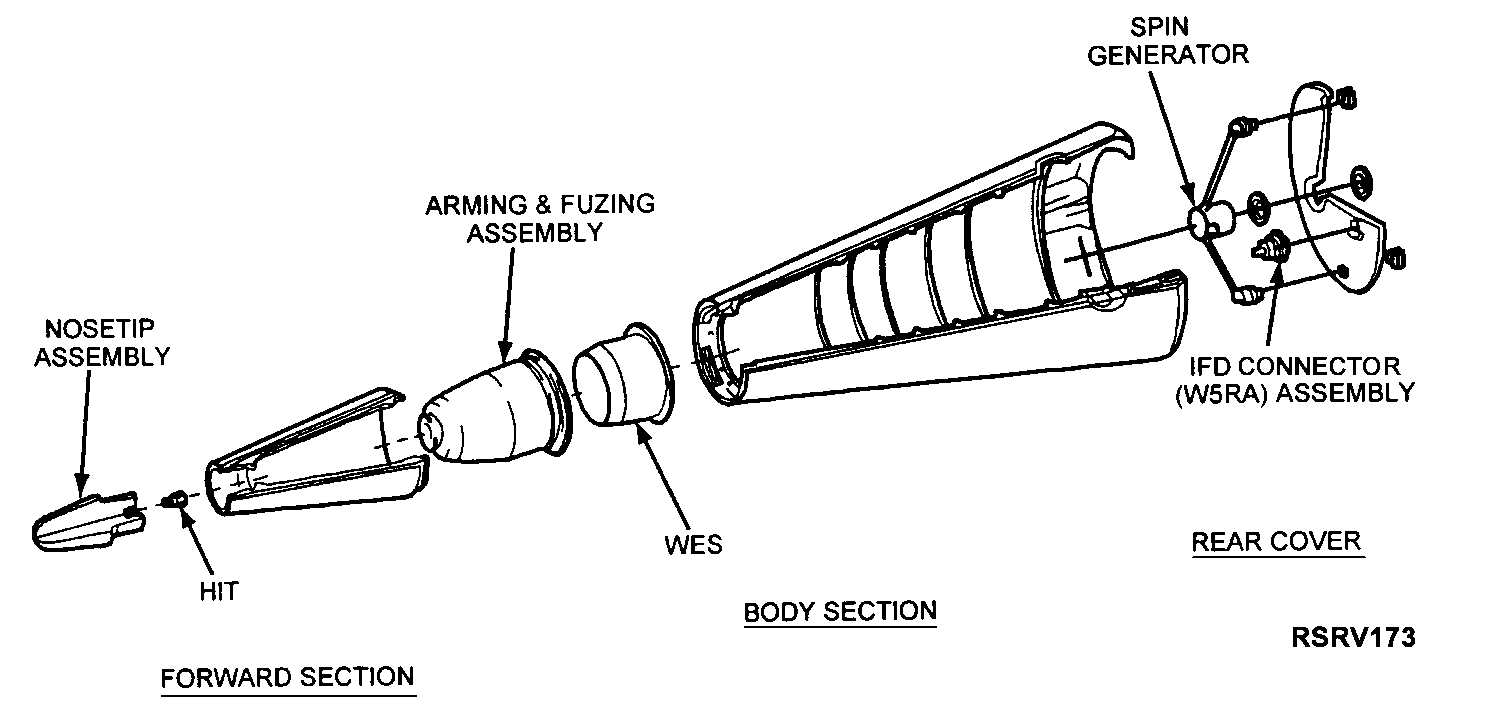
Exploded diagram of the Mark 21 reentry vehicle for the W87

The W87 is an American thermonuclear missile warhead formerly deployed on the LGM-118A Peacekeeper ("MX") ICBM. Fifty MX missiles were built, each carrying up to 10 W87 warheads in multiple independently targetable reentry vehicles (MIRV), and were deployed from 1986 to 2005. Starting in 2007, 250 of the W87 warheads from retired Peacekeeper missiles were retrofitted onto much older Minuteman III missiles, with one warhead per missile. An upgraded version is planned for use on the forthcoming LGM-35A Sentinel ICBM.

== Description ==
The W87 warhead. The secondary (top) is forward of the larger primary (bottom).

Design of the W87 (now called the W87 Mod 0 or W87-0) started in February 1982 at Lawrence Livermore National Laboratory and production of the warhead began in July 1986 and ended in December 1988. Its design is reportedly somewhat similar to the W88, though that warhead was designed at Los Alamos National Laboratory. The weapons are part of a National Nuclear Security Administration nuclear weapons lifecycle program.

The W87 design includes all modern safety features, including the insensitive high explosives LX-17 and PBX-9502 (primary component TATB), a fire-resistant pit, and advanced arming and fuzing safety features.

The original yield of the W87 was 300 kilotons, but it has the announced ability to be upgraded to a yield of 475 kilotons, presumably by using more highly enriched uranium (HEU) in the fusion secondary stage tamper. It is not known if that upgrade was completely tested and ready to implement, or merely designed.

The exact dimensions of the W87 are classified, but it fits inside the Mark 21 reentry vehicle, which is a cone with base diameter of 21.8 inches (55 cm) and a length of 68.9 inches (175 cm). The weight has been estimated to be either 200 kilograms (440 lb), or between 200 and 270 kilograms (440 and 600 lb).

The Mark 21 reentry vehicle is stored and transported in an H1473 container.

== W87 mod 1 ==
In addition to the higher yield upgrade option described above, a specific variant W87 mod 1 (W87-1) entered Phase 3 development engineering and was assigned its type designation in November 1988. This variant was intended for the MGM-134 Midgetman small ICBM missile and was intended to have the full 475 kiloton yield. The W87-1 had a planned first production unit date of July 1997, but Midgetman and W87-1 were canceled in January 1992.

In 2019, the W87 mod 1 was selected to replace the W78 warhead deployed on all Minuteman III missiles not currently carrying the W87 mod 0. The new warhead will not be deployed onto Minuteman III, but instead be deployed on Minuteman III's replacement ICBM system LGM-35A Sentinel (formerly Ground Based Strategic Deterrent or GBSD). It is not clear if the new W87 mod 1 program is a continuation of the previous W87 mod 1 program, or if it uses any of the physics package developed in the previous W87 mod 1 program.

Information released by the Department of Energy (DoE) on the program states that it "has a similar primary design to the W87-0", which could be evidence that it is like the previous W87 mod 1 program in that it has a different or modified secondary to produce a higher yield. The DoE states that the weapon is based on previously tested nuclear components, with a primary stage containing insensitive high explosives and advanced safety features, but that the weapon does not provide any new military capabilities.

Phase 6.2 Feasibility Study was halted in 2014 before being restarted in 2019. Phase 6.3 Development Engineering is planned to begin July 2022, with 6.4 Production Engineering planned for mid-2026 and 6.5 Initial Production planned for 2030.

It is planned for the Sentinel missile to deploy in 2028, with W87-0 warheads initially being fitted to the system and W87-1 warheads being fitted from 2030 onward. This affords the Air Force a small amount of flexibility if the W87-1 is delayed.

== See also ==
- W62
- W78
- W88 – another warhead of the same era as the W87, which is commonly thought to share a common secondary design with the W87, and uses a similar reentry vehicle to the W87
- List of nuclear weapons
