= W78 =

American thermonuclear warhead

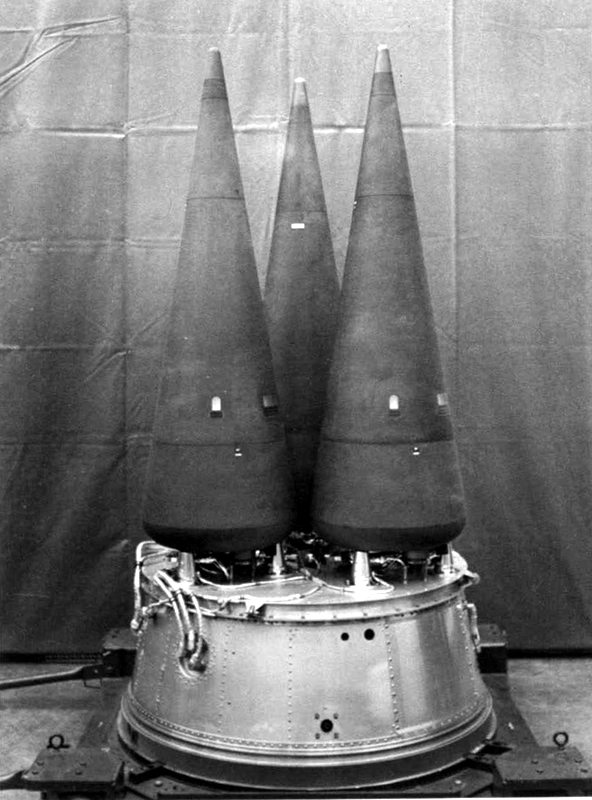
- Mark 12A reentry vehicles mounted on a Minuteman III warhead bus. Each Mark 12A reentry vehicle contains a W78 nuclear warhead.
- Type: Nuclear weapon

Service history
- Used by: United States Air Force

Production history
- Designer: Los Alamos National Laboratory

Specifications
- Detonation mechanism: Contact, airburst
- Blast yield: 335-350 kt

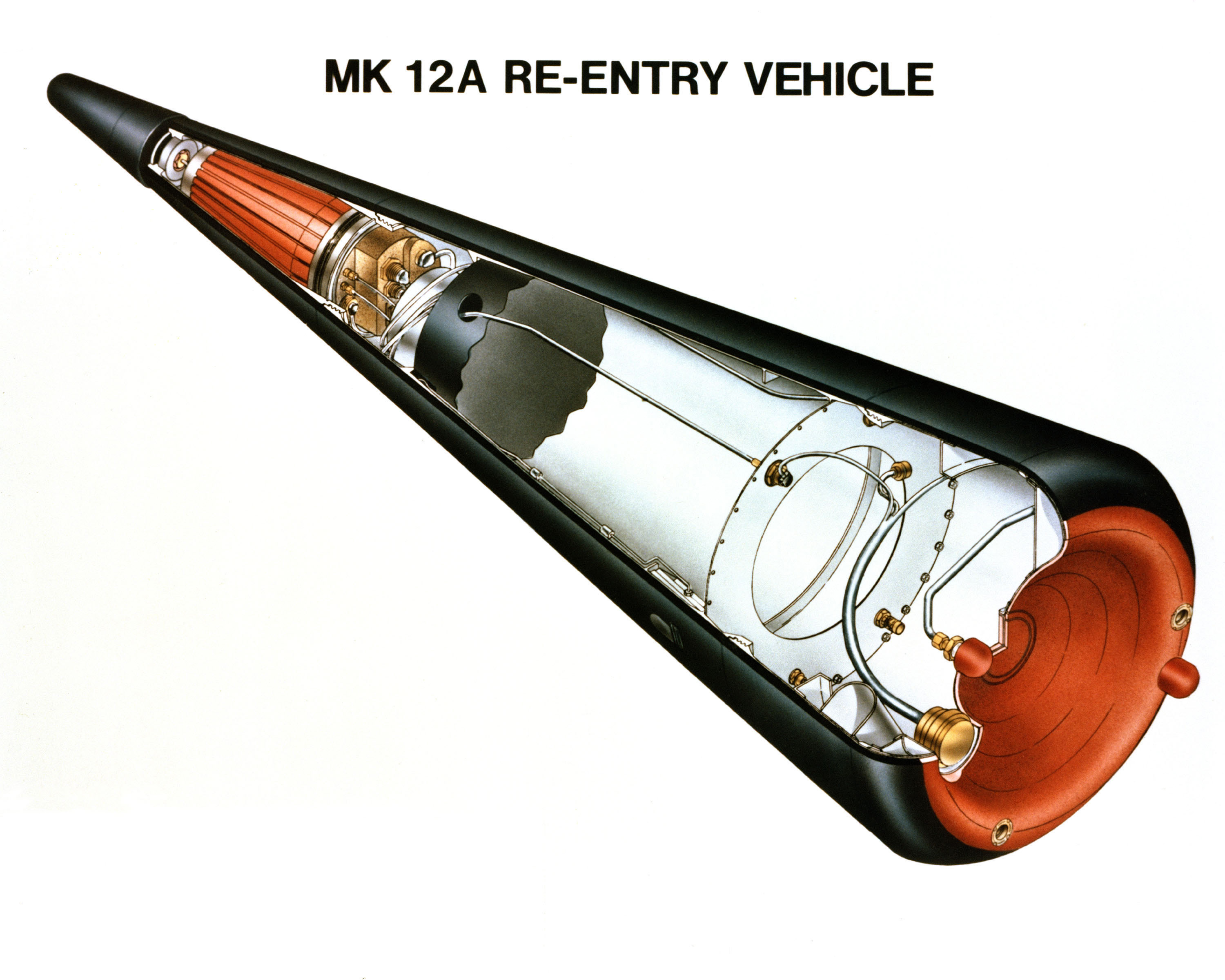
Drawing of the Mark 12A reentry vehicle that houses the W78 warhead.

The W78 is an American thermonuclear warhead with an estimated yield of 335–350 kilotonnes of TNT (1,400–1,460 TJ), deployed on the LGM-30G Minuteman III intercontinental ballistic missile (ICBM) and housed in the Mark 12A reentry vehicle. Minuteman III initially carried the older W62 warhead with a yield of 170 kilotonnes of TNT (710 TJ), but starting in December 1979 and ending in February 1982, some W62 were replaced with the W78. It is publicly estimated that 1083 warheads were manufactured.

== History ==
The W78 was designed at Los Alamos National Laboratory (LANL) starting in 1974. It is thought that the warhead has never been tested at full yield, with the weapon producing a "disappointing" yield shortly before the 1976 Threshold Test Ban Treaty came into force, leading to a redesign of the weapon that was not complete before the treaty came into force. This led to a dispute between LANL and Lawrence Livermore National Laboratory who estimated the weapon's yield below that of LANL. The dispute was resolved by a panel led by former LLNL director John Foster who found in favor of LANL's yield estimate.

The final W62 warhead was not removed from service until March 2010. This leaves the W78 and W87 warheads as the only warheads carried by Minuteman III. Downloading of the Minuteman III missile (reducing the number of warheads carried) was completed in June 2014, reducing the warheads carried by each missile from three to one.

== Design ==
Dimensions of the W78 are unknown, but it fits within the Mark 12A reentry vehicle which is conically shaped. The RV is 21.3 inches (54 cm) in diameter at its base and 71.3 inches (181 cm) long, and total warhead and reentry vehicle weight is estimated to be 700 to 800 pounds (320 to 360 kg).

The H1224A and H1501A-1 containers have an inner diameter of 20 in (51 cm). Here is a diagram showing that the diameter of the reentry vehicle is no more than 50.8 cm.

It is speculated that the weapon combines the secondary (fusion) stage design of an older warhead such as the W50, with a more modern primary stage.

== See also ==
- W62
- W87
- List of nuclear weapons
