= LGM-30 Minuteman =

American ICBM

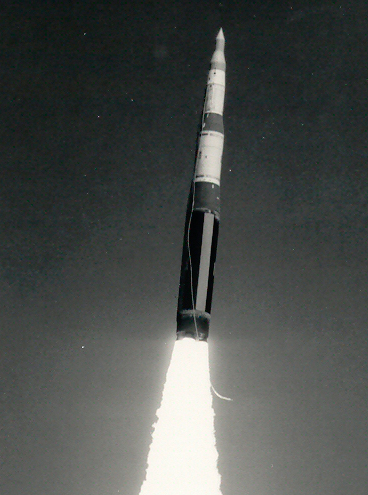
- Minuteman II
- Type: Intercontinental ballistic missile
- Place of origin: United States

Service history
- In service: Minuteman I: 1962–1969; Minuteman II: 1965–1994; Minuteman III: 1970–present
- Used by: United States Air Force

Production history
- Manufacturer: Boeing
- Unit cost: US$7,000,000 (equivalent to $34,600,000 in 2025)
- No. built: 550

Specifications
- Mass: Minuteman I: About 65,000 lb (29,000 kg); Minuteman II: About 73,000 lb (33,000 kg); Minuteman III: 79,432 lb (36,030 kg)
- Length: Minuteman I/A: 53 ft 8 in (16.36 m); Minuteman I/B: 55 ft 11 in (17.04 m); Minuteman II: 57 ft 7 in (17.55 m); Minuteman III: 59.9 ft (18.3 m)
- Diameter: 5 ft 6 in (1.68 m) (1st stage)
- Warhead: Minuteman I: W59 (retired); Minuteman I and II: W56 (retired); Minuteman III: 2–3 × W62 (retired), 2–3 × W78 (retired), 1 × W78 (active), or 1 × W87 (active)
- Detonation mechanism: Air-burst or contact (surface)
- Engine: Three-stage solid-fuel rocket engines: First stage: Thiokol TU-122 (M-55) (178,000 lbf, 790 kN); Second stage: Aerojet-General SR-19-AJ-1 (60,181 lbf, 267.70 kN); Third stage: Aerojet/Thiokol SR73-AJ/TC-1 (34,170 lbf, 152.0 kN); First stage 202,600 lb (91,900 kg) (Minuteman III)
- Propellant: Ammonium perchlorate composite propellant
- Operational range: Minuteman I: 5,500 nmi (6,300 mi; 10,200 km); Minuteman II: 6,300 nmi (7,200 mi; 11,700 km); Minuteman III: 7,600 nmi (8,700 mi; 14,000 km)
- Flight ceiling: 1,120 km (3,670,000 ft; 700 mi)
- Maximum speed: Mach 23 (17,500 mph; 28,200 km/h; 7.83 km/s) (terminal phase)
- Guidance system: Inertial NS-50
- Accuracy: Minuteman I: 1.1 nmi (2.0 km) CEP initially, then 0.6 nmi (1.1 km) CEP; Minuteman II: 0.26 nmi (0.48 km) CEP; Minuteman III: 200 m (660 ft) CEP
- Launch platform: Missile silo

Minuteman III launch from Vandenberg Space Force Base in California on 9 February 2023.

The LGM-30 Minuteman is an American land-based intercontinental ballistic missile (ICBM) in service with the Air Force Global Strike Command. As of 2025, the LGM-30G (Version 3) (Note: The letter "L" in "LGM" indicates that the missile is silo-launched; the "G" indicates that it is designed to attack ground targets; the "M" indicates that it is a guided missile.) is the only land-based ICBM in service in the United States and represents the land leg of the U.S. nuclear triad, along with the Trident II submarine-launched ballistic missile (SLBM) and nuclear weapons carried by long-range strategic bombers.

Development of the Minuteman began in the mid-1950s when basic research indicated that a solid-fuel rocket motor could stand ready to launch for long periods of time, in contrast to liquid-fueled rockets that required fueling before launch and so might be destroyed in a surprise attack. The missile was named for the colonial minutemen of the American Revolutionary War, who could be ready to fight on short notice.

The Minuteman entered service in 1962 as a deterrence weapon that could hit Soviet cities with a second strike and countervalue counterattack if the U.S. was attacked. However, the development of the United States Navy (USN) UGM-27 Polaris, which addressed the same role, allowed the Air Force to modify the Minuteman, boosting its accuracy enough to attack hardened military targets, including Soviet missile silos. The Minuteman II entered service in 1965 with a host of upgrades to improve its accuracy and survivability in the face of an anti-ballistic missile (ABM) system the Soviets were known to be developing. In 1970, the Minuteman III became the first deployed ICBM with multiple independently targetable reentry vehicles (MIRV): three smaller warheads that improved the missile's ability to strike targets defended by ABMs. However, the Minutemen III missiles were later "de-MIRVed"; since 2016 they have had only a single warhead per missile, either a W78 (335 kT) or W87 (300 kT).

By the 1970s, 1,000 Minuteman missiles were deployed. This force had shrunk to 400 Minuteman III missiles as of September 2017, deployed in missile silos around Malmstrom AFB, Montana; Minot AFB, North Dakota; and Francis E. Warren AFB, Wyoming. The Minuteman III will be progressively replaced by the new LGM-35 Sentinel ICBM, to be built by Northrop Grumman, beginning in 2030.

== History ==
=== Edward Hall and solid fuels ===
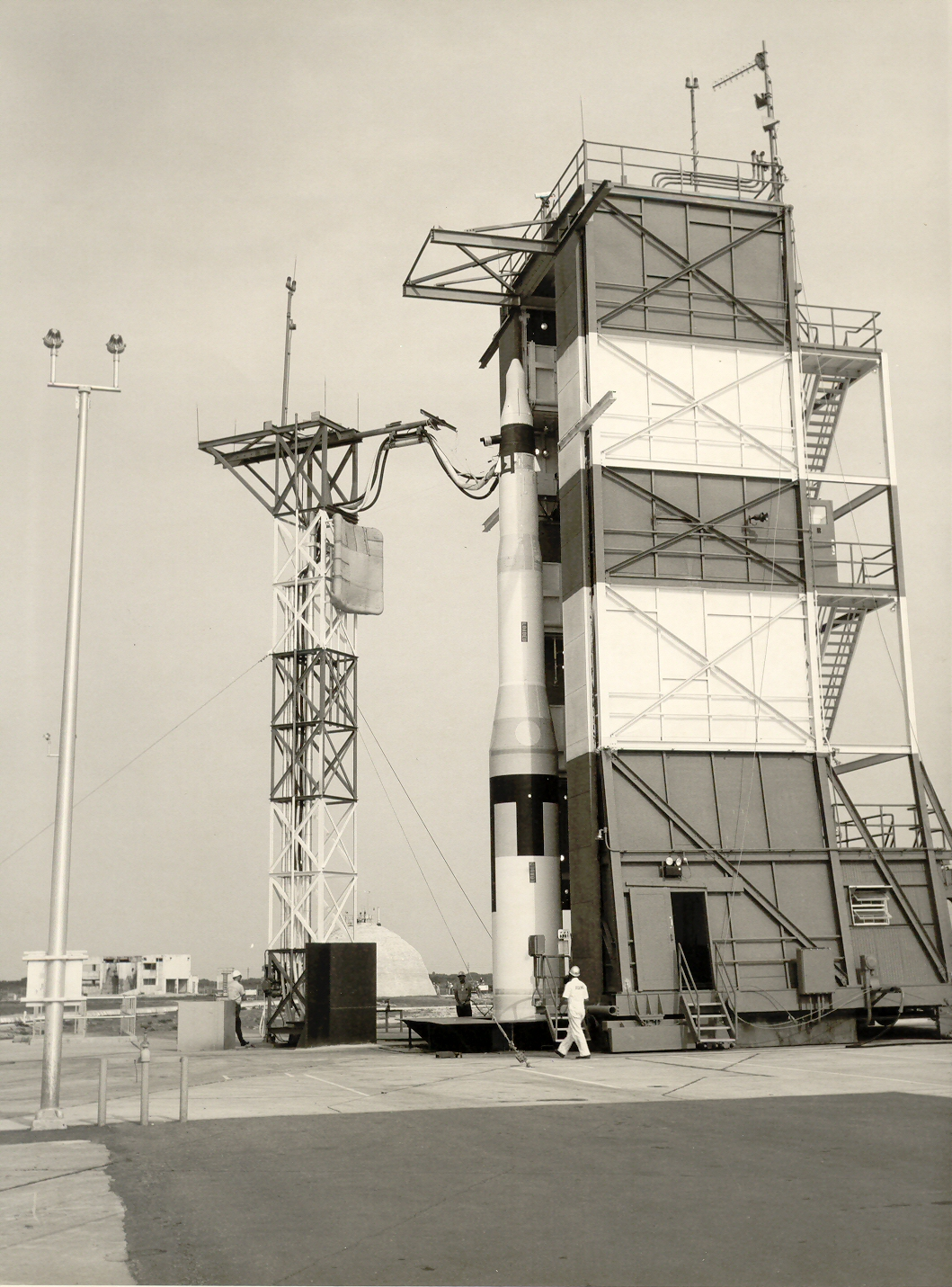
Minuteman I missile

Minuteman owes its existence largely to Air Force Colonel Edward N. Hall, who in 1956 was given charge of the solid-fuel-propulsion division of General Bernard Schriever's Western Development Division, which was originally created to lead development of the SM-65 Atlas and HGM-25A Titan I ICBMs. Solid fuels were already commonly used in short-range rockets. Hall's superiors were interested in short- and medium-range missiles with solids, especially for use in Europe where the fast reaction time was an advantage for weapons that might be attacked by Soviet aircraft. But Hall was convinced that they could be used for a true ICBM with a 5,500-nautical-mile (10,200 km; 6,300 mi) range.

To achieve the required energy, that year Hall began funding research at Boeing and Thiokol into the use of ammonium perchlorate composite propellant. Adapting a concept developed in the UK during the war for the RP-3 rocket. Initially these had a cylindrical motor with a long hole down the middle for the flame. Later versions used a cross-shaped hole instead. This offered very high initial thrust as the burning was initially on all of the open areas of the hole, but as the fuel burned off it did so primarily in the center, and eventually became a cylinder that had a slower burning rate more suitable for cruising. Using this same concept, modern missies had adapted more complex shapes to tailor the thrust profile. This also meant the heat was spread across the entire length of the motor, instead of the end, and because it burned from the inside out it did not reach the wall of the missile fuselage until the fuel was finished burning. In comparison, older designs burned primarily from one end to the other, meaning that at any instant one small section of the fuselage was being subjected to extreme loads and temperatures and had to be very strong.

Guidance of an ICBM is based not only on the direction the missile is traveling but the precise instant that thrust is cut off. Too much thrust and the warhead will overshoot its target, too little and it will fall short. Solids are normally very hard to predict in terms of burn time and their instantaneous thrust during the burn, which made them questionable for the sort of accuracy required to hit a target at intercontinental range. This was the main reason they were only being considered for short-range weapons like Honest John, where this effect was not large enough to put the missile outside its intended target area. But at longer distances, any initial inaccuracy in thrust cutoff would compound over the long flight time and put it well outside its lethal range. While this initially appeared to be an insurmountable problem, it ended up being solved in an almost trivial fashion. A series of ports were added inside the rocket nozzle that were opened when the guidance systems called for engine cut-off. The reduction in pressure was so abrupt that the remaining fuel broke up and blew out the nozzle without contributing to the thrust.

The first to put these developments to use was the US Navy. It had been involved in a joint program with the US Army to develop the liquid-fueled PGM-19 Jupiter, but had always been skeptical of that design. The Navy felt that liquid fuels were too dangerous to use onboard ships, especially submarines, and began a major effort to improve solid fuel engines. Rapid success in the solids development program, combined with Edward Teller's promise of much lighter nuclear warheads during Project Nobska, led the Navy to abandon Jupiter and begin development of their own solid-fuel missile. Aerojet's work with Hall was adapted for their UGM-27 Polaris starting in December 1956.

=== Missile farm concept ===
The US Air Force saw no pressing need for a solid fuel ICBM. Development of the SM-65 Atlas and SM-68 Titan ICBMs was progressing, and "storable" (hypergolic) liquid propellants were being developed that would allow missiles to be left in a ready-to-shoot form for extended periods. These could be placed in missile silos for added protection, and launch in minutes. This met their need for a weapon that would be safe from sneak attacks; the possibility of the Soviets hitting all of the silos within a limited time window before they could launch simply did not seem possible.

But Hall saw solid fuels not only as a way to improve launch times or survivability, but part of a radical plan to greatly reduce the cost of ICBMs so that thousands could be built. He envisioned a future where ICBMs were the primary weapon of the US, not in the supporting role of "last ditch backup" as the Air Force saw them at the time. This would require huge deployments, which would not be possible with existing weapons due to their high cost and operational manpower requirements. A solid fuel design would be simpler to build, and easier to maintain.

Hall's ultimate plan was to build a number of integrated missile "farms" that included factories, missile silos, transport and recycling. He was aware that new computerized assembly lines would allow continual production, and that similar equipment would allow a small team to oversee operations for dozens or hundreds of missiles, radically reducing the manpower requirements. Each farm would support between 1,000 and 1,500 missiles being produced in a continuous low rate cycle. Systems in a missile would detect failures, at which point it would be removed and recycled, while a newly built missile would take its place. The missile design was based purely on lowest possible cost, reducing its size and complexity because "the basis of the weapon's merit was its low cost per completed mission; all other factors – accuracy, vulnerability, and reliability – were secondary."

"Minutemen Missile And Mission" (1962) Official de-classified information film reel.

Hall's plan did not go unopposed, especially by the more established names in the ICBM field. Ramo-Wooldridge pressed for a system with higher accuracy, but Hall countered that the missile's role was to attack Soviet cities, and that "a force which provides numerical superiority over the enemy will provide a much stronger deterrent than a numerically inferior force of greater accuracy." Hall was known for his "friction with others" and in 1958 Schriever removed him from the Minuteman project, sending him to the UK to oversee deployment of the Thor IRBM. On his return to the US in 1959, Hall retired from the Air Force. He received his second Legion of Merit in 1960 for his work on solid fuels.

Although he was removed from the Minuteman project, Hall's work on cost reduction had already produced a new design of 71 inches (1.8 m) diameter, much smaller than the Atlas and Titan at 120 inches (3.0 m), which meant smaller and cheaper silos. Hall's goal of dramatic cost reduction was a success, although many of the other concepts of his missile farm were abandoned.

=== Guidance system ===
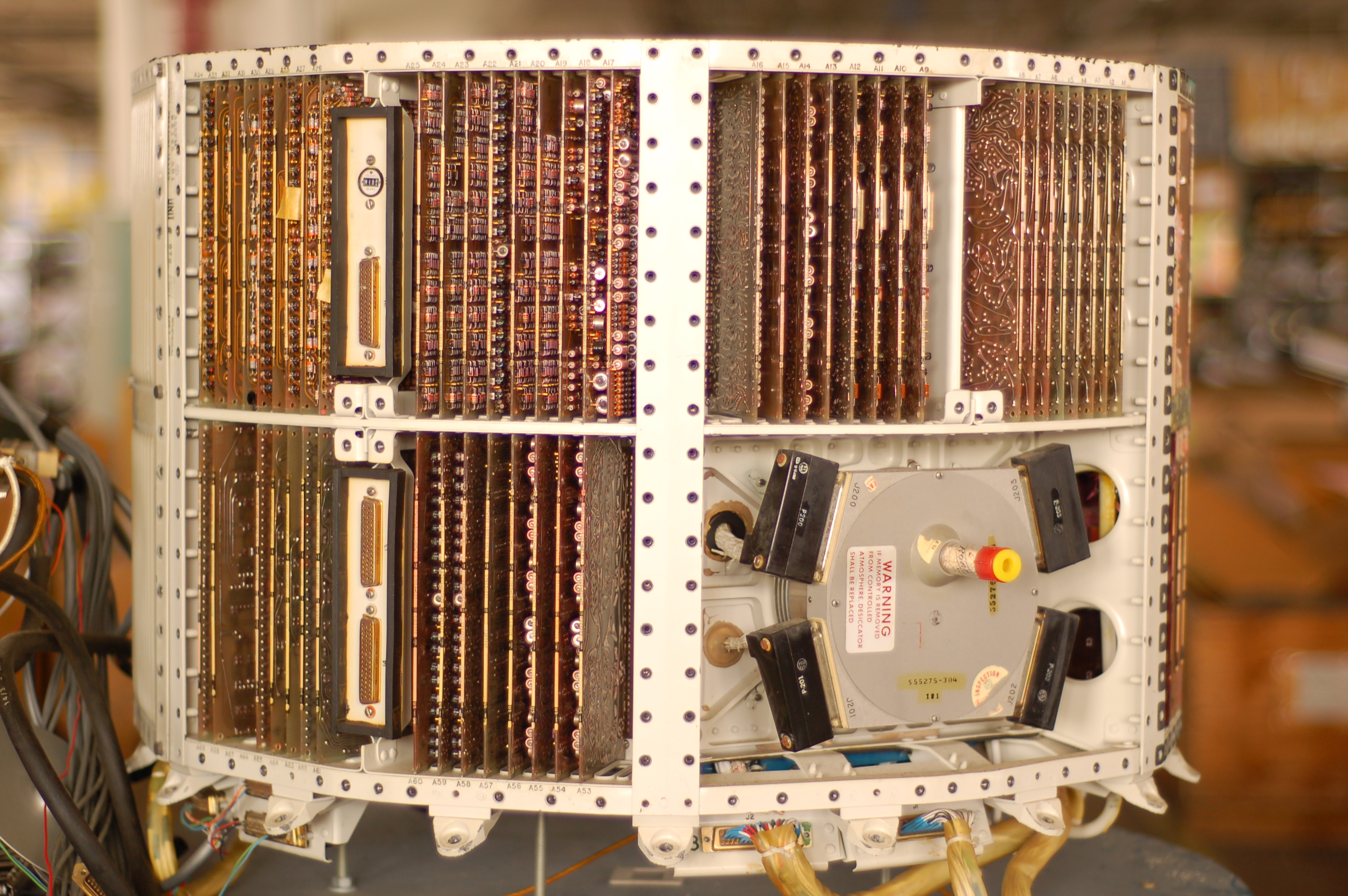
Autonetics D-17 guidance computer from a Minuteman I missile.

Previous long-range missiles used liquid fuels that could be loaded only just prior to firing. The loading process took from 30 to 60 minutes in typical designs. Although lengthy, this was not considered to be a problem at the time, because it took about the same amount of time to spin up the inertial guidance system, set the initial position, and program in the target coordinates.

Minuteman was designed from the outset to be launched in minutes. While solid fuel eliminated the fueling delays, the delays in starting and aligning the guidance system remained. For the desired quick launch, the guidance system would have to be kept running and aligned at all times. This was a serious problem for the mechanical systems, especially the gyroscopes which used ball bearings.

Autonetics had an experimental design using air bearings that they claimed had been running continually from 1952 to 1957. Autonetics further advanced the state of the art by building the platform in the form of a ball which could rotate in two directions. Conventional solutions used a shaft with ball bearings at either end that allowed it to rotate around a single axis only. Autonetics' design meant that only two gyros would be needed for the inertial platform, instead of the typical three. (Note: A third gyro was later added for other reasons.)

The last major advance was to use a general-purpose digital computer in place of the analog or custom designed digital computers. Previous missile designs normally used two single-purpose and very simple electromechanical computers; one ran the autopilot that kept the missile flying along a programmed course, and the second compared the information from the inertial platform to the target coordinates and sent any needed corrections to the autopilot. To reduce the total number of parts used in Minuteman, a single faster computer was used, running separate subroutines for these functions.

"The Martin Company: Ten Years To Remember" (1964). Official USAF ICBM development promotional film reel.

Since the guidance program would not be running while the missile sat in the silo, the same computer was also used to run a program that monitored the various sensors and test equipment. With older designs this had been handled by external systems, requiring miles of extra wiring and many connectors to locations where test instruments could be connected during servicing. Now these could all be accomplished by communicating with the computer through a single connection. In order to store multiple programs, the computer, the D-17B, was built in the form of a drum machine but used a hard disk in place of the drum.

Building a computer with the required performance, size and weight demanded the use of transistors, which were at that time very expensive and not very reliable. Earlier efforts to use computers for guidance, BINAC and the system on the SM-64 Navaho, had failed and were abandoned. The Air Force and Autonetics spent millions on a program to improve transistor and component reliability 100 times, leading to the "Minuteman high-rel parts" specifications. The techniques developed during this program were equally useful for improving all transistor construction, and greatly reduced the failure rate of transistor production lines in general. This improved yield, which had the effect of greatly lowering production costs, had enormous spin-off effects in the electronics industry.

Using a general-purpose computer also had long-lasting effects on the Minuteman program and the US's nuclear stance in general. With Minuteman, the targeting could be easily changed by loading new trajectory information into the computer's hard drive, a task that could be completed in a few hours. Earlier ICBMs' custom wired computers, on the other hand, could have attacked only a single target, whose precise trajectory information was hard-coded directly in the system's logic.

=== Missile gap ===
In 1957, a series of intelligence reports suggested the Soviet Union was far ahead in the missile race and would be able to overwhelm the US by the early 1960s. If the Soviets were building missiles in the numbers being predicted by the CIA and others within the defense establishment, by as early as 1961 they would have enough to attack all SAC and ICBM bases in the US in a single first strike. It was later demonstrated that this "missile gap" was just as fictional as the "bomber gap" of a few years earlier, but through the late 1950s, it was a serious concern.

The Air Force responded by beginning research into survivable strategic missiles, starting the WS-199 program. Initially, this focused on air-launched ballistic missiles, which would be carried aboard aircraft flying far from the Soviet Union, and thus impossible to attack by either ICBM, because they were moving, or long-range interceptor aircraft, because they were too far away. In the shorter term, looking to rapidly increase the number of missiles in its force, Minuteman was given crash development status starting in September 1958. Advanced surveying of the potential silo sites had already begun in late 1957.

"Minuteman In The West" (1965) - official U.S. Department of Defense information film reel.

Adding to their concerns was a Soviet anti-ballistic missile system which was known to be under development at Sary Shagan. WS-199 was expanded to develop a maneuvering reentry vehicle (MARV), which greatly complicated the problem of shooting down a warhead. Two designs were tested in 1957, Alpha Draco and the Boost Glide Reentry Vehicle. These used long and skinny arrow-like shapes that provided aerodynamic lift in the high atmosphere, and could be fitted to existing missiles like Minuteman.

The shape of these reentry vehicles required more room on the front of the missile than a traditional reentry vehicle design. To allow for this future expansion, the Minuteman silos were revised to be built 13 feet (4.0 m) deeper. Although Minuteman would not deploy a boost-glide warhead, the extra space proved invaluable in the future, as it allowed the missile to be extended and carry more fuel and payload.

=== Polaris ===
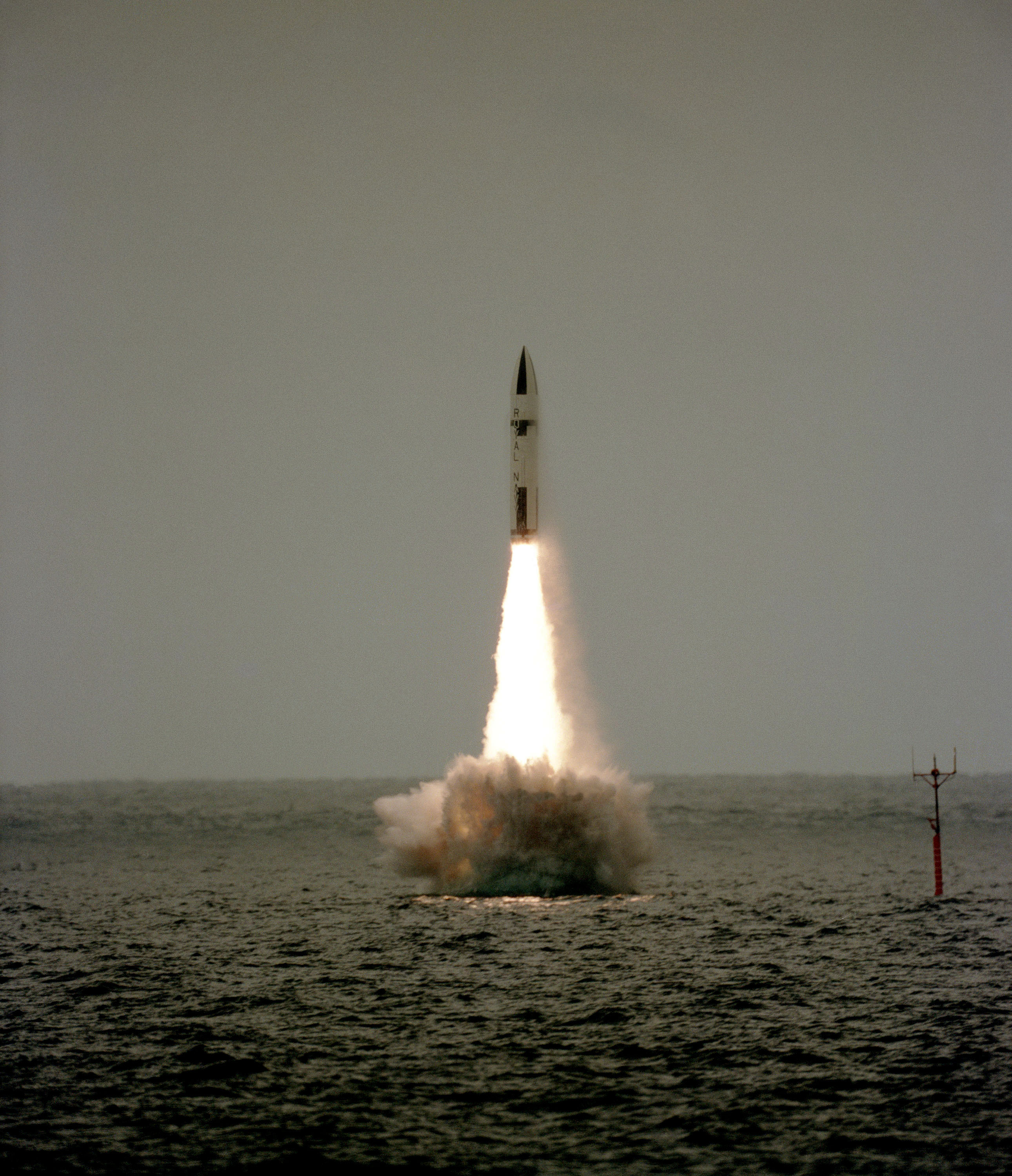
The Polaris SLBM could ostensibly fill the role of the Minuteman, and was perceived as significantly less vulnerable to attack.

During Minuteman's early development, the Air Force maintained the policy that the manned strategic bomber was the primary weapon of nuclear war. Blind bombing accuracy on the order of 1,500 feet (0.46 km) was expected, and the weapons were sized to ensure even the hardest targets would be destroyed as long as the weapon fell within this range. The USAF had enough bombers to attack every military and industrial target in the USSR and was confident that its bombers would survive in sufficient numbers that such a strike would utterly destroy the country.

Soviet ICBMs upset this equation to a degree. Their accuracy was known to be low, on the order of 4 nautical miles (7.4 km; 4.6 mi), but they carried large warheads that would be useful against Strategic Air Command's bombers, which parked in the open. Since there was no system to detect the ICBMs being launched, the possibility was raised that the Soviets could launch a sneak attack with a few dozen missiles that would take out a significant portion of SAC's bomber fleet.

In this environment, the Air Force saw their own ICBMs not as a primary weapon of war, but as a way to ensure that the Soviets would not risk a sneak attack. ICBMs, especially newer models that were housed in silos, could be expected to survive an attack by a single Soviet missile. In any conceivable scenario where both sides had similar numbers of ICBMs, the US forces would survive a sneak attack in sufficient numbers to ensure the destruction of all major Soviet cities in return. The Soviets would not risk an attack under these conditions.

Considering this countervalue attack concept, strategic planners calculated that an attack of "400 equivalent megatons" aimed at the largest Soviet cities would promptly kill 30% of their population and destroy 50% of their industry. Larger attacks raised these numbers only slightly, as all of the larger targets would already have been hit. This suggested that there was a "finite deterrent" level around 400 megatons that would be enough to prevent a Soviet attack no matter how many missiles they had of their own. All that had to be ensured was that the US missiles survived, which seemed likely given the low accuracy of the Soviet weapons. Reversing the problem, the addition of ICBMs to the US Air Force's arsenal did not eliminate the need, or desire, to attack Soviet military targets, and the Air Force maintained that bombers were the only suitable platform in that role.

Into this argument came the Navy's UGM-27 Polaris. Launched from submarines, Polaris was effectively invulnerable and had enough accuracy to attack Soviet cities. If the Soviets improved the accuracy of their missiles this would present a serious threat to the Air Force's bombers and missiles, but none at all to the Navy's submarines. Based on the same 400 equivalent megatons calculation, they set about building a fleet of 41 submarines carrying 16 missiles each, giving the Navy a finite deterrent that was unassailable.

This presented a serious problem for the Air Force. They were still pressing for the development of newer bombers, like the supersonic B-70, for attacks against military targets, but this role seemed increasingly unlikely in a nuclear war scenario. A February 1960 memo by RAND, entitled "The Puzzle of Polaris", was passed around among high-ranking Air Force officials. It suggested that Polaris negated any need for Air Force ICBMs if they were also being aimed at Soviet cities. If the role of the missile was to present an unassailable threat to the Soviet population, Polaris was a far better solution than Minuteman. The document had long-lasting effects on the future of the Minuteman program, which, by 1961, was firmly evolving towards a counterforce capability.

=== Kennedy ===
Minuteman's final tests coincided with the start of John F. Kennedy's presidency. His new Secretary of Defense, Robert McNamara, was tasked with continuing the expansion and modernization of the U.S. nuclear deterrent while limiting spending. McNamara began to apply cost/benefit analysis, and Minuteman's low production cost ensured its selection. Atlas and Titan were soon scrapped, and the storable liquid fueled Titan II deployment was severely curtailed. McNamara also cancelled the XB-70 bomber project.

Minuteman's low cost had spin-off effects on non-ICBM programs. The Army's LIM-49 Nike Zeus, an interceptor missile capable of shooting down Soviet warheads, provided another way to prevent a sneak attack. This had initially been proposed as a way to defend the SAC bomber fleet. The Army argued that upgraded Soviet missiles might be able to attack US missiles in their silos, and Zeus would be able to blunt such an attack. Zeus was expensive and the Air Force said it was more cost-effective to build another Minuteman missile. Given the large size and complexity of the Soviet liquid-fueled missiles, an ICBM building race was one the Soviets could not afford. Zeus was canceled in 1963.

=== Counterforce ===
Minuteman's selection as the primary Air Force ICBM was initially based on the same "second strike" logic as their earlier missiles: that the weapon was primarily one designed to survive any potential Soviet attack and ensure they would be hit in return. But Minuteman had a combination of features that led to its rapid evolution into the US's primary weapon of nuclear war.

Chief among these qualities was its digital computer, the D-17B. This could be updated in the field with new targets and better information about the flight paths with relative ease, gaining accuracy for little cost. One of the unavoidable effects on the warhead's trajectory was the mass of the Earth, which contains many mass concentrations that pull on the warhead as it passes over them. Through the 1960s, the Defense Mapping Agency (now part of National Geospatial-Intelligence Agency) mapped these with increasing accuracy, feeding that information back into the Minuteman fleet. The Minuteman was initially deployed with a circular error probable (CEP) of about 1.1 nautical miles (2.0 km; 1.3 mi), but this had improved to about 0.6 nautical miles (1.1 km; 0.69 mi) by 1965. This was accomplished without any mechanical changes to the missile or its navigation system.

At those levels, the ICBM begins to approach the manned bomber in terms of accuracy; a small upgrade, roughly doubling the accuracy of the INS, would give it the same 1,500 feet (460 m) CEP as the manned bomber. Autonetics began such development even before the original Minuteman entered fleet service, and the Minuteman II had a CEP of 0.26 nautical miles (0.48 km; 0.30 mi). Additionally, the computers were upgraded with more memory, allowing them to store information for eight targets, which the missile crews could select among almost instantly, greatly increasing their flexibility. From that point, Minuteman became the US's primary deterrent weapon, until its performance was matched by the Navy's Trident missile of the 1980s.

Questions about the need for the manned bomber were quickly raised. The Air Force began to offer a number of reasons why the bomber offered value, in spite of costing more money to buy and being much more expensive to operate and maintain. Newer bombers with better survivability, like the B-70, cost many times more than the Minuteman, and, in spite of great efforts through the 1960s, became increasingly vulnerable to surface-to-air missiles. The B-1 of the early 1970s eventually emerged with a price tag around $200 million (equivalent to $600 million in 2024) while the Minuteman IIIs built during the 1970s cost only $7 million ($30 million in 2024).

The Air Force countered that having a variety of platforms complicated the defense; if the Soviets built an effective anti-ballistic missile system of some sort, the ICBM and SLBM fleet might be rendered useless, while the bombers would remain. This became the nuclear triad concept, which survives into the present. Although this argument was successful, the number of manned bombers has been repeatedly cut and the deterrent role increasingly passed to missiles.

=== Minuteman I (LGM-30A/B or SM-80/HSM-80A) ===
See also W56 Warhead

==== Deployment ====
"Primed for Defense: The Minuteman Missile System" - Official USAF information film reel.

The LGM-30A Minuteman I was first test-fired on 1 February 1961 at Cape Canaveral, entering into the Strategic Air Command's arsenal in 1962. After the first batch of Minuteman I's were fully developed and ready for stationing, the United States Air Force (USAF) had originally decided to put the missiles at Vandenberg AFB in California, but before the missiles were set to officially be moved there it was discovered that this first set of Minuteman missiles had defective boosters which limited their range from their initial 6,300 miles (10,100 km) to 4,300 miles (6,900 km). This defect would cause the missiles to fall short of their targets if launched over the North Pole as planned. The decision was made to station the missiles at Malmstrom AFB in Montana instead. These changes would allow the missiles, even with their defective boosters, to reach their intended targets in the case of a launch.

The "improved" LGM-30B Minuteman I became operational at Ellsworth AFB, South Dakota, Minot AFB, North Dakota, F.E. Warren AFB, Wyoming, and Whiteman AFB, Missouri, in 1963 and 1964. All 800 Minuteman I missiles were delivered by June 1965. Each of the bases had 150 missiles emplaced; F.E. Warren had 200 of the Minuteman IB missiles. Malmstrom had 150 of the Minuteman I, and about five years later added 50 of the Minuteman II similar to those installed at Grand Forks AFB, ND.

==== Specifications ====
The Minuteman I's length varied by variant. The Minuteman I/A had a length of 53 ft 8 in (16.36 m) and the Minuteman I/B had a length of 55 ft 11 in (17.04 m). The Minuteman I weighed roughly 65,000 lb (29,000 kg), had an operational range of 5,500 nmi (6,300 mi; 10,200 km) with an accuracy of about 1.5 mi (2.4 km).

==== Guidance ====
The Minuteman I Autonetics D-17 flight computer used a rotating air bearing magnetic disk holding 2,560 "cold-stored" words in 20 tracks (write heads disabled after program fill) of 24 bits each and one alterable track of 128 words. The time for a D-17 disk revolution was 10 ms. The D-17 also used a number of short loops for faster access to intermediate results storage. The D-17 computational minor cycle was three disk revolutions or 30 ms. During that time all recurring computations were performed. For ground operations, the inertial platform was aligned and gyro correction rates updated.

During a flight, filtered command outputs were sent by each minor cycle to the engine nozzles. Unlike modern computers, which use descendants of that technology for secondary storage on hard disk, the disk was the active computer memory. The disk storage was considered hardened to radiation from nearby nuclear explosions, making it an ideal storage medium. To improve computational speed, the D-17 borrowed an instruction look-ahead feature from the Autonetics-built Field Artillery Data Computer (M18 FADAC) that permitted simple instruction execution every word time.

==== Warhead ====
At its introduction into service in 1962, Minuteman I was fitted with the W59 warhead with a yield of 1 Mt. Production for the W56 warhead with a 1.2 Mt yield began in March 1963 and W59 production was ended in July 1963 with a production run of only 150 warheads before being retired in June 1969. The W56 would continue production until May 1969 with a production run of 1000 warheads. Mods 0 to 3 were retired by September 1966 and the Mod 4 version would remain in service until the 1990s.

It's not clear exactly why the W59 was replaced by the W56 after deployment but issues with "... one-point safety" and "performance under aged conditions" were cited in a 1987 congressional report regarding the warhead. Chuck Hansen alleged that all weapons sharing the "Tsetse" nuclear primary design including the W59 suffered from a critical one-point safety issue and suffered premature tritium aging issues that needed to be corrected after entry into service.

=== Minuteman II (LGM-30F) ===
See also W56 warhead

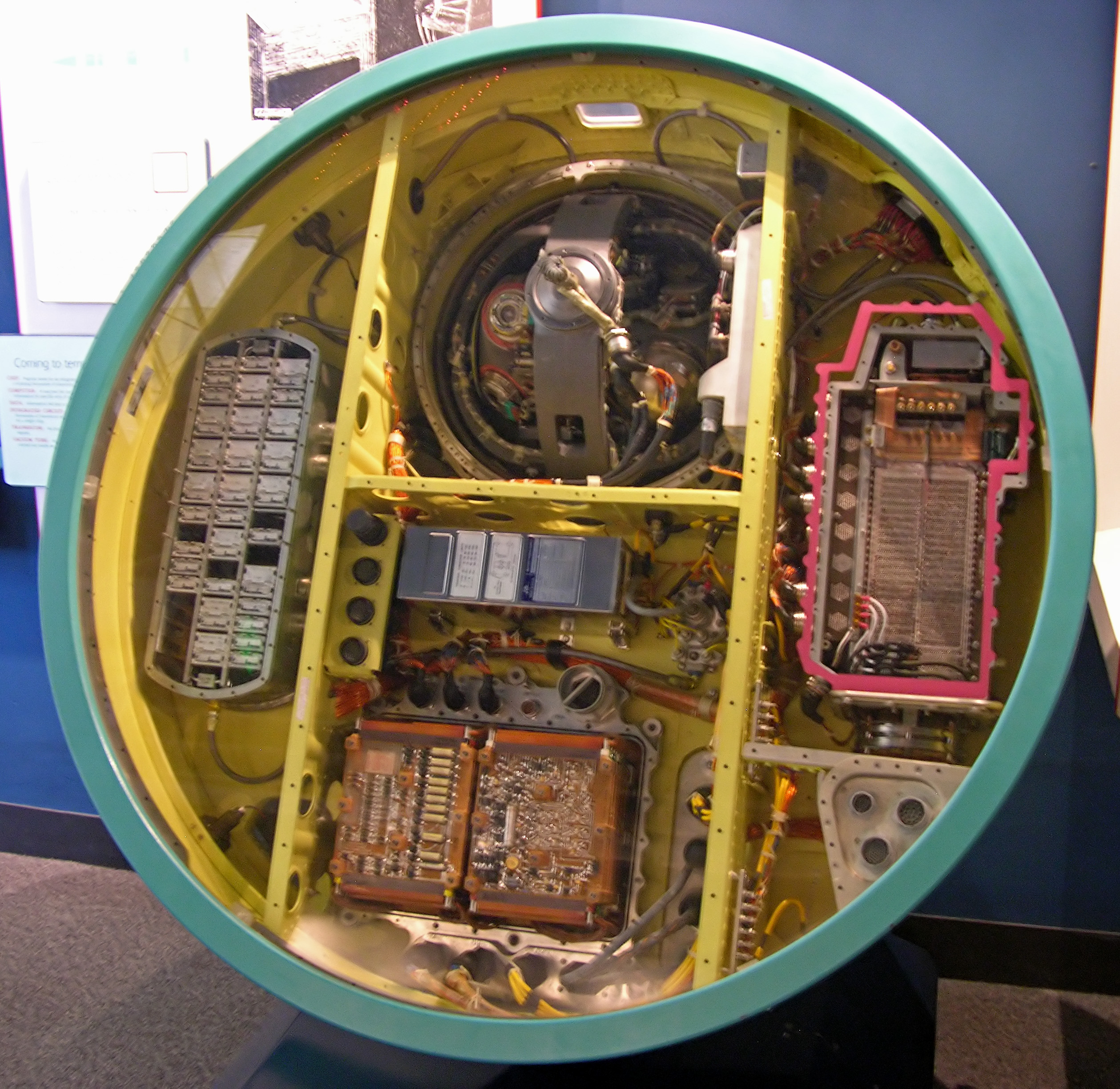
The guidance system of the Minuteman II was much smaller due to the use of integrated circuits. The inertial platform is in the top bay.

The LGM-30F Minuteman II was an improved version of the Minuteman I missile. Its first test launch took place on September 24, 1964. Development on the Minuteman II began in 1962 as the Minuteman I entered the Strategic Air Command's nuclear force. Minuteman II production and deployment began in 1965 and completed in 1967. It had an increased range, greater throw weight and guidance system with better azimuthal coverage, providing military planners with better accuracy and a wider range of targets. Some missiles also carried penetration aids, allowing the higher probability of kill against Moscow's anti-ballistic missile system. The payload consisted of a single Mk-11C reentry vehicle containing a W56 nuclear warhead with a yield of 1.2 megatons of TNT (5 PJ).

==== Specifications ====
The Minuteman II had a length of 57 ft 7 in (17.55 m), weighed roughly 73,000 lb (33,000 kg), had an operational range of 6,300 mi (10,200 km) with an accuracy of about 1 mi (1.6 km).

The major new features provided by Minuteman II were:

- An improved first-stage motor to increase reliability.
- A novel, single, fixed nozzle with liquid injection thrust vector control on a larger second-stage motor to increase missile range. Additional motor improvements to increase reliability.
- An improved guidance system (the D-37 flight computer), incorporating microchips and miniaturized discrete electronic parts. Minuteman II was the first program to make a major commitment to these new devices. Their use made possible multiple target selection, greater accuracy and reliability, a reduction in the overall size and weight of the guidance system, and an increase in the survivability of the guidance system in a nuclear environment. The guidance system contained 2,000 microchips made by Texas Instruments.
- A penetration aids system to camouflage the warhead during its reentry into an enemy environment. In addition, the Mk-11C reentry vehicle incorporated stealth features to reduce its radar signature and make it more difficult to distinguish from decoys. The Mk-11C was no longer made of titanium for this and other reasons.
- A larger warhead in the reentry vehicle to increase kill probability.

System modernization was concentrated on launch facilities and command and control facilities. This provided decreased reaction time and increased survivability when under nuclear attack. Final changes to the system were performed to increase compatibility with the expected LGM-118A Peacekeeper. These newer missiles were later deployed into modified Minuteman silos.

The Minuteman II program was the first mass-produced system to use a computer constructed from integrated circuits (the Autonetics D-37C). The Minuteman II integrated circuits were diode–transistor logic and diode logic made by Texas Instruments. The other major customer of early integrated circuits was the Apollo Guidance Computer, which had similar weight and ruggedness constraints. The Apollo integrated circuits were resistor–transistor logic made by Fairchild Semiconductor. The Minuteman II flight computer continued to use rotating magnetic disks for primary storage. The Minuteman II included diodes by Microsemi Corporation.

=== Minuteman III (LGM-30G) ===
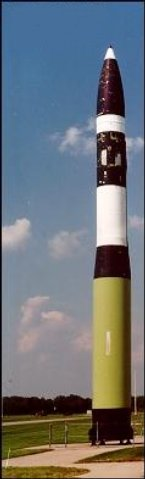
Minuteman III

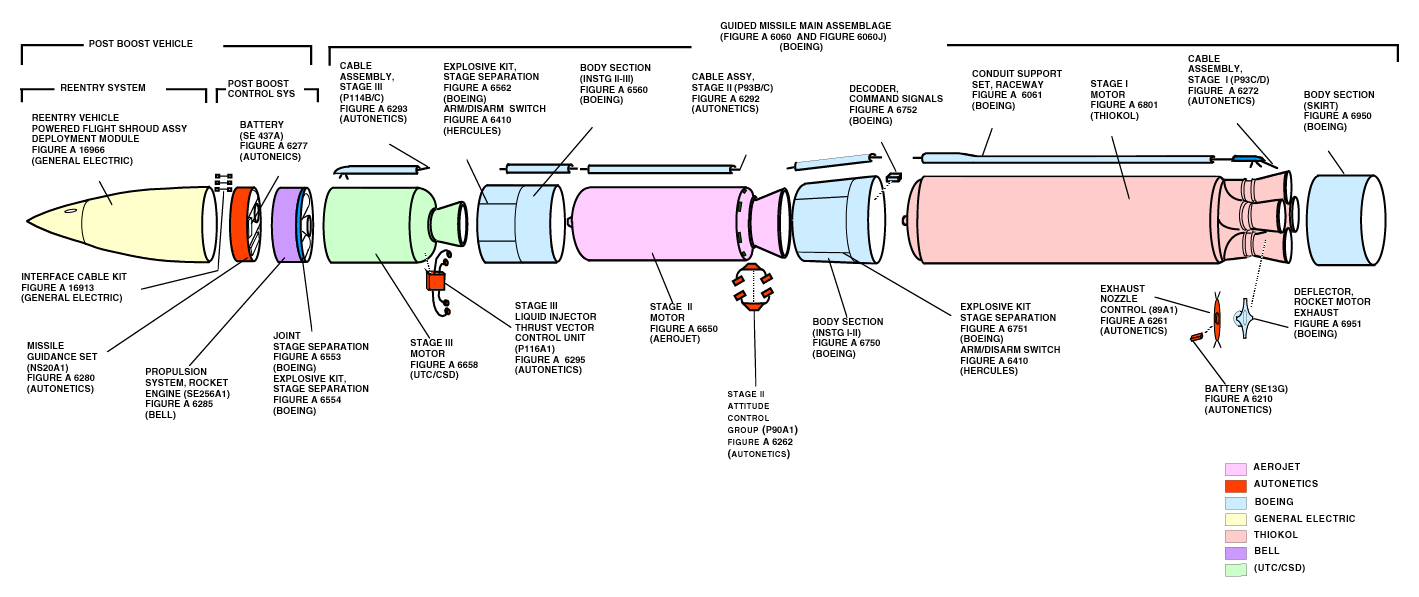
Side view of Minuteman III ICBM

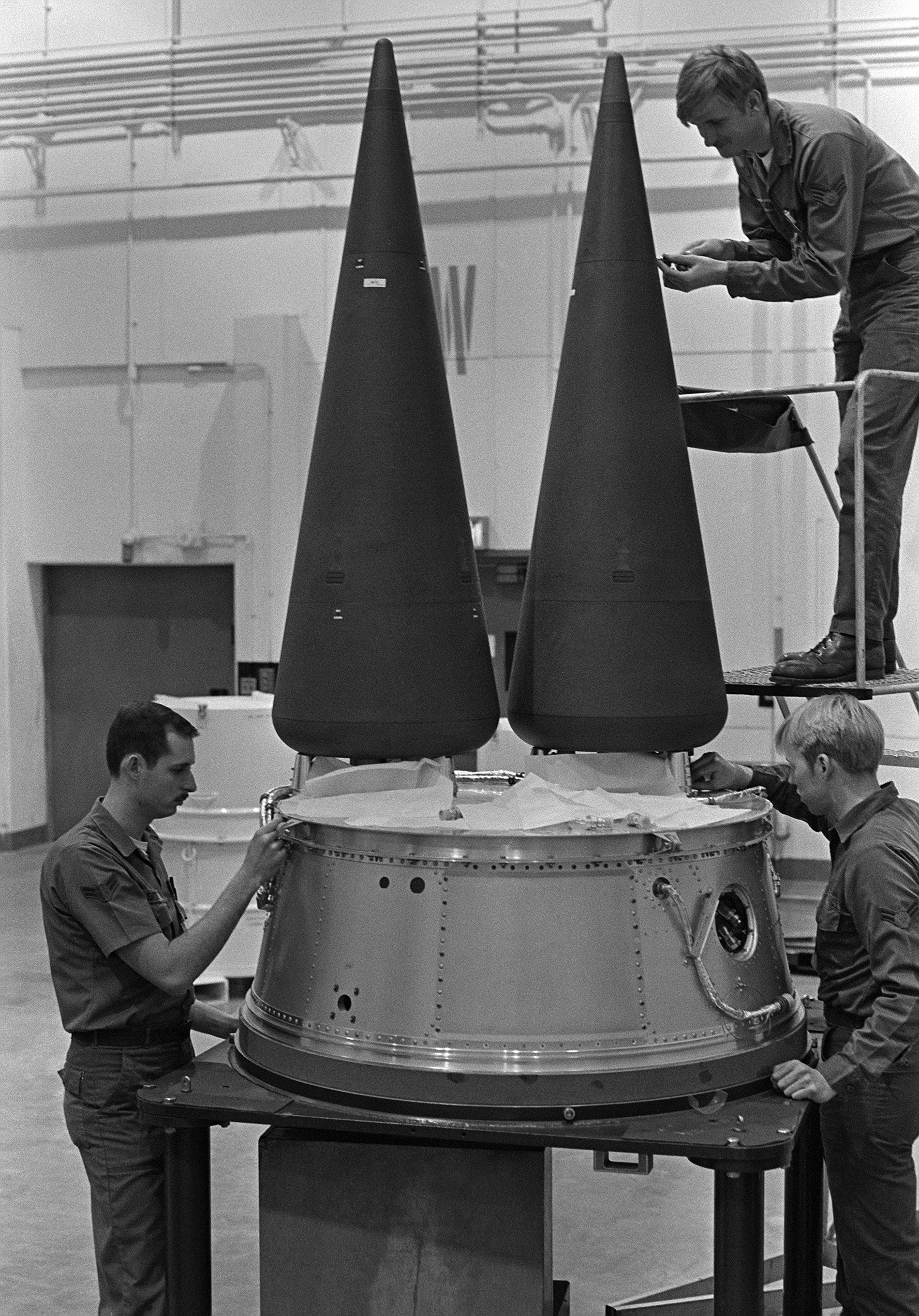
Airmen work on a Minuteman III's multiple independently-targetable re-entry vehicle (MIRV) system. Current missiles carry a single warhead.

See also W62 warhead

The LGM-30G Minuteman III program started in 1966 and included several improvements over the previous versions. Its first test launch took place on August 16, 1968. It was first deployed in 1970. Most modifications related to the final stage and reentry system (RS). The final (third) stage was improved with a new fluid-injected motor, giving finer control than the previous four-nozzle system. Performance improvements realized in Minuteman III include increased flexibility in reentry vehicle (RV) and penetration aids deployment, increased survivability after a nuclear attack, and increased payload capacity. The missile retains a gimballed inertial navigation system.

Minuteman III originally contained the following distinguishing features:

- Armed with up to three W62 Mk-12 warheads, having a yield of only 170 kilotons TNT, instead of previous W56's yield of 1.2 megatons.
- It was the first missile equipped with multiple independently targetable reentry vehicles (MIRV). A single missile was then able to target three separate locations. This was an improvement from the Minuteman I and Minuteman II models, which were able to carry only one large warhead.
  - An RS capable of deploying, in addition to the warheads, penetration aids such as chaff and decoys.
  - Minuteman III introduced in the post-boost-stage ("bus") an additional liquid-fuel propulsion system rocket engine (PSRE) that is used to slightly adjust the trajectory. This enables it to dispense decoys or – with MIRV – dispense individual RVs to separate targets. For the PSRE it uses the bipropellant Rocketdyne RS-14 engine.
- The Hercules M57 third stage of Minuteman I and Minuteman II had thrust termination ports on the sides. These ports, when opened by detonation of shaped charges, reduced the chamber pressure so abruptly that the interior flame was blown out. This allowed a precisely timed termination of thrust for targeting accuracy. The larger Minuteman III third-stage motor also has thrust termination ports although the final velocity is determined by PSRE.
- A fixed nozzle with a liquid injection thrust vector control system on the new third-stage motor (similar to the second-stage Minuteman II nozzle) additionally increased range.
- A flight computer (Autonetics D37D) with larger disk memory and enhanced capability.
  - A Honeywell HDC-701 flight computer which employed non-destructive readout plated-wire memory instead of rotating magnetic disk for primary storage was developed as a backup for the D37D but was never adopted.
  - The Guidance Replacement Program, initiated in 1993, replaced the disk-based D37D flight computer with a new one that uses radiation-resistant semiconductor RAM.

The Minuteman III missiles use D-37D computers and complete the 1,000 missile deployment of this system. The initial cost of these computers range from about $139,000 (D-37C) to $250,000 (D-17B).

Minuteman III MIRV launch sequence: 1. The missile launches out of its silo by firing its 1st-stage boost motor (A).; 2. About 60 seconds after launch, the 1st stage drops off and the 2nd-stage motor (B) ignites. The missile shroud (E) is ejected.; 3. About 120 seconds after launch, the 3rd-stage motor (C) ignites and separates from the 2nd stage.; 4. About 180 seconds after launch, 3rd-stage thrust terminates and the Post-Boost Vehicle (D) separates from the rocket.; 5. The Post-Boost Vehicle maneuvers itself and prepares for re-entry vehicle (RV) deployment.; 6. The RVs, as well as decoys and chaff, are deployed during back away.; 7. The RVs and chaff re-enter the atmosphere at high speeds and are armed in flight.; 8. The nuclear warheads initiate, either as air bursts or ground bursts.

The existing Minuteman III missiles have been further improved over the decades in service, with more than $7 billion spent in the 2010s to upgrade the 450 missiles.

==== Specifications ====
The Minuteman III has a length of 59.9 ft (18.3 m), weighs 79,432 lb (36,030 kg), an operational range of 8,700 mi (14,000 km), and an accuracy of about 800 ft (240 m).

==== W78 warhead ====
In December 1979 the higher-yield W78 warhead (335–350 kilotons) began replacing a number of the W62s deployed on the Minuteman IIIs. These were delivered in the Mark 12A reentry vehicle. A small, unknown number of the previous Mark 12 RVs were retained operationally, however, to maintain a capability to attack more-distant targets in the south-central Asian republics of the USSR (the Mark 12 RV weighed slightly less than the Mark 12A).

==== Guidance Replacement Program ====
The Guidance Replacement Program replaces the NS20A Missile Guidance Set with the NS50 Missile Guidance Set. The newer system extends the service life of the Minuteman missile beyond the year 2030 by replacing aging parts and assemblies with current, high reliability technology while maintaining the current accuracy performance. The replacement program was completed 25 February 2008.

==== Propulsion Replacement Program ====
Beginning in 1998 and continuing through 2009, the Propulsion Replacement Program extends the life and maintains the performance by replacing the old solid propellant boosters (downstages).

==== Single Reentry Vehicle ====
The Single Reentry Vehicle modification enabled the United States ICBM force to abide by the now-voided START II treaty requirements by reconfiguring Minuteman III missiles from three reentry vehicles down to one. Though it was eventually ratified by both parties, START II never entered into force and was essentially superseded by follow-on agreements such as SORT and New START, which do not limit MIRV capability. Minuteman III remains fitted with a single warhead due to the warhead limitations in New START.

==== Safety Enhanced Reentry Vehicle ====
Beginning in 2005, a limited number of Mk-21/W87 RVs from the deactivated Peacekeeper missile were placed on the Minuteman III force under the Safety Enhanced Reentry Vehicle (SERV) program. The older W62 warheads did not have many of the safety features of the newer W87, such as insensitive high explosives, as well as more advanced safety devices. In addition to implementing these safety features in at least a portion of the future Minuteman III force, the decision to transfer W87s onto the missile was based on two features that improved the targeting capabilities of the weapon: more fuzing options which allowed for greater targeting flexibility, and the most accurate reentry vehicle available, which provided a greater probability of damage to the designated targets.

==== Deployment ====
The Minuteman III missile entered service in 1970, with weapon systems upgrades included during the production run from 1970 to 1978 to increase accuracy and payload capacity. As of June 2024, the USAF plans to operate it until the mid-2030s.

The LGM-118A Peacekeeper (MX) ICBM, which was to have replaced the Minuteman, was retired in 2005 as part of SORT.

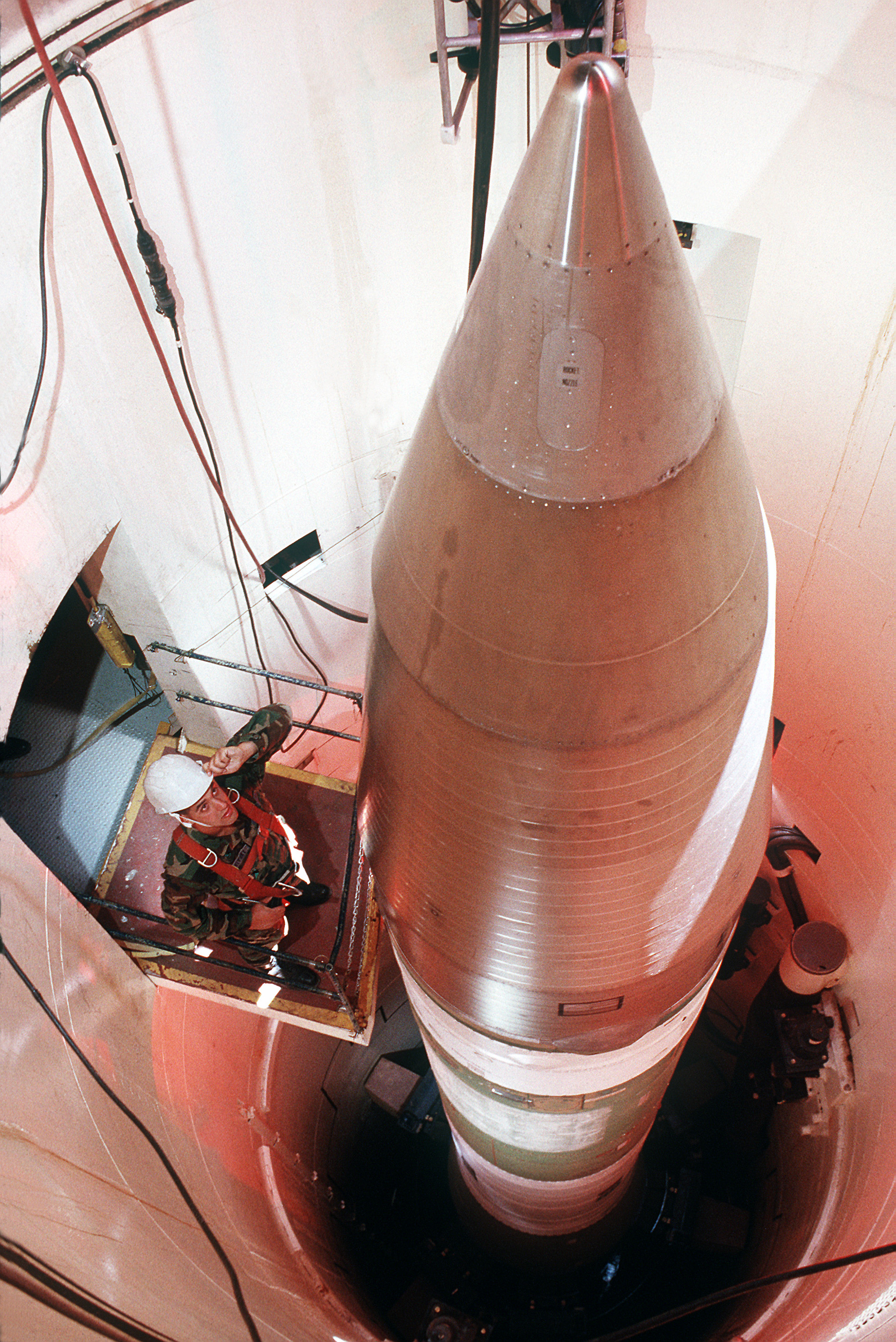
A Minuteman III missile in its silo

A total of 400 LGM-30G missiles are emplaced at F.E. Warren Air Force Base, Wyoming (90th Missile Wing), Minot Air Force Base, North Dakota (91st Missile Wing), and Malmstrom Air Force Base, Montana (341st Missile Wing). All Minuteman I and Minuteman II missiles have been retired. The United States prefers to keep its MIRV deterrents on submarine-launched Trident Nuclear Missiles In 2014, the Air Force decided to put fifty Minuteman III silos into "warm" unarmed status, taking up half of the 100 slots in America's allowable nuclear reserve. These can be reloaded in the future if necessary. Minot AFB and Malmstrom AFB each have 17 empty and 133 active silos in their missile fields. F.E. Warren AFB has 16 empty and 134 active silos.

==== Testing ====
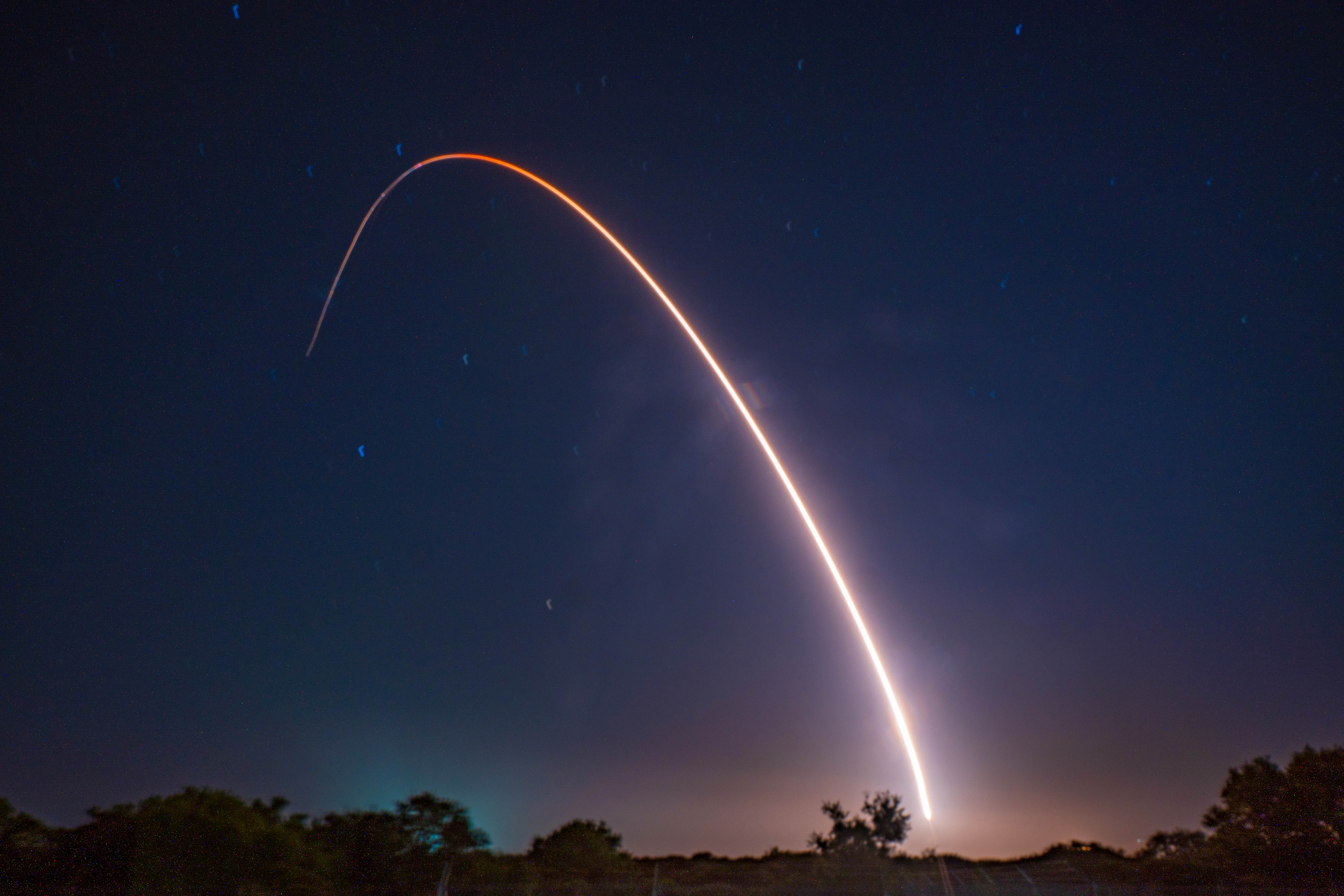
Unarmed Minuteman III launches during an operational test at Vandenberg Space Force Base (May 2025)

Minuteman III missiles are regularly tested with launches from Vandenberg Space Force Base in order to validate the effectiveness, readiness, and accuracy of the weapon system, as well as to support the system's primary purpose, nuclear deterrence. The safety features installed on the Minuteman III for each test launch allow the flight controllers to terminate the flight at any time if the systems indicate that its course may take it unsafely over inhabited areas. Since these flights are for test purposes only, even terminated flights can send back valuable information to correct a potential problem with the system.

The test of an unarmed Minuteman III failed on November 1, 2023, from Vandenberg Space Force Base, California. The U.S. Air Force said it had blown up the missile over the Pacific Ocean after an anomaly was detected following its launch.

The 576th Flight Test Squadron is responsible for planning, preparing, conducting, and assessing all ICBM ground and flight tests.

== Airborne Launch Control System (ALCS) ==
Minuteman Air Mobile Feasibility Demonstration (1970) de-classified official Strategic Air Command information film reel.

The Airborne Launch Control System (ALCS) is an integral part of the Minuteman ICBM command and control system and provides a survivable launch capability for the Minuteman ICBM force if ground-based launch control centers (LCCs) are destroyed.

When the Minuteman ICBM was first placed on alert, the Soviet Union did not have the number of weapons, accuracy, nor significant nuclear yield to completely destroy the Minuteman ICBM force during an attack. However, starting in the mid-1960s, the Soviets began to gain parity with the US and potentially had the capability to target and successfully attack the Minuteman force with an increased number of ICBMs that had greater yields and accuracy than were previously available.

Studying the problem, SAC realized that in order to prevent the U.S. from launching all 1,000 Minuteman ICBMs, the Soviets did not have to target all 1,000 Minuteman missile silos. The Soviets needed to launch only a disarming decapitation strike against the 100 Minuteman LCCs – the command and control sites – in order to prevent the launch of all Minuteman ICBMs. Even though the Minuteman ICBMs would have been left unscathed in their missile silos following an LCC decapitation strike, the Minuteman missiles could not be launched without a command and control capability.

In other words, the Soviets needed only 100 warheads to eliminate command and control of the Minuteman ICBMs. Even if the Soviets chose to expend two to three warheads per LCC for assured damage expectancy, the Soviets would have had to expend only up to 300 warheads to disable the Minuteman ICBM force – far less than the total number of Minuteman silos. The Soviets could have then used the remaining warheads to strike other targets they chose.

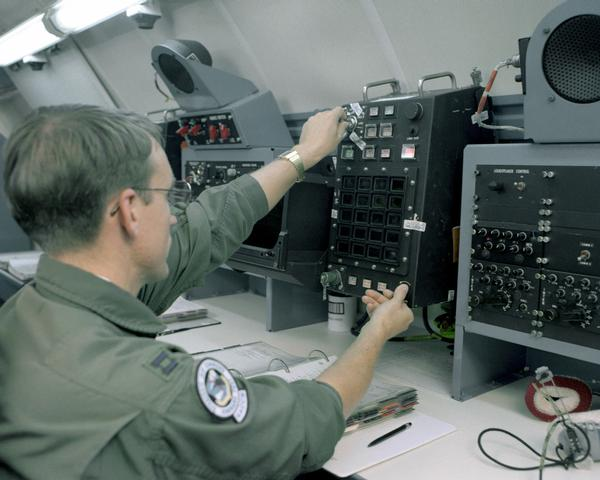
An Airborne Missileer operating Common ALCS on board an EC-135A ALCC

Faced with only a few Minuteman LCC targets, the Soviets could have concluded that the odds of being successful in a Minuteman LCC decapitation strike were higher with less risk than it would have been having to face the almost insurmountable task of successfully attacking and destroying 1000 Minuteman silos and 100 Minuteman LCCs to ensure Minuteman was disabled. This theory motivated SAC to design a survivable means to launch Minuteman, even if all the ground-based command and control sites were destroyed.

After thorough testing and modification of EC-135 command post aircraft, the ALCS demonstrated its capability on 17 April 1967 by launching an ERCS configured Minuteman II out of Vandenberg AFB, CA. Afterward, ALCS achieved Initial Operational Capability on 31 May 1967. From that point on, airborne missileers stood alert with ALCS-capable EC-135 aircraft for several decades. All Minuteman ICBM Launch Facilities were modified and built to have the capability to receive commands from ALCS. With ALCS standing alert around-the-clock, the Soviets could no longer successfully launch a Minuteman LCC decapitation strike. Even if the Soviets attempted to do so, EC-135s equipped with the ALCS could fly overhead and launch the remaining Minuteman ICBMs in retaliation.

With the ALCS on alert, the Soviet war planning was complicated by forcing them to target not only the 100 LCCs, but also the 1,000 silos with more than one warhead in order to guarantee destruction. This would have required upwards of 3,000 warheads to complete such an attack. The odds of being successful in such an attack on the Minuteman ICBM force would have been extremely low.

The ALCS is operated by airborne missileers from the Air Force Global Strike Command's (AFGSC) 625th Strategic Operations Squadron (STOS) and United States Strategic Command (USSTRATCOM). The weapon system is also located on board the United States Navy's E-6B Mercury. The ALCS crews are integrated into the battle staff of the USSTRATCOM "Looking Glass" Airborne Command Post (ABNCP) and are on alert around-the-clock. Although the Minuteman ICBM force has been reduced since the end of the Cold War, the ALCS continues to act as a force multiplier by ensuring that some enemy cannot launch a successful Minuteman LCC decapitation strike.

== Other roles ==
=== Mobile Minuteman ===
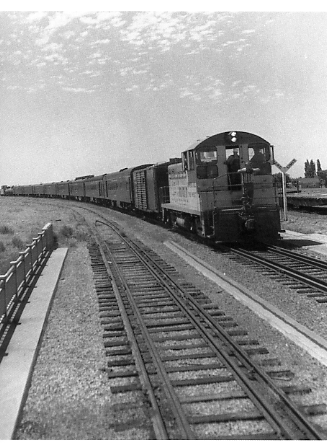
Some effort was given to a mobile version of Minuteman to improve its survivability, but this was later cancelled.

Mobile Minuteman was a program for rail-based ICBMs to help increase survivability and for which the USAF released details on 12 October 1959. Minuteman Mobility Test Trains were first exercised from 20 June to 27 August 1960 at Hill Air Force Base, and the 4062nd Strategic Missile Wing (Mobile) was organized 1 December 1960. It was planned to include three missile train squadrons, each with 10 trains carrying 3 missiles per train. During the Kennedy/McNamara force reductions, the Department of Defense announced "that it has abandoned the plan for a mobile Minuteman ICBM. The concept called for 600 to be placed in service – 450 in silos and 150 on special trains, each train carrying 5 missiles." Kennedy announced on 18 March 1961 that the 3 squadrons were to be replaced with "fixed-base squadrons", and Strategic Air Command discontinued the 4062nd Strategic Missile Wing on 20 February 1962.

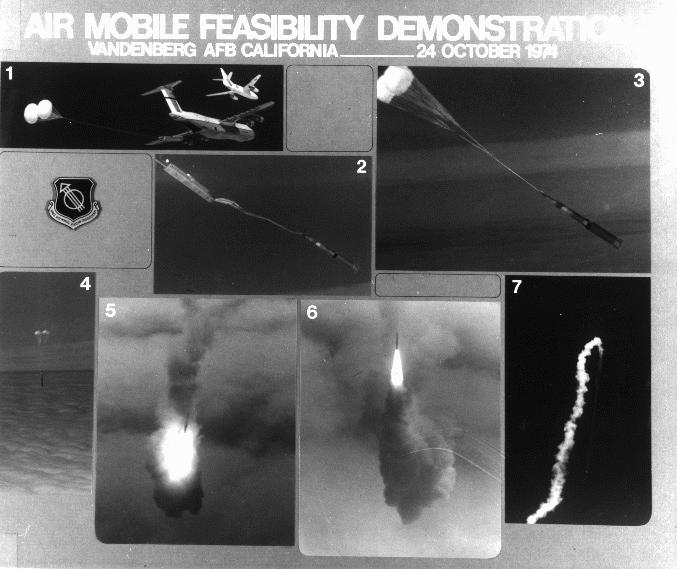
Air Mobile Feasibility Demonstration – 24 October 1974

=== Air-Launched ICBM ===
Air-Launched ICBM was a STRAT-X proposal in which SAMSO (Space & Missile Systems Organization) successfully conducted an Air Mobile Feasibility Test that airdropped a Minuteman 1b from a C-5A Galaxy aircraft from 20,000 ft (6,100 m) over the Pacific Ocean. The missile fired at 8,000 ft (2,400 m), and the 10-second engine burn carried the missile to 20,000 feet again before it dropped into the ocean. Operational deployment was discarded due to engineering and security difficulties, and the capability was a negotiating point in the Strategic Arms Limitation Talks.

=== Emergency Rocket Communications System (ERCS) ===
From 1963 through 1991, the National Command Authority communication relay system included the Emergency Rocket Communication System (ERCS). Specially designed rockets called BLUE SCOUT carried radio-transmitting payloads high above the continental United States, to relay messages to units within line-of-sight. In the event of a nuclear attack, ERCS payloads would relay pre-programmed messages giving the "go-order" to SAC units.

BLUE SCOUT launch sites were located at Wisner, West Point and Tekamah, Nebraska. These locations were vital for ERCS effectiveness due to their centralized position in the US, within range of all missile complexes. In 1968, ERCS configurations were placed on the top of modified Minuteman II ICBMs (LGM-30Fs) under the control of the 510th Strategic Missile Squadron located at Whiteman Air Force Base, Missouri.

The Minuteman ERCS may have been assigned the designation LEM-70A.

=== Satellite launching role ===
The U.S. Air Force has considered using some decommissioned Minuteman missiles in a satellite launching role. These missiles would be stored in silos, for launch upon short notice. The payload would be variable and would have the ability to be replaced quickly. This would allow a surge capability in times of emergency.

During the 1980s, surplus Minuteman missiles were used to power the Conestoga rocket produced by Space Services Inc. of America. It was the first privately funded rocket, but saw only three flights and was discontinued due to a lack of business. More recently, converted Minuteman missiles have been used to power the Minotaur line of rockets produced by Orbital Sciences (nowadays Northrop Grumman Innovation Systems).

=== Ground and air launch targets ===
L-3 Communications is currently using SR-19 SRBs, Minuteman II Second Stage Solid Rocket Boosters, as delivery vehicles for a range of different re-entry vehicles as targets for the THAAD and ASIP interceptor missile programs as well as radar testing.

== Operators ==
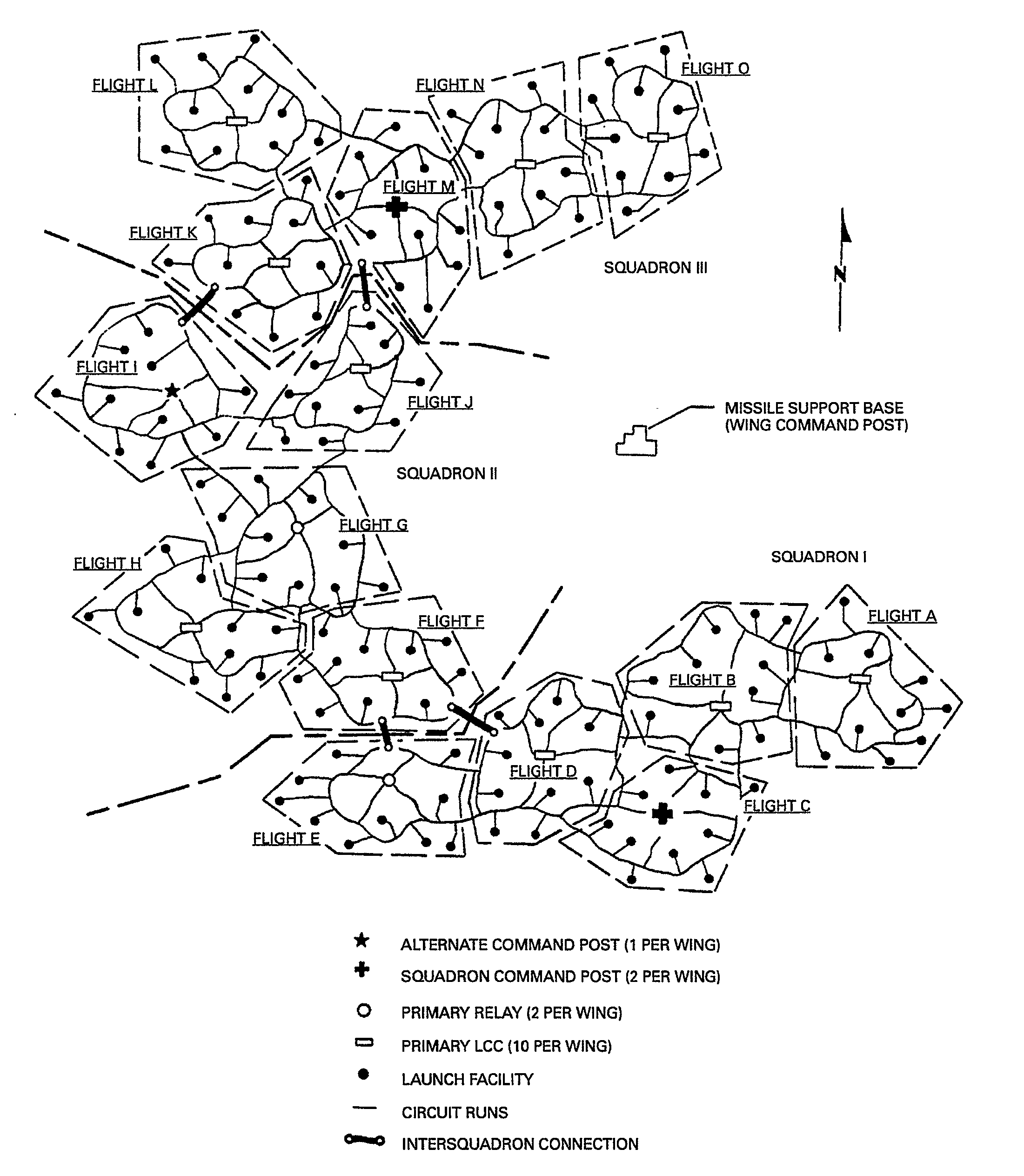
The connectivity of the 91st MW Missile Field

The United States Air Force has been the only operator of the Minuteman ICBM weapons system, currently with three operational wings and one test squadron operating the LGM-30G. The active inventory in FY 2025 is 400 missiles and 45 Missile Alert Facilities (MAF).

=== Operational units ===
The basic tactical unit of a Minuteman wing is the squadron, consisting of five flights. Each flight consists of ten unmanned launch facilities (LFs) which are remotely controlled by a manned launch control center (LCC). A two-officer crew is on duty in the LCC, typically for 24 hours. The five flights are interconnected and status from any LF may be monitored by any of the five LCCs. Each LF is located at least three nautical miles (5.6 km) from any LCC.

Control does not extend outside the squadron (thus the 319th Missile Squadron's five LCCs cannot control the 320th Missile Squadron's 50 LFs even though they are part of the same Missile Wing). Each Minuteman wing is assisted logistically by a nearby Missile Support Base (MSB). If the ground-based LCCs are destroyed or incapacitated, the Minuteman ICBMs can be launched by airborne missileers utilizing the Airborne Launch Control System.

==== Active ====
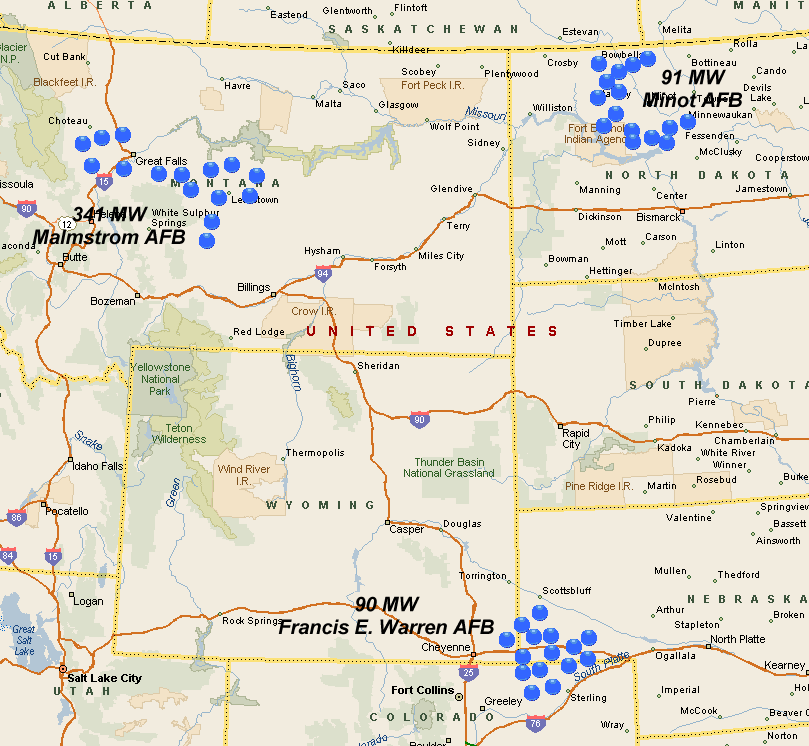
Active LGM-30 Minuteman deployments, 2010

- 90th Missile Wing – "Mighty Ninety"
  - at Francis E. Warren AFB, Wyoming, (1 July 1963 – present)
  - Units:
    - 319th Missile Squadron – "Screaming Eagles"
    - 320th Missile Squadron – "G.N.I."
    - 321st Missile Squadron – "Greentails"
  - 134 missiles, 15 MAF – Launch sites
    - LGM-30B Minuteman I, 1964–74
    - LGM-30G Minuteman III, 1973–present
- 91st Missile Wing – "Roughriders"
  - at Minot AFB, North Dakota (25 June 1968 – present)
  - Units:
    - 740th Missile Squadron – "Vulgar Vultures"
    - 741st Missile Squadron – "Gravelhaulers"
    - 742d Missile Squadron – "Wolf Pack"
  - 133 Missiles, 15 MAF – Launch sites
    - LGM-30B Minuteman I, 1968–72
    - LGM-30G Minuteman III, 1972–present
- 341st Missile Wing
  - at Malmstrom AFB, Montana (15 July 1961 – present)
  - Units:
    - 10th Missile Squadron – "First Aces"
    - 12th Missile Squadron – "Red Dawgs"
    - 490th Missile Squadron – "Farsiders"
  - 133 Missiles, 15 MAF – Launch sites
    - LGM-30A Minuteman I, 1962–69
    - LGM-30F Minuteman II, 1967–94
    - LGM-30G Minuteman III, 1975–present
- 625th Strategic Operations Squadron
  - at Offutt AFB, Nebraska

==== Historical ====
- 44th Strategic Missile (later Missile) Wing "Black Hills Bandits"

Ellsworth AFB, South Dakota (24 November 1961 – 5 July 1994)
LGM-30B Minuteman I, 1963–73
LGM-30F Minuteman II, 1971–94
66th Missile Squadron
67th Missile Squadron
68th Missile Squadron
44th Missile Wing LGM-30 Minuteman Missile Launch Sites
Inactivated 1994 when Minuteman II phased out of inventory. All retired between 3 December 1991 and April 1994, with destruction of silos and alert facilities finishing in 1996.

- 90th Missile Wing

400th Missile Squadron (Converted to LGM-118A Peacekeeper in 1987. Inactivated 2005. Peacekeepers retired.)

- 321st Strategic Missile (later Missile) Wing (later Group)

Grand Forks AFB, North Dakota (14 August 1964 – 30 September 1998)
LGM-30F Minuteman II, 1965–73
LGM-30G Minuteman III, 1972–98
446th Missile Squadron
447th Missile Squadron
448th Missile Squadron
321st Missile Wing LGM-30 Minuteman Missile Launch Sites
Inactivated by BRAC 1995; missiles reassigned to 341st SMW, however in 1995 it was decided to retire the Grand Forks missiles; the last missile was pulled from its silo in June 1998. Destruction of silos and control facilities began in October 1999; the last silo (H-22) was imploded 24 August 2001 (the last US silo destroyed per the 1991 START-I treaty).

- 341st Missile Wing

564th Missile Squadron (Inactivated 2008, WS-133B system retired, missiles recycled into inventory)

- 351st Strategic Missile (later Missile) Wing

Whiteman AFB, Missouri (1 February 1963 – 31 July 1995)
LGM-30B Minuteman I, 1963–65
LGM-30F Minuteman II, 1965–95
508th Missile Squadron
509th Missile Squadron
510th Missile Squadron
351st Missile Wing LGM-30 Minuteman Missile Launch Sites
The 510th SMS operated Emergency Rocket Communication System (ERCS) missiles in addition to Minuteman II ICBMs. The 351st SMW was inactivated under START-I. The first silo was imploded on 8 December 1993 and the last on 15 December 1997.

- 455th Strategic Missile Wing

Minot AFB, North Dakota (28 June 1962 – 25 June 1968)
LGM-30B Minuteman I, 1962–68
Replaced by the 91st Strategic Missile Wing in June 1968

- Historical Airborne Launch Control System Units

68th Strategic Missile Squadron (Ellsworth AFB, SD: 1967–1970)
91st Strategic Missile Wing (Minot AFB, ND: 1967–1969)
4th Airborne Command and Control Squadron (Ellsworth AFB, SD: 1970–1992)
2nd Airborne Command and Control Squadron (Offutt AFB, NE: 1970–1994)
7th Airborne Command and Control Squadron (Offutt AFB, NE: 1994–1998)
625th Missile Operations Flight/USSTRATCOM (Offutt AFB, NE: 1998–2007)
Converted to the 625th Strategic Operations Squadron in 2007, where ALCS mission continues to this day

==== Support ====
- 532d Training Squadron – Vandenberg AFB, California (Missile Maintenance Training and Missile Initial Qualification Course)
- 315th Weapons Squadron – Nellis AFB, Nevada (ICBM Weapons Instructor Course)
- 526th ICBM Systems Wing – Hill Air Force Base, Utah
- 576th Flight Test Squadron – Vandenberg Air Force Base, California – "Top Hand"
- 625th Strategic Operations Squadron – Offutt AFB, Nebraska

== Replacement ==
A request for proposal for development and maintenance of a Ground Based Strategic Deterrent (GBSD) next-generation nuclear ICBM, was made by the US Air Force Nuclear Weapons Center, ICBM Systems Directorate, GBSD Division on 29 July 2016. The GBSD would replace MMIII in the land-based portion of the US Nuclear Triad. The new missile to be phased in over a decade from the late 2020s are estimated over a fifty-year life cycle to cost around $86 billion. Boeing, Lockheed Martin, and Northrop Grumman were competing for the contract.

On 21 August 2017, the US Air Force awarded 3-year development contracts to Boeing and Northrop Grumman, for $349 million and $329 million, respectively. One of these companies will be selected to produce this ground-based nuclear ICBM in 2020. In 2027, the GBSD program is expected to enter service and remain active until 2075.

On 14 December 2019, it was announced that Northrop Grumman had won the competition to build the future ICBM. Northrop won by default, as their bid was at the time the only bid left to be considered for the GBSD program (Boeing had dropped out of the bidding contest earlier in 2019). The US Air Force stated that it would "proceed with an aggressive and effective sole-source negotiation."

== Surviving decommissioned sites ==
- Oscar One Alert Facility at Whiteman AFB
- Delta One Alert Facility at Minuteman Missile National Historic Site
- Delta Nine Silo at Minuteman Missile National Historic Site
- Minuteman II missile Training Launch Facility at Ellsworth AFB
- Oscar Zero Alert Facility at Ronald Reagan Minuteman Missile State Historic Site
- November 33 Silo (topside only) at Ronald Reagan Minuteman Missile State Historic Site
- Quebec-One Missile Alert Facility at Cheyenne, Wyoming (modified for Peacekeeper ICBM in 1986)

== Preservation ==
The Minuteman Missile National Historic Site in South Dakota preserves a Launch Control Facility (D-01) and a launch facility (D-09) under the control of the National Park Service. The North Dakota State Historical Society maintains the Ronald Reagan Minuteman Missile Site, preserving a Missile Alert Facility, Launch Control Center and Launch Facility in the WS-133B "Deuce" configuration, near Cooperstown, North Dakota.

== Comparable missiles ==
- Agni-VI – (India)
- DF-5 – (China)
- DF-31 – (China)
- DF-41 – (China)
- PGM-17 Thor – (United States)
- R-36 – (Soviet Union)
- RS-24 Yars – (Russia)
- RS-28 Sarmat – (Russia)
- RT-2 – (Soviet Union)
- RT-2PM2 Topol-M – (Russia)
- UR-100N – (Soviet Union)

== See also ==
- Airborne Launch Control Center
- LGM-30 Minuteman chronology
- Missile combat crew
- Missile launch control center
- Nuclear weapons and the United States
- Single Integrated Operational Plan
- List of missiles
