= HML =

HML may refer to:

- Hml (trigraph), used in Hmong
- Hard Mobile Launcher, a nuclear-hardened transporter erector launcher
- Hard money loan, a loan service used for real estate investors to flip homes
- Hemel Hempstead railway station, England, station code
- Hennessy–Milner logic, in computer science
- Hialeah-Miami Lakes High School in Florida, US
- Hindustan Motors, an Indian automotive manufacturer
- Horus-Maat Lodge, a Thelemic magical order
- Human Media Lab, in Kingston, Ontario, Canada
- Luopohe Hmong language, spoken in China
