= PIGA accelerometer =

Pendulous Integrating Gyroscopic Accelerometer, an inertial guidance instrument

A PIGA (Pendulous Integrating Gyroscopic Accelerometer) is a type of accelerometer that can measure acceleration and simultaneously integrates this acceleration against time to produce a speed measure as well. The PIGA's main use is in Inertial Navigation Systems (INS) for guidance of aircraft and most particularly for ballistic missile guidance. It is valued for its extremely high sensitivity and accuracy in conjunction with operation over a wide acceleration range. The PIGA is still considered the premier instrument for strategic grade missile guidance, though systems based on MEMS technology are attractive for lower performance requirements.

== Principle of operation ==
The sensing element of a PIGA is a pendulous mass, free to pivot by being mounted on a bearing. A spinning gyroscope is attached such that it would restrain the pendulum against "falling" in the direction of acceleration. The pendulous mass and its attached gyroscope are themselves mounted on a pedestal that can be rotated by an electric torque motor. The rotational axis of this pedestal is mutually orthogonal to the spin axis of the gyroscope as well as the axis that the pendulum is free to move in. The axis of rotation of this pedestal is also in the direction of the measured acceleration.

The position of the pendulum is sensed by precision electrical contacts or by optical or electromagnetic means. Should acceleration displace the pendulum arm from its null position the sensing mechanism will operate the torque motor and rotate the pedestal such that the property of gyroscopic precession restores the pendulum to its null position. The rate of rotation of the pedestal gives the acceleration while the total number of rotations of the shaft gives the speed, hence the term "integrating" in the PIGA acronym. A further level of integration of shaft rotations by either electronic means or by mechanical means, such as a Ball-and-disk integrator, can record the displacement or distance traveled, this latter mechanical method being used by early guidance systems prior to the availability of suitable digital computers.

In most implementations of the PIGA the gyroscope itself is cantilevered on the end of the pendulum arm to act as the pendulous mass itself. Up to three such instruments may be required for each dimension of an INS with the three accelerometers mounted orthogonally generally on a platform stabilized gyroscopically within a system of gimbals.

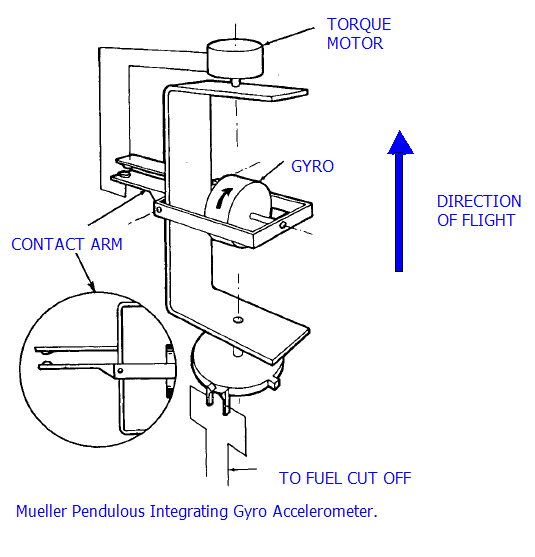

A critical requirement for accuracy is low static friction (stiction) in the bearings of the pendulum; this is achieved by various means ranging from double ball bearing with a superimposed oscillatory motion to dither the bearing above its threshold or through the use of gaseous or fluid bearings or by the alternative method of floating the gyroscope in a fluid and restraining the residual mass by jewel bearings or electromagnetic means. Although this later method still has the viscous friction of the fluid this is linear and has no threshold and has the advantage of having minimal static friction. Another aspect is the accurate control of the gyroscope's rotational rate.

Missiles/rockets using PIGAs were the Redstone, Jupiter, Saturn V, Titan, Polaris, Minuteman, Peacekeeper, and Trident II (D5).

== History ==
The PIGA was based on an accelerometer developed by Dr. Fritz Mueller, then of the Kreiselgeraete Company, for the LEV-3 and experimental SG-66 guidance system of the Nazi era German V2 (EMW A4) ballistic missile and was known among the German rocket scientists as the MMIA "Mueller Mechanical Integrating Accelerometer". This system used precision electrical contacts to actuate the torque motor and achieved an accuracy of 1 part in 1000 to 1 part per 10000 (known in technical parlance as a scale error of 1000 to 100). This was equivalent to about 600 m of accuracy over the V2 1500 m/s speed and 320 km flight. Since the number of shaft rotations represented speed, a cam switch was used to initiate missile control sequences such as engine throttle-down and shut-off.

A recovered MMIA accelerometer from an unexploded V2 was presented to Dr Charles Stark Draper of the Massachusetts Institute of Technology's instrumentation lab who had been developing the basis of inertial navigation for aircraft by initially concentrating efforts on achieving extremely low drift rate gyroscopes known as a floated integrating gyroscope. Draper combined ideas from his integrating gyroscopes, which were mounted in cans that floated in fluids that were held in place by jeweled bearings, with the recovered V2 accelerometer by floating the pendulum-gyroscope portion. The more generic name of PIGA was suggested by Dr. Draper due to the addition of various refinements such as electromagnetic or optical sensing of pendulum position. Such accelerometers were used in the Titan II, Polaris and Minuteman ICBM systems.

PIGA accelerometers mounted in the AIRS (Advanced Inertial Reference Sphere) are part of the most accurate inertial navigation (INS) developed for the Peacekeeper missile. The INS drift rates are less than 1.5 × 10^{−5} degrees per hour of operation, about 8.5 m per hour with the overall accuracy of the missile affected more by defects in the gravitational maps.

At the Redstone Arsenal and the adjoining Marshall Space Flight Center, near Huntsville, Alabama, the contingent of ex-German rocket scientists which had been brought into the United States under Operation Paperclip, including Dr. Mueller, continued to refine their original instruments in conjunction with American engineers and scientists. At the suggestion of Dr. Mueller, the technically difficult task of replacing the original ball bearings with gaseous bearings was achieved. Initially, compressed nitrogen was used but later fluorocarbons which had the advantage of being recyclable on board the missile or aircraft during extended waiting periods was used. Hence US accelerometers either consisted of the floating type or the gaseous bearing type with the US Army and US space program relying on the latter type of instrument.

== General references ==
- "Developments in the Field of Automatic Guidance and Control of Rockets", Walter Haeussermann, The Bendix Corporation, Huntsville, Ala. VOL. 4, NO. 3 J. GUIDANCE AND CONTROL MAY-JUNE 1981, History of Key Technologies AIAA 81-4120. From AIAA American Institute for Aeronautics & Astronautics Digital Library
- AIAA 2001-4288, "The Pendulous Integrating Gyroscope Accelerometer (PIGA) from the V-2 to Trident D5, the Strategic Instrument of Choice", R.E. Hopkins The Charles Stark Draper Laboratory, Inc. Cambridge, MA, Dr. Fritz K. Mueller, Dr. Walter Haeussermann, Huntsville, AL, Guidance, Navigation, and Control Conference & Exhibit, 6-9 August 2001 Montreal, Canada. From AIAA American Institute for Aeronautics & Astronautics Digital Library
- MacKenzie, Donald (1990). Inventing Accuracy: An Historical Sociology of Nuclear Missile Guidance. MIT Press.
