= STRAT-X =

U.S. government-sponsored study

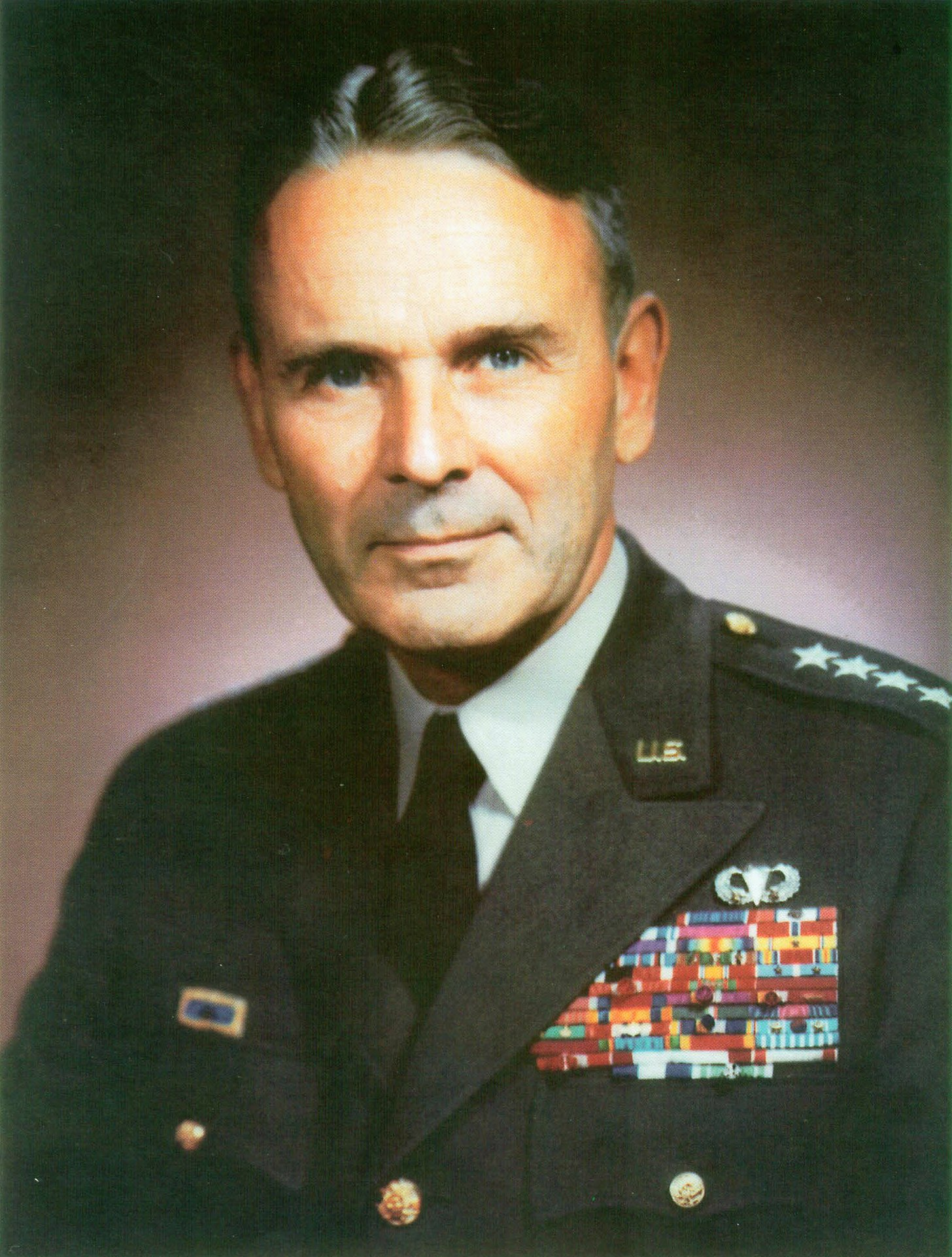
- STRAT-X was presided by retired General Maxwell D. Taylor.
- Date: 1 November 1966 – August 1967
- Also known as: Strategic-Experimental
- Participants: U.S. Department of Defense; Institute for Defense Analyses; U.S. Armed Forces; Military contractors
- Outcome: Implementation of several military concepts

STRAT-X, or Strategic-Experimental, was a U.S. government-sponsored study conducted during 1966 and 1967 that comprehensively analyzed the potential future of the U.S. nuclear deterrent force. At the time, the Soviet Union was making significant strides in nuclear weapons delivery, and also constructing anti-ballistic missile defenses to protect strategic facilities. To address a potential technological gap between the two superpowers, U.S. Secretary of Defense Robert McNamara entrusted the classified STRAT-X study to the Institute for Defense Analyses, which compiled a twenty-volume report in nine months. The report looked into more than one hundred different weapons systems, ultimately resulting in the MGM-134 Midgetman and LGM-118 Peacekeeper intercontinental ballistic missiles, the Ohio-class submarines, and the Trident submarine-launched ballistic missiles, among others. Journalists have regarded STRAT-X as a major influence on the course of U.S. nuclear policy.

== Background ==
In the mid-1960s, reports received by U.S. intelligence agencies indicated that the Soviets were planning to deploy large numbers of highly accurate and powerful intercontinental ballistic missiles (ICBMs). Later, the R-36 ICBM entered service. Possessing the greatest throw weight of any ICBM ever at 8.8 tonnes (19,000 lb), the R-36 was larger than the most modern ICBMs in the U.S. arsenal at the time. Due to its size, it was able to carry high-yield warheads capable of destroying Minuteman hardened silos (see Counterforce). This was considered a significant risk to American ICBMs and, as a result, to the United States' nuclear defense strategy by reducing the United States' ability to retaliate with nuclear weapons if attacked. (Note: "First, increasingly numerous ICBMs posed a threat to America's own weapons.")

At the same time, the Soviets were designing and constructing increasingly sophisticated anti-ballistic missile defense systems to protect strategically important facilities around Moscow, reducing the threat posed by American ICBMs. These developments compelled the U.S. Secretary of Defense, Robert McNamara, to commission a study to look into ways of improving the survivability of the U.S. nuclear arsenal. (Note: "The survivability of U.S. missiles from a Soviet first-strike attack was given particular consideration by the Strat-X participants ...")

According to Graham Spinardi in his book From Polaris to Trident (1994), STRAT-X was a response by the U.S. Department of Defense's Deputy Director of Defense Research and Engineering, Lloyd Wilson, to the U.S. Air Force; the service was demanding a large ICBM called the WS-120A. Spinardi suggests that STRAT-X was allowed to proceed so it could terminate the study for such a missile. Funding for the WS-120A would not be released by Secretary McNamara, and plans for such a missile were canceled in 1967.

== Study ==
The study was named "STRAT-X" in order not to reveal its intentions, and also to eliminate partiality towards sea-, air- or land-based systems. It was conducted by the Research and Engineering Support Division of the independent and non-profit Institute for Defense Analyses (IDA), which had conducted a study in early 1966 titled "Pen-X", upon which STRAT-X was based. STRAT-X was chaired by President of the IDA, retired General Maxwell D. Taylor, while the institution's Fred Payne presided over STRAT-X's "working" panel. The panel also included executives from major independent corporations and defense contractors such as Boeing, Booz Allen Hamilton, Thiokol and TRW. The Advisory Committee members were mostly military officers, including U.S. Navy Rear Admirals George H. Miller and Levering Smith.

"The systems to be analyzed need not be limited to those recommended by the services, and the STRAT-X study group is encouraged to examine system concepts unrestrained by considerations of potential management problems or political influences."

— Extract from a memo from the Director of Defense Research and Engineering to the IDA

On 1 November 1966, McNamara signed an order authorizing STRAT-X, officially initiating the study. During STRAT-X, the working panel was "encouraged to examine system concepts unrestrained by considerations of potential management problems or political influences." The Secretary wanted new ideas about "path-breaking" weapons systems that were either offensive or defensive in nature, unhindered by defense bureaucracy, which had the potential to stifle innovation. Sea-, land- and air-based missile systems were investigated, but crewed bombers and orbital systems were not. The group was also asked to consider the cost effectiveness of all systems, as well to predict possible Soviet responses. To meet this requirement, a series of documents were written from the perspective of the Soviet Minister of Defense General Andrei Grechko, complete with anti-capitalistic statements and a prediction of the eventual triumph of socialism. In the end, a twenty-volume report covered no fewer than 125 different ideas for missile systems, nine of which were reviewed in great detail.

=== Findings and consequences ===
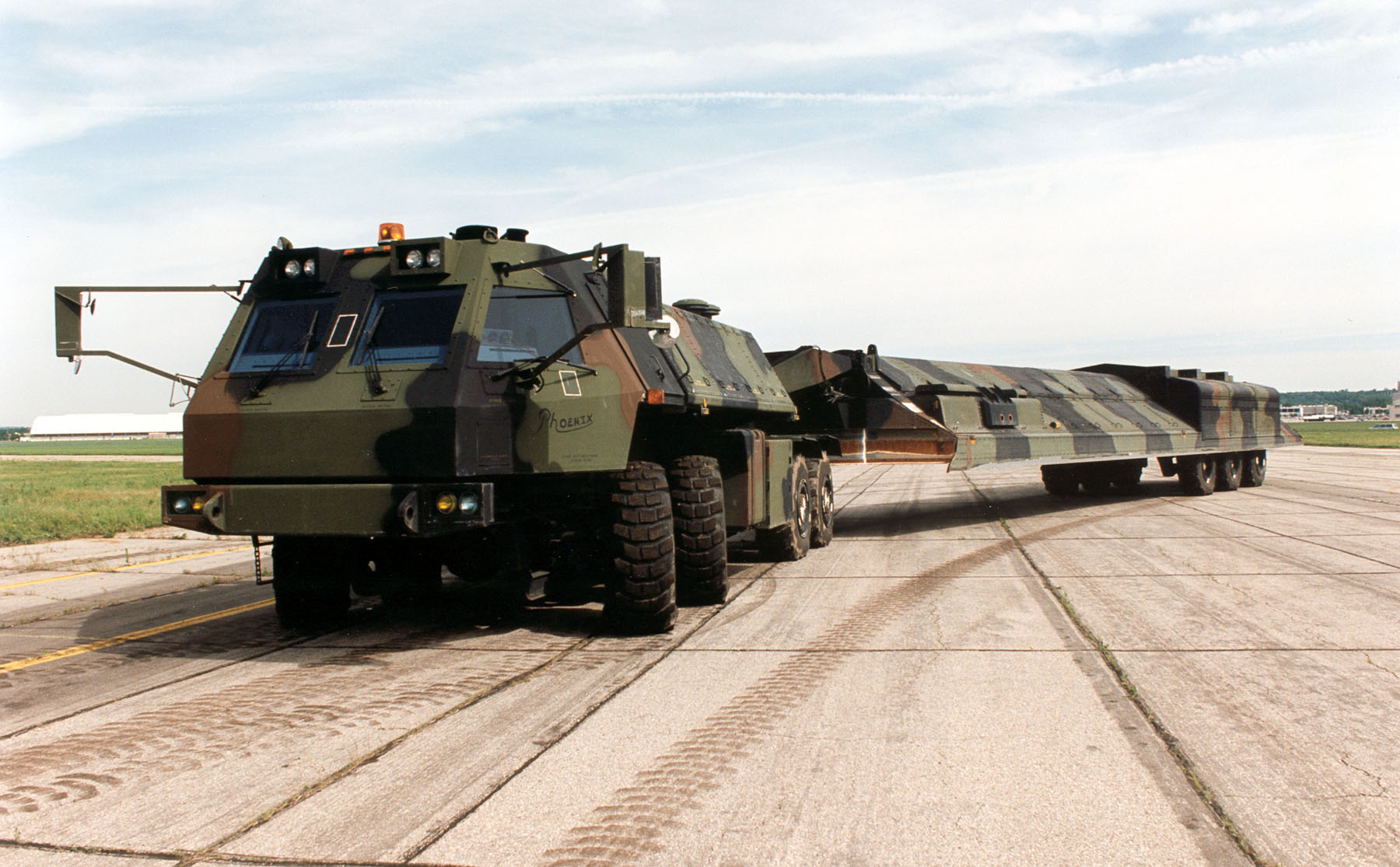
A Hard Mobile Launcher that was designed to carry the MGM-134 Midgetman missile

Of the nine prospective weapons systems, five were land-based. These were: "Rock Silo"—a system where missiles would be stored in hardened silos of granite bedrock in the Western and Northern United States; "Soft Silo"—a similar system but with easily and cheaply constructed silos; "Rock Tunnel"—a system where missiles would be transported around in deep underground networks before emerging at launch points; "Soft Tunnel"—a similar tunnel but built more cheaply and easily; and "Land Mobile"—a truck-based system where road-transporters traveled at speeds up to 35 miles per hour (56 km/h) constantly around a dedicated and winding road system in 65,000 square miles (170,000 km^{2}) of public land.

Of the remaining four, three were sea-based. These were: "Canal-Based"—a systems where missiles would be sailed in canals to confuse Soviet military planners; "Ship-Based"—a system where ships carrying missile canisters would travel around the world, hiding among other traffic; and "Submarine-Based"—a system where ballistic missile submarines would roam the oceans while carrying missile canisters outside their pressure hulls. The single air-based consideration was the "Air Launched ICBM", which required large aircraft carrying standoff ballistic missiles to launch their payloads at the Soviet Union.

Despite the numerous options investigated during the study, none were fully implemented. Although the STRAT-X "Land Mobile" option resulted in the MGM-134 Midgetman and LGM-118 Peacekeeper missiles, the fall of communism throughout the late 1980s and early 1990s resulted in the Midgetman being canceled while still a prototype, (Note: "The [MGM-134 Midgetman] missile was canceled in 1992, following the collapse of the Berlin Wall and the end of the Cold War.") while only 50 out of the original 100 Peacekeeper missiles were ever fielded. Nevertheless, the study did inspire a number of developments in nuclear weapons delivery systems. In October 1974, the U.S. Air Force successfully conducted an air launch of a Minuteman missile from a C-5 Galaxy, demonstrating the credibility of the "Air Launched ICBM" option of STRAT-X.

Although the U.S. Navy then had several classes of ballistic missile submarines and submarine-launched ballistic missile (SLBM) in service, the study placed a significant emphasis on the survivability of SLBMs. This resulted in the enormous Ohio-class submarine and the Trident SLBMs which the Ohio class carried. The study originally called for dedicated slow-moving missile-carrying submarines (instead of converted attack submarines) to embark missiles outside their hulls and rely primarily on stealth for survivability. However, Admiral Hyman Rickover, director of the Naval Reactors office, wanted a boat capable of a burst of high speed in order to affect a safe "getaway" after launching the boat's payload. As a result, the Ohio class was designed to accommodate enormous nuclear reactors to produce the required speed. Ohio-class submarines carry their missiles inside of their hulls, despite STRAT-X's recommendation. Ohio-class submarines and Trident missiles are still in service as of 2026.

Weapons systems inspired by STRAT-X

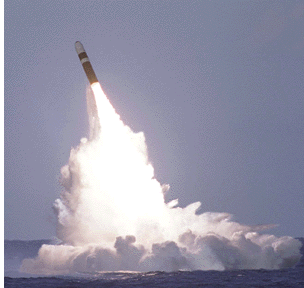
A Trident II submarine-launched ballistic missile firing its rocket motors after emerging from the ocean.

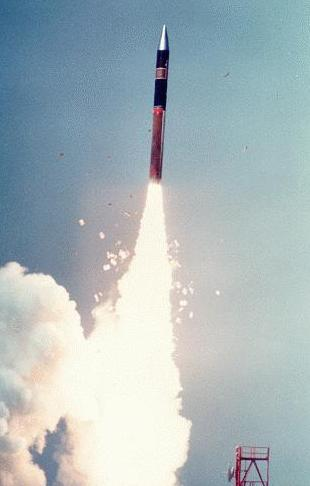
An MGM-134 Midgetman intercontinental ballistic missile shortly after launch.

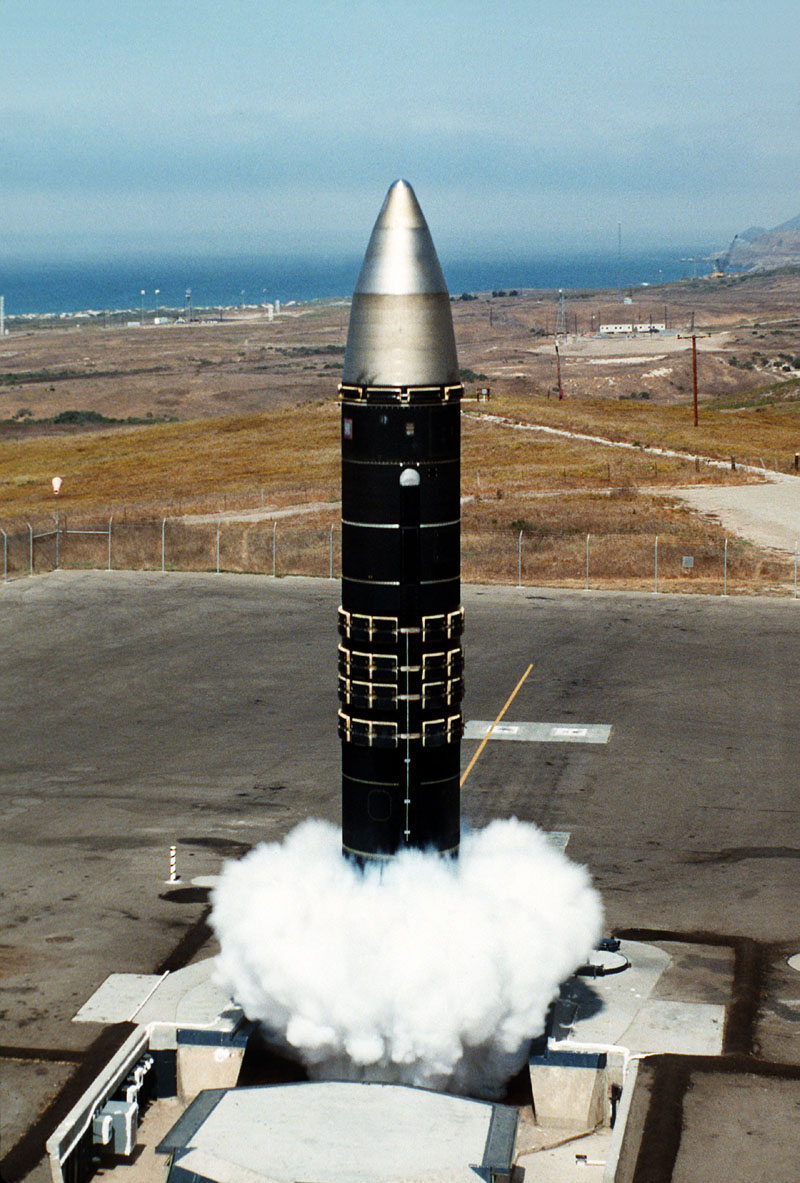
An LGM-118 Peacekeeper missile leaving its hardened silo.

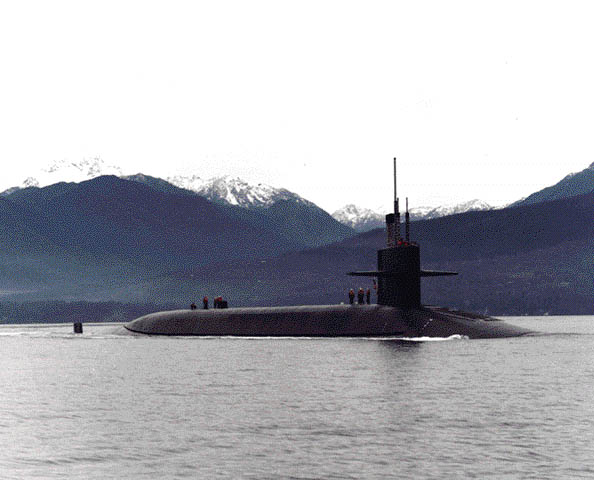
USS Henry M. Jackson (SSBN-730), one of the eighteen Ohio-class boats constructed

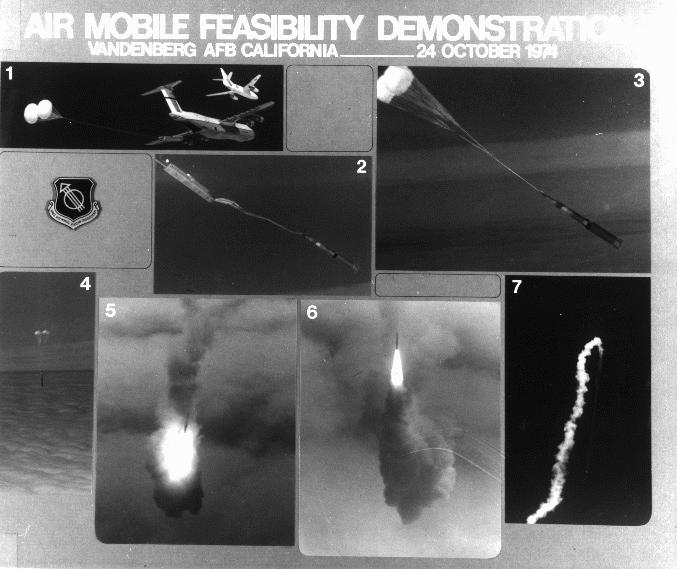
A Minuteman III Air Launched ICBM test launch from a C-5 Galaxy in October 1974.

== Legacy ==
STRAT-X had far-reaching effects on the development and deployment of U.S. nuclear forces. It was the first time that the strategic requirements of the U.S. Armed Forces were addressed in a detailed and analytical manner. In a 2002 report by the RAND Corporation, STRAT-X was described as "one of the most influential analyses ever conducted" for the U.S. Department of Defense. Journalist Peter Grier, in his Air Force magazine article "STRAT-X", described the study as "a wide-ranging look at the future of U.S. weapons that shaped the nuclear triad for decades, and remains a model for such efforts today". In 2006, the Defense Science Board (DFS) noted STRAT-X's introduction of ideas and concepts that resulted in the Ohio-class submarines and small and mobile ICBMs. The DFS also attributed the use of air-launched cruise missiles, particularly those carried by the B-52 Stratofortress, to STRAT-X despite their lack of references in the study.

== Footnotes ==
Notes

Bibliography

- Clearwater, M. John (1996). Johnson, McNamara, and the Birth of SALT and the ABM Treaty 1963–1969. St Leonards, New South Wales: Universal-Publishers. ISBN 1-58112-062-1.
- Grier, Peter (January 2010). "STRAT-X" (PDF). Air Force Magazine. Vol. 93, no. 1. ISSN 0730-6784. OCLC 5169825. Archived (PDF) from the original on 6 January 2026.
- Polmar, Norman; Moore, Kenneth J. (2004). "The Ultimate Weapon II". Cold War Submarines: The Design and Construction of U.S. and Soviet Submarines. Dulles, Virginia: Potomac Books. ISBN 1-57488-594-4.
- Spinardi, Graham (1994). "STRAT-X, ULMS, and Trident I". From Polaris to Trident: The Development of US Fleet Ballistic Missile Technology. Cambridge, United Kingdom: Cambridge University Press. ISBN 0-521-41357-5.
