= Fritz Mueller =

German-American engineer

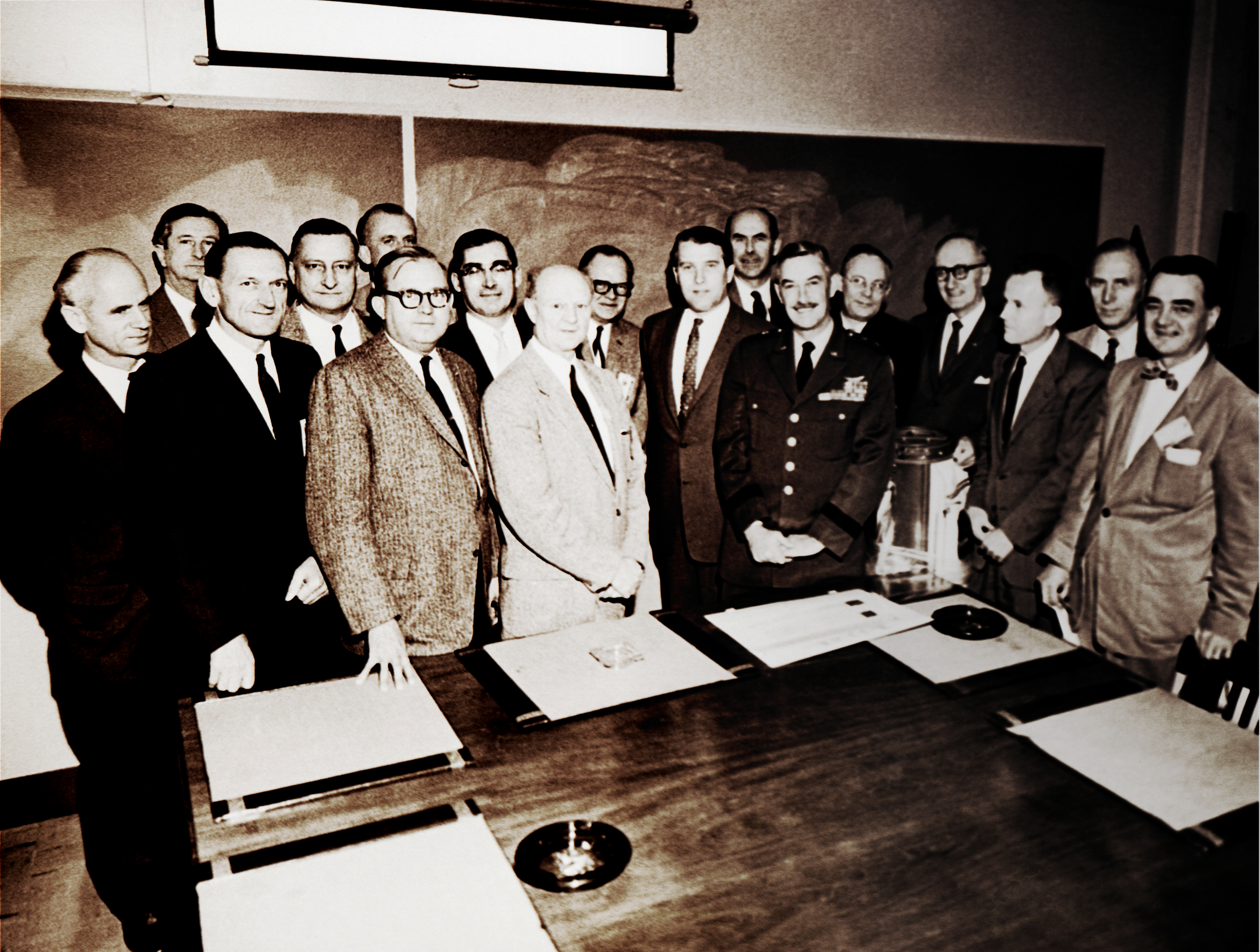

Fritz K. Mueller (1907 – 2001 Huntsville, Alabama, USA) was a German-American engineer.

Mueller was hired by Kreiselgeräte Company in 1930. He developed the PIGA accelerometer. and worked on gyroscopes for Nazi Germany's Kriegsmarine. Later on, he worked on the guidance and control system for the A3 test rocket, the A5, and the A4 (V2) ballistic missile.

Under Project Paperclip, Mueller emigrated to the United States on 16 November 1945 with the Argentina group. There, he worked on developing guidance systems for the PGM-11 Redstone, PGM-19 Jupiter, MGM-31 Pershing, and the Saturn I missiles. In 1960 Mueller left NASA for private industry.
