= Advanced Inertial Reference Sphere =

Inertial navigation system

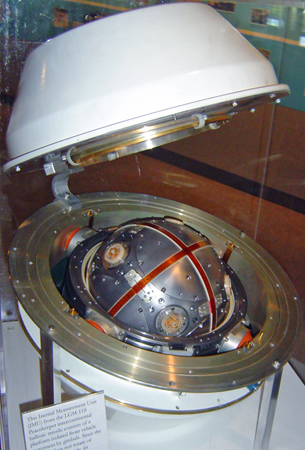
Advanced Inertial Reference Sphere

The Advanced Inertial Reference Sphere (AIRS) is a highly accurate inertial navigation system designed for use in the LGM-118 Peacekeeper ICBM, which was intended for precision nuclear strikes against Soviet missile silos.

== Details ==
AIRS is a fluid-suspended gyrostabilized platform system, as opposed to one using a gimballed gyrostabilized platform. It consists of a beryllium sphere floating in fluid. Jet nozzles are used to stabilize the inertial platform as commanded from the sensors to increase accuracy. This design not only eliminates the problem of gimbal lock, but also makes it extremely accurate (drift less than 1.5×10^{−5} °/h), to the point that any further improvement would give a negligible benefit to the missile's CEP.

The sensors used in AIRS are 3 floated gas bearing gyroscopes and 3 specific force integrating receivers (SFIR) accelerometers, which are derivatives of PIGA accelerometers. Although this type of accelerometer is most accurate, it contains many precise parts, making it very expensive to build (approximately $6,000,000 per AIRS unit in 1987, not including development costs). PIGA/SFIR accelerometers are also very susceptible to failure due to the complex design.

== Usage ==
The AIRS was originally developed for the LGM-118A Peacekeeper. The first AIRS units were manufactured by Northrop.
