= BGM-75 AICBM =

ZBGM-75
- Type: Intercontinental ballistic missile
- Place of origin: United States

Service history
- Used by: United States Air Force

Production history
- No. built: 0

Specifications
- Warhead: 10–20 MIRV
- Engine: Solid fuel rocket
- Guidance system: Inertial
- Launch platform: Silos, railway

The ZBGM-75 Advanced Intercontinental Ballistic Missile, also known as Weapons System 120A (WS-120A), was a program to develop an intercontinental ballistic missile (ICBM), proposed by the United States Air Force in the 1960s as a replacement for the LGM-30 Minuteman as the Air Force's standard ICBM. Funding was not allocated for the program and the project was cancelled in 1967.

== Background ==
The Department of Defense began the STRAT-X study on 1 November 1966 to evaluate a new ballistic missile proposal from the Air Force, which was designated the Advanced Intercontinental Ballistic Missile (AICBM). The project was intended to provide a successor to the LGM-30 Minuteman ICBM then in United States Air Force service. The program was officially launched in April 1966, and in June the project received the designation ZBGM-75, the "Z" prefix indicating a project in the planning stage.

The specifications for the ZBGM-75 called for a large solid-fuel-powered missile, which would be fitted with between 10 and 20 multiple independently targetable reentry vehicles (MIRVs). The missiles would be based in silo launchers, which were specified to be hardened by a factor of 10 over the existing silos used by Minuteman missiles. In addition, there was also a plan to develop a railroad-based deployment system for the AICBM. Improvements in accuracy over existing missiles, combined with penetration aids under development to enhance the effectiveness of each missile, were expected to make the AICBM capable of defeating existing and projected Soviet anti-ballistic missile systems.

== Cancellation ==
Ultimately, the Navy won the STRAT-X competition with the design that would become the Ohio-class ballistic missile submarines. Nevertheless, the final report, issued in August 1967, recommended that the ZBGM-75 also be developed. Accordingly, the Joint Chiefs of Staff recommended to Secretary of Defense Robert McNamara that the ZBGM-75 be funded starting in Fiscal Year (FY) 1969, with a projected entry into service by 1973. This recommendation came after the Air Force had completed the preliminary studies on the missiles and the new, hardened silos. McNamara instead kept the missile in "advanced development", which stopped all work on the project. Only development of the new super-hardened silos was approved for funding; these would be used by the Minuteman missiles. As a result, the missile's development was cancelled. McNamara's rationale for cancelling the program was the destabilizing influence of the new missile, which could have rendered existing Soviet anti-ballistic missile defenses ineffective. McNamara saw relative parity between the two powers—the strategic basis for mutually assured destruction—as the best method to keep the Soviet Union in a position where it must negotiate with the United States.

After the cancellation of WS-120A, the Air Force made no further development of new ICBMs until 1972. In that year the MX project was begun, which resulted in the development of the LGM-118 Peacekeeper. The Peacekeeper entered service in the mid-1980s and served until 2005; the Minuteman III is still in service, and has outlasted both of its planned replacements.

== See also ==
- BGM-109G Ground Launched Cruise Missile
