= LGM-118 Peacekeeper =

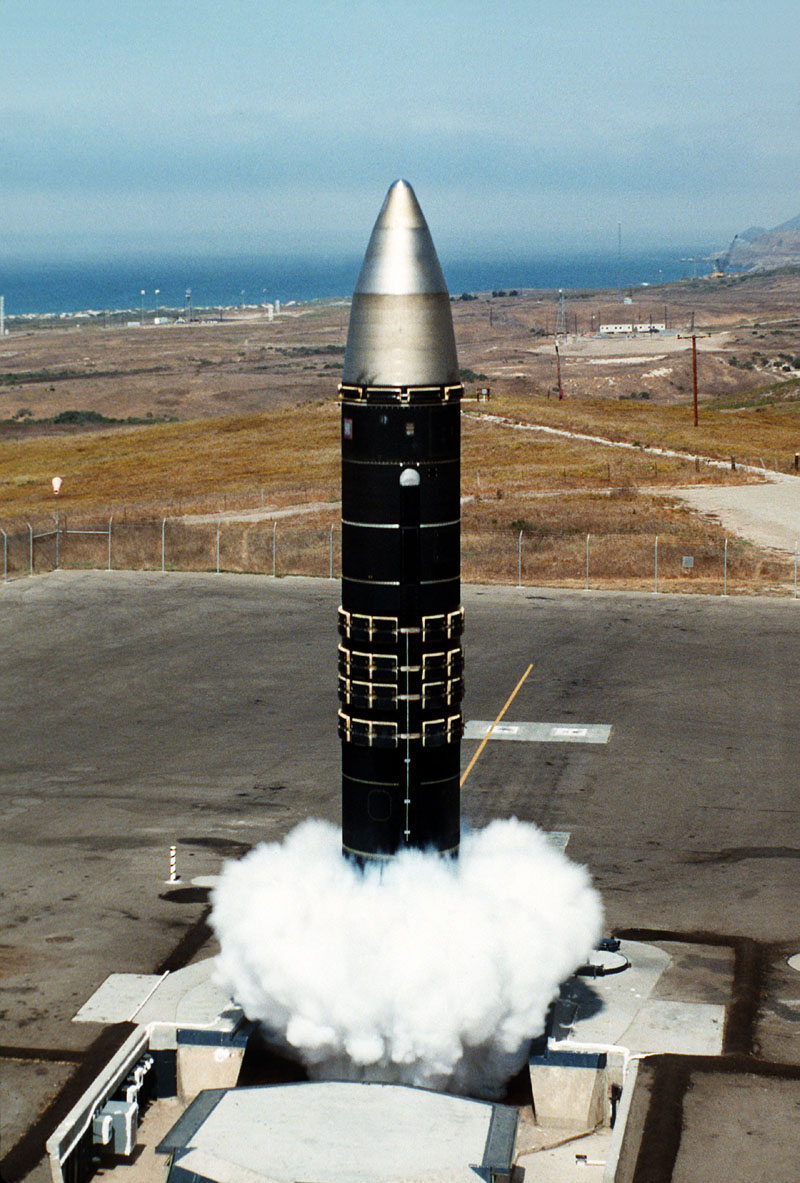
- Test launch of a Peacekeeper ICBM from a modified Minuteman III Silo, by the 6595th Missile Test Group, Space and Missile Test Organization (SAMTO), Ballistic Missile Office (BMO), Vandenberg AFB, CA (USAF)
- Type: Intercontinental ballistic missile
- Place of origin: United States

Service history
- In service: December 1986 — 12 September 2005
- Used by: United States Air Force

Production history
- Manufacturer: Boeing; Martin Marietta; TRW; Denver Aerospace
- Unit cost: US$70,000,000 (equivalent to $205,601,093 in 2025)

Specifications
- Mass: 87,750 kg (193,460 lb)
- Length: 21.8 m (72 ft)
- Diameter: 2.34 m (7.7 ft)
- Warhead: Up to 11 Avco Mk21 re-entry vehicles each carrying a 300 kt W87-0 warhead (though in practice, only 10 were carried); or 12 GE Mk12A re-entry vehicles each carrying a 335–350 kt W78 warhead (never deployed) plus decoys
- Detonation mechanism: Ground-burst and/or air-burst fusing modes
- Engine: Three-stage solid-fuel rocket; First stage: Thiokol SR118 solid-fuel rocket motor; Second stage: Aerojet General SR119 solid-fuel rocket motor; Third stage: Hercules SR120 solid-fuel rocket motor; Post-boost vehicle: Rocketdyne restartable liquid-propellant rocket motor; storable hypergolic fuel; First stage: 500,000 pounds-force (2.2 MN)
- Operational range: 6,000 mi (9,600 km)-8,700 mi (14,000 km)
- Maximum speed: Approximately 15,000 miles per hour (Mach 20; 24,000 km/h) at burnout
- Guidance system: Inertial (AIRS)
- Accuracy: 130 ft (40 m)-300 ft (90 m) CEP
- Launch platform: Fixed silo

The LGM-118 Peacekeeper, originally known as the MX for "Missile, Experimental", was a MIRV-capable intercontinental ballistic missile (ICBM) produced and deployed by the United States from 1986 to 2005. The missile could carry up to eleven Mark 21 reentry vehicles (although treaties limited its actual payload to ten), each armed with a 300-kiloton W87 warhead. Plans called for building and deploying up to 200 MX ICBMs, but budgetary and political concerns limited the final procurement, and only 50 entered service. Disarmament treaties signed after the Peacekeeper's development led to its withdrawal from service in 2005.

Studies of the underlying concept began in the 1960s. The goal was to enable the United States to absorb a surprise attack by the USSR while retaining enough surviving warheads to strike the remaining Soviet missile silos. To achieve this, the missiles had to be highly accurate, deployed in a manner that would allow enough of them to survive a nuclear attack, carry enough warheads to inflict massive damage even after suffering losses, and be capable of rapid retargeting so they could be aimed only at missiles the Soviets had not yet launched. Throughout its development in the 1970s, the MX evolved into a highly accurate, rapid-firing, and rapidly retargetable system. Ultimately, the only problem that was never fully resolved was its basing.

Initial development began in 1971, with full-scale development starting in 1974. President Jimmy Carter ordered initial production in 1979 but was overturned by Congress. After considerable debate about the system, in October 1982, President Ronald Reagan announced that 50 of the newly named Peacekeepers would be put into service in existing LGM-30 Minuteman silos, a temporary measure until final basing was decided. The first flight test took place in 1983, which included the successful launch of six inert re-entry vehicles, each hitting pre-planned targets. It was the first U.S. ICBM to use a cold launch system.

Peacekeeper reached initial operational capability in 1986. At this time, the United States and the Soviet Union were negotiating the START II treaty, under which ICBMs were allowed to carry only a single warhead each. Because the Minuteman could carry a single warhead for far less money, the United States agreed to remove the Peacekeeper from their nuclear force in this treaty. Despite the U.S. withdrawal from the Anti-Ballistic Missile Treaty and the subsequent Russian withdrawal from the START II on 14 June 2002, the last Peacekeeper missile was deactivated on 19 September 2005. Their advanced W87 warheads were moved to the Minuteman III.

The private launch firm Orbital Sciences Corporation has developed the Minotaur IV, a four-stage civilian expendable launch system using old Peacekeeper components. As of 2020, seven Minotaur IV flights have been made.

== Development and deployment ==
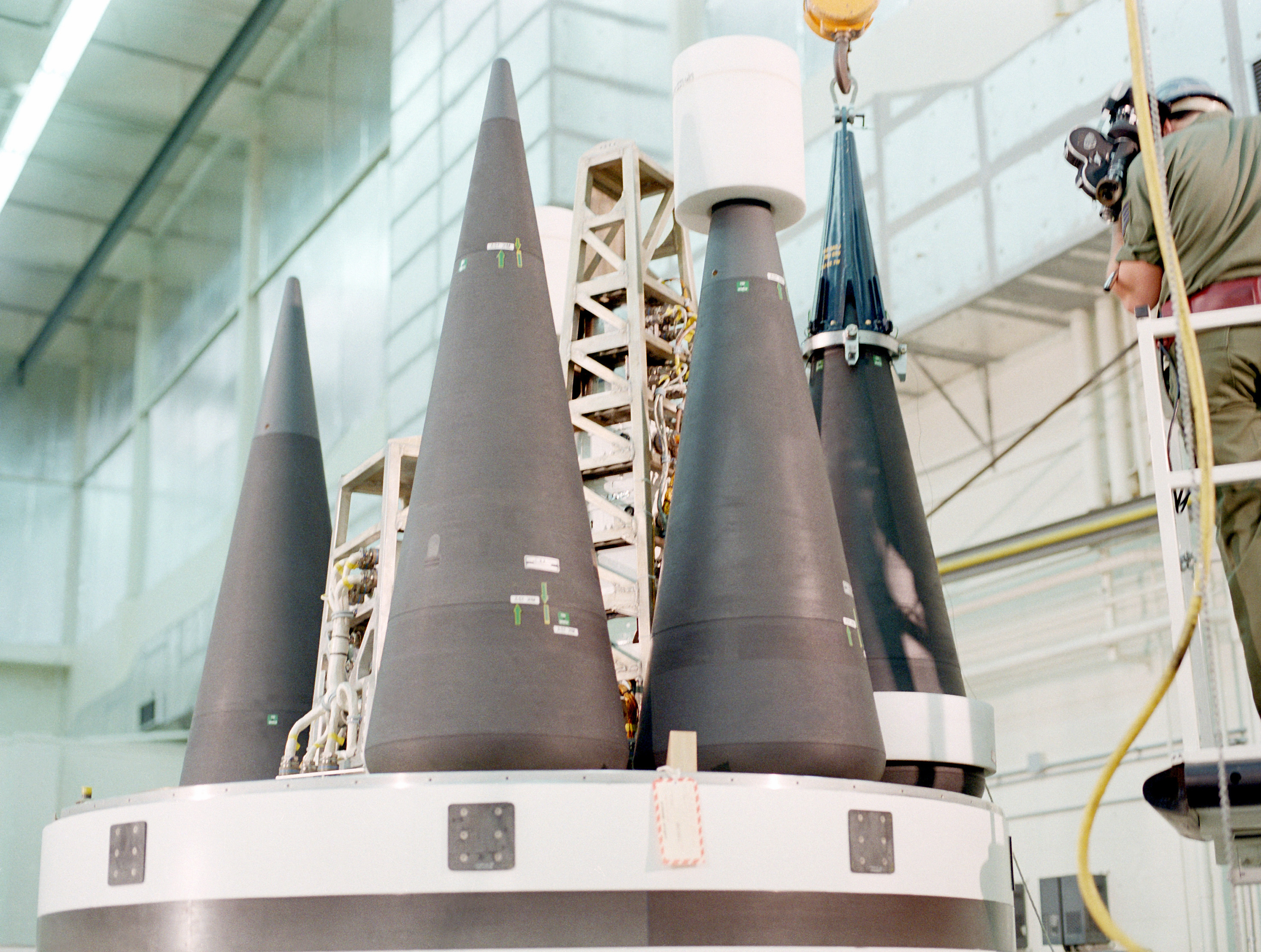
Mk12A re-entry vehicles on a Peacekeeper MIRV bus. Each carries a 335 kt W78 warhead with about 20 times the power of the bomb dropped on Hiroshima during World War II.

=== Minuteman ===
Deployment of the Minuteman ICBM began in 1962, during the Cold War, and proceeded rapidly. Limited accuracy with a circular error probable (CEP) of about 0.6 to 0.8 nautical miles (1.1 to 1.5 km) and a small warhead of less than 1 megaton meant the system was unable to attack hardened targets like missile silos. This limited these early models to attacks on strategic targets like cities and ports, and the system had little or no capability as a counterforce weapon. The Air Force relied on its crewed bombers as the primary weapon for attacking hardened targets and saw the ICBM as a survivable deterrent that would guard against an attack on its bomber fleet.

Soviet missiles were known to have very low accuracy, far too low to directly attack U.S. missile silos. They did have the combination of accuracy and power to attack the U.S. bomber bases. Although it would be very difficult to arrange, there was the possibility that a combination of missile attacks on U.S. bomber bases combined with bomber attacks on the missile bases would leave the U.S. at a disadvantage. The survivability of the missile fleet became increasingly important, especially after the Kennedy administration took power, and the new Secretary of Defense, Robert McNamara, was given the task of making the U.S. military the most powerful in the world while at the same time reducing its expenditures. He solved this problem by greatly reducing reliance on bombers, and by 1964, there were more U.S. ICBMs than bombers on nuclear alert.

By the mid-1960s, the missile had become the main U.S. strategic weapon. This led to concerns about various warfighting scenarios, especially as the Soviets improved their missiles. In the event of a Soviet missile launch, the U.S. faced the difficult decision of whether to fire their missiles immediately or wait to determine the targets of the Soviet missiles. Firing early might mean striking civilian targets (countervalue) when the Soviets had only targeted military installations, something U.S. politicians considered to be a serious problem (part of the flexible response doctrine). Even if the Soviets attacked only the bombers, the U.S. would be left with no counterforce approach, as both the Navy and Air Force missiles could only attack large targets.

As the U.S. Navy was quick to point out, their Polaris fleet's stealth and mobility would maintain a countervalue force under any possible scenario. This threatened the Air Force's supremacy in the nuclear warfighting arena. Even in the case of a counterforce attack, their bombers would take hours to complete their missions, during which the Soviets could launch their remaining missiles. The Air Force could not let this stand, and following the advice of RAND Corporation, in 1962 they decided the solution was to make the Minuteman capable of counterforce missions as well. The changes to Minuteman II were two-fold. One was to introduce the NS-17 inertial navigation system, which improved the CEP to 0.34 nautical miles (0.63 km) and allowed the missiles to attack Soviet silos directly. The other was to allow the missiles to quickly switch between a selection of eight targets, allowing them to be fired at only those Soviet silos that had not already launched.

=== Golden Arrow ===
Similar improvements to Soviet missiles, real or imagined, led to U.S. officials proposing a worrying scenario; a Soviet first strike with a limited number of warheads aimed at the Minuteman silos or control bunkers could cripple the U.S. ICBM fleet. At the time, the Soviets were only capable of mounting a limited attack. With the limited accuracy of Soviet missiles, only an attack with a small number of missiles carrying very large warheads (multi-megaton range) was feasible. They had just enough of these to make a damaging, but not decisive, attack on the U.S. ICBM fleet. This scenario was of deep concern to the Air Force as it became ever more dependent on Minuteman for most strategic missions.

The Air Force had depended on engineering support from TRW during the early days of the development of their ICBM force. In 1960 a number of TRW and other engineers involved in the ICBM program formed The Aerospace Corporation, initially working on the Mercury spacecraft, X-20 Dynasoar and various ICBM projects. In 1964, the Air Force contracted them to consider a wide variety of survivable ICBM approaches, under the name "Golden Arrow".

The project considered road, rail, submarine and air-launched weapons. One of these suggested an air-launched ballistic missile. The proposal called for an enormous (for the day) turboprop-powered aircraft with two-day endurance carrying up to eight missiles that would be dropped out the back, parachuted to the vertical, and then launched. As part of the same study, Aerospace also considered a missile and wheeled launcher combination that was small enough that they could be carried in existing C-141 Starlifter aircraft. During periods of heightened tensions, they would be flown to practically any airport and set up. The Soviets would have to target thousands of airports, runways and even dirt strips and long stretches of highway to attack the fleet.

Finally, they also considered conventional missiles in "super hard" silos, buried under the southern side of mountains. As the enemy warheads would approach at a fairly shallow angle from the north, they would strike the north side of the mountains before they could hit the silos themselves. Properly positioned, this would keep the explosions at least 5,000 feet (1,500 m) away from the silos; it was believed that silos able to withstand multi-megaton explosions at one mile could be built, although this was an area of some uncertainty. This system had the advantage that the basing would be immune to changes in the accuracy or speed of the attack, only enormous increases in yield could overcome this physical barrier.

They proposed 100 missiles in three bases of 30 missiles each. They expected that at least one base would be able to survive even an all-out attack. However, if such a force of approximately 30 missiles was going to be a reasonable deterrent, each missile would need to carry 20 or more warheads. To launch them, the study introduced the "ICBM-X", a massive new 156-inch (400 cm) diameter design, well over twice the diameter of the existing LGM-30 Minuteman, and larger even than the Titan II "heavy" design at 120 inches (300 cm).

Any of the "Golden Arrow" concepts would be extremely expensive, and in the era of Robert McNamara's U.S. Department of Defense, cost was as important as any other consideration. As Alain Enthoven put it, "Our gross national product, though large, is limited. If we attempted to develop and procure a dozen or more distinct different nuclear delivery systems… we doubtless would end up squandering our resources and not doing a good job on any of them." Golden Arrow, along with many similar proposals from other firms, proceeded no further, in favor of the Minuteman II.

=== WS-120A ===
In 1966 and 67, the Department of Defense ran the STRAT-X study to consider many of these issues. As part of this program, they proposed a smaller version of ICBM-X with 10 to 20 warheads. Known initially as WS-120A and later as BGM-75 AICBM, the missile was small enough to fit in existing large silos, like those for the Titan II, but was otherwise similar in concept to the ICBM-X, with a circular error probable (CEP) of about 0.1 miles (160 m), and especially the ability to be quickly re-programmed to attack any targets needed. In comparison, the Minuteman II had a selection of eight targets, any one of which could be quickly selected for attack, but otherwise selecting a target outside this pre-computed list was not something that could be done "on the fly". WS-120A's preferred basing mode was a super-hardened shelter, but dispersed mobile options were also considered.

However, like Golden Arrow before it, WS-120A's advantages found themselves being diluted by the new Minuteman III. The Minuteman III used the new NS-20 inertial navigation system (INS) with a CEP of 0.12 nautical miles (220 m), three warheads and an expanded collection of radar countermeasures that would ensure the warheads would survive an anti-ballistic missile attack. Although the system did not include the ability to be rapidly retargeted, this capability was under development and started deployment in 1972, before the planned 1975 introduction date of WS-120A. When it was fully deployed in 1978, the entire ICBM fleet could be entirely reprogrammed in 10 hours.

=== INS advances ===
Since the late 1950s, engineers at the Charles Stark Draper Laboratory had been working on a new type of inertial platform that replaced the mechanical gimbals with a sphere floating in a thin layer of fluorocarbon fluid. The so-called "flimbal" (apparently for "floated measurement ball") would offer unprecedented accuracy and would be free from "gimbal lock", a problem that caused conventional platforms to "tumble" and lose their accuracy. Like the ICBM-X, there was little development as there appeared to be no need for a platform with the sort of accuracy the flimbal provided, and the expense of developing the system would be extremely high.

In spite of a lack of official interest, during the late 1960s Kenneth Fertig managed to arrange some funding through the Air Force for the "SABRE" INS project, short for "self-aligning boost and re-entry." The name referred to the concept that the system would be so accurate and free from the effects of mechanical shocks and jarring that it would not require any other form of "fixing" in flight. This was in contrast to the stellar-inertial systems under development by the Navy and others. It would retain its accuracy even through the rough conditions during re-entry, allowing the creation of maneuvering reentry vehicles.

=== Counterforce considerations ===
During the late 1970s, the Soviet Union fielded a large number of increasingly accurate MIRVed Heavy ICBMs like the SS-18. These missiles carried as many as 10 warheads along with up to 40 penetration aids, meaning that a small number of launches could present a threat to the Air Force's ICBM fleet while retaining a large force in reserve. If the Soviet Union launched a first strike and the U.S. did not respond immediately, the majority of their missiles and strategic bombers might be caught on the ground. A credible deterrent force would remain, but such a force might not have enough warheads left to attack both the remaining Soviet fleet and cities and other military targets.

In such a situation, the U.S. would be left with two uncomfortable options. If they chose to respond in kind and attack the remaining Soviet missile fleet, there would be little to respond with if the Soviets immediately launched against U.S. cities. The other option would require the U.S. to be the first country to launch an attack on civilian targets, an attack that was both morally reprehensible as well as against stated policy. This worrying scenario led to the effort to develop a new ICBM with the accuracy needed to be an excellent counterforce weapon, the survivability needed to absorb a Soviet first strike, and the MIRV capabilities needed to ensure even a small number of survivors would be able to attack the remaining Soviet missile fleet. The Minuteman III simply did not have this combination of features.

Whether or not this problem actually existed is open to debate. The Minuteman had a relatively fast launch time, and early warning satellites meant that commanders would have almost instant warning of a Soviet launch, with ample time to plan a response. However, it would not be until much later in the sequence of events that land-based radars would be able to track the incoming individual warheads and determine the targets. In the case of a limited counterforce attack, it would be desirable to wait until the individual targeted silos were determined, determine which Soviet missiles had not been launched, and then launch only the targeted missiles against their unlaunched Soviet counterparts. This would require extremely tight timing.

The development of practical SLBM systems upset the nuclear equation dramatically. These weapons were essentially invulnerable when at sea, and offered a credible countervalue force, primarily against civilian targets as early models like the UGM-27 Polaris and UGM-73 Poseidon did not have the accuracy to attack Soviet silos and thus offered little counterforce capability. In some ways this helped the Air Force, as it meant they could concentrate on the counterforce scenarios, knowing that a countervalue attack would always be available from the Navy. However, improvements in SLBM accuracy might allow them to handle counterforce as well, and render the entire land-based ICBM fleet superfluous. The Air Force was not interested in handing the strategic role to the Navy. A survivable ICBM would address this issue.

=== MX ===
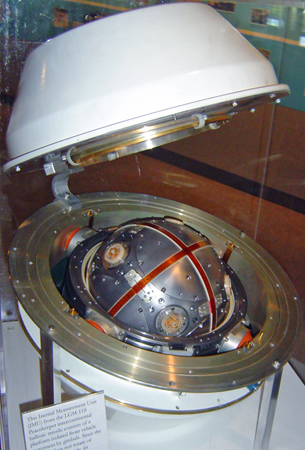
Advanced Inertial Reference Sphere

In 1971, the Air Force started a requirements development process combining the ICBM-X and SABRE concepts into a single platform, "Missile, Experimental", or MX. The new missile would have enough accuracy and warhead payload that even a few survivors would be able to destroy enormous numbers of any remaining Soviet force. The specifications for MX were fixed in February 1972, the program office at the Space and Missile Systems Organization (SAMSO) formed on 4 April, and the advanced development program started in late 1973.

To address the survivability issue, a huge series of concepts and studies followed. In 1973, Strategic Air Command rejected mobile basing due to high costs and slow reaction times due to the need to set up the launcher. On 24 October 1974 the airmobile concept was tested by SAMSO by dropping a Minuteman I from a C-5A cargo aircraft. In November, the Secretary of Defense pushed the initial operational date back from 1983 to 1985 and opened a study on the possibility of developing a single missile for both ICBM and SLBM use. A six-month study in 1977 proposed a "Low-Altitude Defense" (LoAD) system using small anti-ballistic missiles at missile fields, similar to the Sprint system, to increase survivability. This was developed into the abortive Sentry program."

For MX, the Draper Laboratory developed SABRE into the "Advanced Inertial Reference Sphere" (AIRS). AIRS would have a drift rate of only 1.5 × 10^{−5} degrees per hour, allowing it to be periodically referenced to an external point, like the silo wall, and then left for extended periods of time. Over the period of the flight the drift would be so low that any inaccuracies in the platform would account for a maximum of 1% of the warhead's final accuracy–the rest would be due to issues like the timing of the firing of the rocket engines, minor differences in warhead construction, and unavoidable randomness in the atmosphere. The Air Force also contracted with Autonetics for a backup design using mechanical gimbals, the "Advanced Stable Platform" (ASP). In May 1975 the first hand-built AIRS was transferred from Draper's laboratory to Northrop for further development.

=== Basing options ===
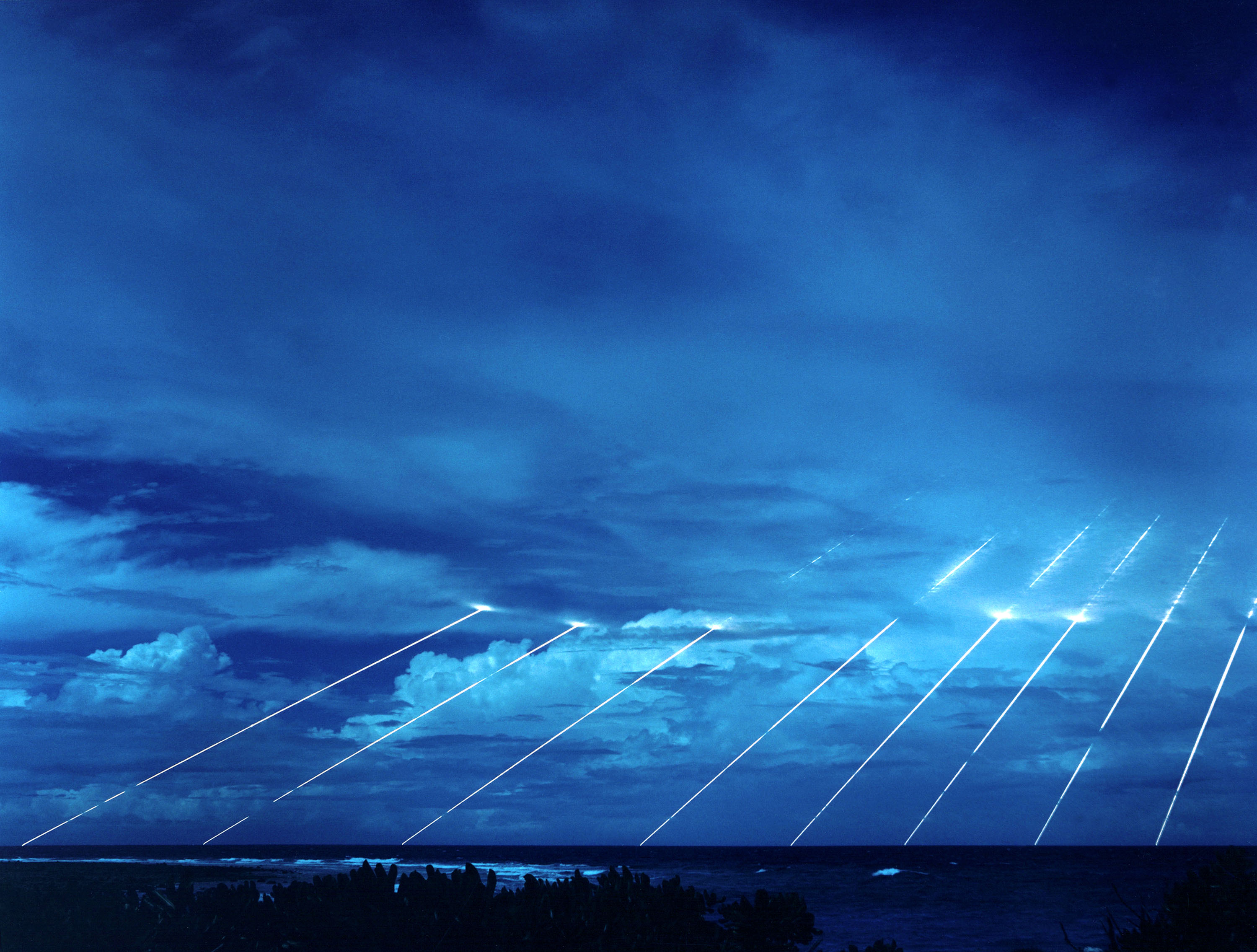
Time exposure shot of testing of the Peacekeeper re-entry vehicles at the Kwajalein Atoll, all eight fired from one missile.

In July 1976, Congress refused to fund MX using a silo-based system on grounds of vulnerability, and the project was halted. Several new proposals were made for alternate basing arrangements, including mobile basing in railway cars that would be sent out into the nation's rail network during times of heightened threat levels, and more complex systems of deeply buried silos under mesas that would include systems to quickly dig themselves out after an attack.

Eventually, the program was reinstated on 12 June 1979 by President Carter. On 7 September 1979 he announced that 200 MX missiles would be deployed throughout eastern Nevada and western Utah. The deployment would occur in a system of multiple protective shelters linked by underground or aboveground roads, the so-called "Racetrack" proposal. Local opposition in Nevada was intense, and the concept gained a powerful enemy in the form of Senator Paul Laxalt with Utah Governor Scott Matheson also opposed . Initially support was high in rural Utah, especially in the Beaver County area; although opposition increased dramatically following a statement of disapproval by the leaders of the Church of Jesus Christ of Latter-day Saints.

When Ronald Reagan took office, Laxalt's close ties with Reagan proved useful. Reagan canceled the new shelter system in 1981, calling it "a Rube Goldberg scheme". On 2 October 1981 he proposed deploying an initial force of missiles in the approximately 60 existing Titan II silos, removing those now outdated missiles from service. The silos would be modified for much greater strength, and Minuteman III silos similarly adapted over time to bring the force to a total of 100 missiles. Additionally, he suggested funding development of three additional concepts, airborne drops from cargo aircraft, an "active defense" using short-range anti-ballistic missile, or basing new silos deep underground or on the south side of mesas ("reverse-inclination basing"). The latter two quickly proved unacceptable for various reasons, while testing of the air-drop concept was pursued.

On 22 November 1982, Reagan announced that the system would be deployed in new silos in what was then known as "Closely Spaced Basing", but later better known as "dense pack". During this speech, he made the first mention of the name Peacekeeper. The dense pack idea involved building super-hardened silos that would withstand more than 10,000 psi (69 MPa) of overpressure, exceeding both the rated 2,000 psi (14 MPa) of existing silos and the proposed upgrade to 5,000 psi (34 MPa).

This extra hardness can be offset by minor increases in warhead accuracy. The key to dense pack concept was to space the silos close together, about 1,800 feet (550 m) apart. This was a large enough distance between silos to ensure that a single warhead could not destroy more than one silo; no conceivable warhead was powerful enough to destroy the silos from the point between them, 900 feet (270 m) from either silo. To attack the dense pack, separate warheads would have to be aimed at each silo. When one of the attacking warheads exploded, the blast wave and dirt thrown into the air would destroy any nearby warheads.

This "fratricide theory" was highly criticized due to the expected relative ease with which the Soviets could modify their warheads and circumvent this design. All that was required was that several warheads arrive and be detonated within a few milliseconds of each other, so the blast waves did not reach each other before completing destruction of the silo. Such timing could be easily achieved by launching all of the warheads from a single missile. Congress again rejected the system.

=== Scowcroft Commission ===
Reagan responded to this setback by appointing Lieutenant General Brent Scowcroft to lead a Commission on Strategic Forces, better known as the Scowcroft Commission.

In overall terms, the most important conclusion of the Scowcroft Commission was that the "window of vulnerability" in regard to the Soviet capability to attack U.S. ICBMs never existed in the first place. The report examined a wide array of potential attack scenarios, and demonstrated that none allowed the Soviets to significantly blunt a U.S. response, nor seriously limit its options in the flexible response policy.

Delivered 6 April 1983, the report suggested deploying 100 MX in existing Minuteman silos as a "demonstration of national will", but in other ways basically suggested eliminating both MX and Minuteman and replacing them with a small single-warhead mobile ICBM. On 10 August 1983, the Secretary of Defense ordered 100 Peacekeepers be deployed at Warren AFB in Wyoming and began development of what became the MGM-134 Midgetman.

=== SLBMs come of age ===
By this time both the U.S. and USSR were beginning to field third-generation SLBMs with greatly improved accuracy. These now arguably had all of the capability of the land-based ICBMs, and were equally able to carry out the counterforce mission. Additionally, the submarines could maneuver much closer to their targets, greatly reducing the warning time, potentially to the point that the command structure would not have time to launch their ICBMs and bombers before the warheads were reaching them.

The development of the Trident II, which was described as "effective against most of the hardened military targets, including missile silos and launch control centers", reopened the debate about MX. If Trident was capable of carrying out the mission originally intended for MX, and do so from a completely protected and mobile platform, what capabilities did MX add?

A compromise was eventually developed in mid-1983. Under this scheme, 100 missiles would be deployed in existing Minuteman silos to "show national will". The plan also called for the removal of the old and accident-prone liquid fueled Titan II from use. However, this did not address the problem the MX was originally intended to solve, providing high survivability. This would later be addressed through the re-introduction of the "rail garrison" concept, with twenty-five trains each carrying two missiles. This system was expected to be operational in 1992. The supposed counterforce gap, then being widely talked about on television, also resulted in the schedule for silo deployment being moved up, dropping the production time from 44 months to 29.

Additionally, the plan also called for the development of an entirely new missile, which would emerge as the MGM-134 Midgetman. The Midgetman deliberately carried only one warhead and was highly mobile. Countering a single Midgetman would require the Soviets to blanket an area around its last known position with warheads. Even if this was successful, they would destroy only a single warhead. Faced with this choice, it was expected the Soviets would instead expend their warheads on easier targets.

==== Peacekeeper Rail Garrison ====
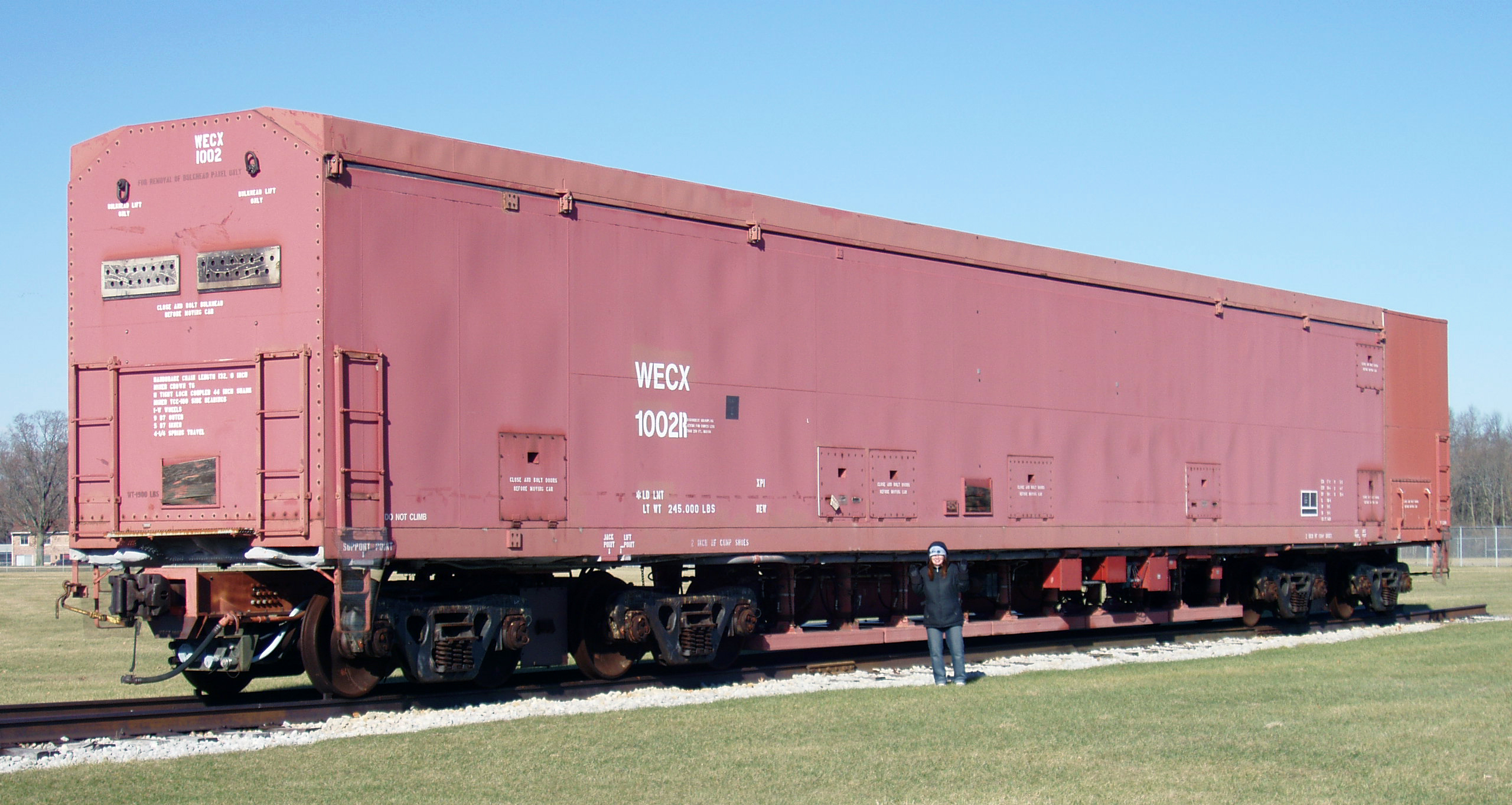
Retired Peacekeeper Rail Garrison Car prototype at the National Museum of the United States Air Force.

The Peacekeeper Rail Garrison was a mobile missile system developed by the Air Force in the 1980s. If war with the Soviet Union loomed, fifty MGM-118A Peacekeeper intercontinental ballistic missiles could be deployed on the U.S. rail network to avoid being destroyed by a first strike counterforce attack. The plan was cancelled amid defense cuts after the Cold War, and the Peacekeeper missiles were installed in silo launchers as LGM-118s instead.

=== Deployment ===
The new ICBM was originally planned to be called "Peacemaker", but at the last minute was officially designated the LGM-118A Peacekeeper. Flight Test Missile 01 (FTM-01) was launched on 17 June 1983, by the Air Force Systems Command Ballistic Missile Office (Norton AFB, CA), 6595th Missile Test Group (Vandenberg AFB, CA; Air Force Systems Command), and Martin Marietta, from Vandenberg AFB, California Test Pad-01, traveling 4,200 nautical miles (4,800 mi; 7,800 km) to strike successfully in the Kwajalein Test Range in the Pacific. The first eight test flights were launched from an above ground canister on TP-01, with the remaining test and operational Strategic Air Command flights from modified Minuteman III silos (LF-02, −05, & -08) all located on North Vandenberg AFB. A total of 50 flight tests were accomplished.

The operational missile was first manufactured in February 1984 and was deployed in December 1986 to the Strategic Air Command, 90th Strategic Missile Wing at Francis E. Warren Air Force Base in Cheyenne, Wyoming in re-fitted Minuteman silos. However, the AIRS was not yet ready and the missiles were deployed with non-operational guidance units. AIRS had 19,000 parts and some of these required as many as 11,000 testing steps. Bogged down in paperwork due to government procurement policies, managers started bypassing official channels and buying replacement parts wherever they could be found, including claims that some of the parts were sourced at Radio Shack. In other cases, managers had created false shell companies to order needed test equipment.

When these allegations were released by 60 Minutes and the Los Angeles Times, the fallout was immediate. Northrop was slapped with a $130 million fine for late delivery, and when they reacted against employees they were countersued in whistleblower suits. The Air Force also admitted that 11 of the 29 missiles deployed were not operational. A Congressional report stated that "Northrop was behind schedule before it even started" and noted that the Air Force knew as early as 1985 that there were "serious system deficiencies as well as a lack of effective progress". They complained that the Air Force should have come clean and simply pushed back the deployment date, but instead, in order to foster the illusion of progress, the missiles were deployed in a non-operational state.

The first prototype AIRS, by then known more generically as the Inertial Measurement Unit, or IMU, was delivered in May 1986, 203 days late. It was not until July 1987 that the first production AIRS were ready to ship, and the complete supply for the first 50 missiles was not complete until December 1988. Given these delays, and increased performance of the UGM-133 Trident II, Congress had already cancelled the 100-missile option in July 1985. In that decision, Congress limited the deployment of Peacekeeper ICBMs to 50 missiles until a more "survivable" basing plan could be developed.

Development of the rail garrison system was carried out in parallel. However, budgetary constraints and the dissolution of the Soviet Union led to its being scrapped. The National Museum of the United States Air Force has a rail garrison box car on display, and developmental remnants of the program can still be found at Vandenberg Air Force Base.

The project had already cost around $20 billion up to 1998 and produced 114 missiles, at $400 million for each operational missile. The "flyaway" cost of each warhead was estimated at 20 to 70 million dollars.

== Retirement and deactivation ==
The missiles were gradually retired, with 17 withdrawn during 2003, leaving 29 missiles on alert at the beginning of 2004, and only 10 by the beginning of 2005. The last Peacekeeper was removed from alert on 19 September 2005 during the final deactivation ceremony when the 400th Missile Squadron was inactivated as well. During the ceremony an Under Secretary of the Air Force credited the Peacekeeper with helping to end the Cold War.

The Peacekeeper rockets were converted to the satellite launcher role by Orbital Sciences, as the Minotaur IV (OSP-2), while the warheads were redeployed on the existing Minuteman III missiles.

== Operator ==
- The United States Air Force was the only operator of the Peacekeeper.

400th Strategic Missile Squadron (later 400th Missile Squadron), Francis E. Warren AFB, Wyoming (1987–2005). Airborne Missileers operating the Common Airborne Launch Control System onboard Airborne Launch Control Center aircraft provided a survivable capability to remotely control and launch the Peacekeeper ICBM in the event the underground Launch Control Centers were unable to do so.

- Orbital Sciences: Will use the Minotaur IV civilian launch platform version.

== See also ==
- List of ICBMs
- Peace through strength
