= MGM-134 Midgetman =

MGM-134A Midgetman
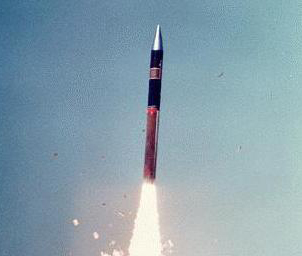
- Test launch of Midgetman
- Type: Intercontinental ballistic missile
- Place of origin: United States

Service history
- In service: prototype only (1991)
- Used by: United States

Production history
- Designer: Martin Marietta

Specifications
- Mass: 13,600 kg (30,000 lb)
- Length: 14 m (46 ft)
- Diameter: 1.17 m (3 ft 10 in)
- Blast yield: W87-1: 475 kt (1,990 TJ); W61: 340 kt (1,400 TJ)
- Engine: Solid-fuel rocket
- Propellant: solid propellant
- Operational range: 7,000 miles (11,300 km)
- Guidance system: Inertial, GPS
- Accuracy: 90 m (300 ft) CEP
- Launch platform: Hard Mobile Launcher (HML)
- Transport: Hard Mobile Launcher (HML)

The MGM-134A Midgetman, also known as the Small Intercontinental Ballistic Missile, was an intercontinental ballistic missile developed by the United States Air Force. The system was mobile and could be set up rapidly, allowing it to move to a new firing location after learning of an enemy missile launch. To attack the weapon, the enemy would have to blanket the area around its last known location with multiple warheads, using up a large percentage of their force for limited gains and no guarantee that all of the missiles would be destroyed. In such a scenario, the U.S. would retain enough of their forces for an effective counterstrike, thereby maintaining deterrence.

== Overview ==
The Midgetman grew out of a requirement expressed in the mid-1980s by the U.S. Air Force for a small ICBM which could be deployed on road vehicles. Fixed silos are inherently vulnerable to attack, and with the increasing accuracy of submarine-launched ballistic missiles there was a growing threat that the Soviet Union could launch large numbers of missiles from off the coast, destroying most of the U.S. ICBM force before it could be used (first strike). By producing a mobile missile which could not easily be targeted by enemy forces, and thus survive a first strike attempt, the Air Force hoped to reduce this possibility and maintain the ability to deter (second strike). It was also a response to the Soviet development of SS-24 (rail mobile) and the SS-25 (road mobile) ICBMs.

System definition studies for the Small Intercontinental Ballistic Missile commenced in 1984 under an Air Force Program Office located at Norton AFB, CA, with TRW providing system engineering and technical assistance support. Contracts were awarded by the end of 1986 to Martin Marietta, Thiokol, Hercules, Aerojet, Boeing, General Electric, Rockwell and Logicon and authorization to proceed with full scale development of the MGM-134A Midgetman was granted. The first prototype missile was launched in 1989, but tumbled off course and was destroyed over the Pacific Ocean after about 70 seconds. The first successful test flight took place on April 18, 1991.

== Design ==
In design the XMGM-134A was a three-stage solid-fuelled missile. Like the LGM-118 Peacekeeper it used the cold launch system, in which gas pressure was used to eject the missile from the launch canister. The rocket would only ignite once the missile was free of the launcher.

The Midgetman had a range of some 11,000 kilometers (6,800 mi). Two warheads were developed for the missile: the W87-1 warhead in a Mark 21 re-entry vehicle with a yield of 475 kt (1,990 TJ), and the W61 earth penetrating warhead with a yield of 340 kt (1,400 TJ).

=== Carrier vehicle: Hard Mobile Launcher ===
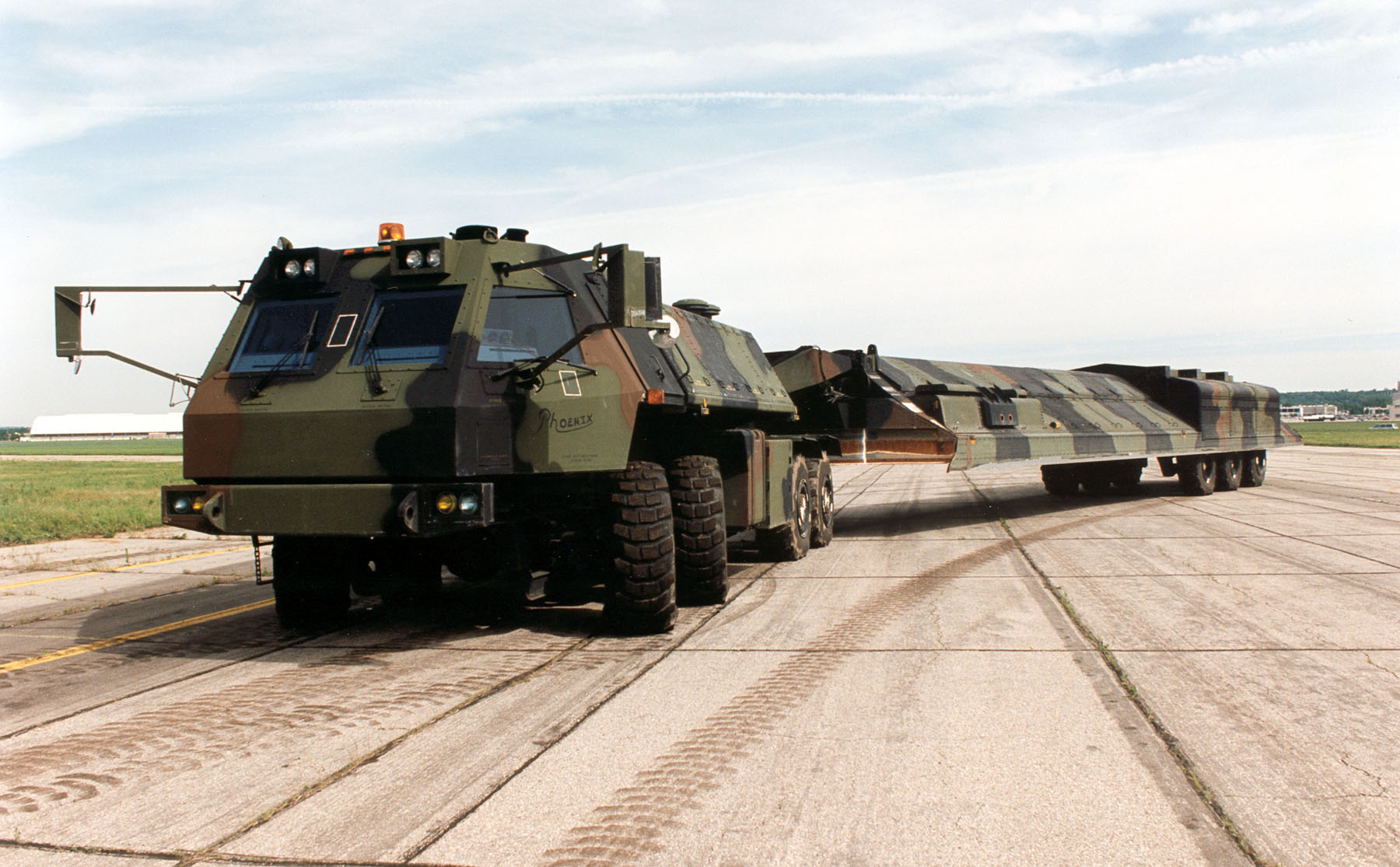
Hard Mobile Launcher

The Midgetman was to be carried by an eight-wheel drive Hard Mobile Launcher (HML) vehicle. Most of these vehicles would normally remain on bases, only being deployed in times of international crisis when nuclear war was considered more likely. The Hard Mobile Launcher was radiation hardened and had a trailer mounted plow to dig the HML into the earth for additional nuclear blast protection.

=== Cancellation ===
With the end of the Cold War in the 1990s the U.S. scaled back its development of new nuclear weapons. The Midgetman program was therefore cancelled in January 1992. The legacy of its lighter graphite-wound solid rocket motor technology lived on in the GEM side boosters used on the Delta rockets, and the Orion stages of the Pegasus air-launched rocket.

The Soviet equivalent of this missile was the RSS-40 Kuryer which was tested but cancelled in October 1991. This could have filled the role of the more cost effective Topol M road mobile ICBM.

== See also ==
- Nuclear warfare
- Nuclear weapon
- Intercontinental ballistic missile
- List of missiles
