= Hard Mobile Launcher =

US road-mobile ICBM launch vehicle

Small ICBM Hard Mobile Launcher
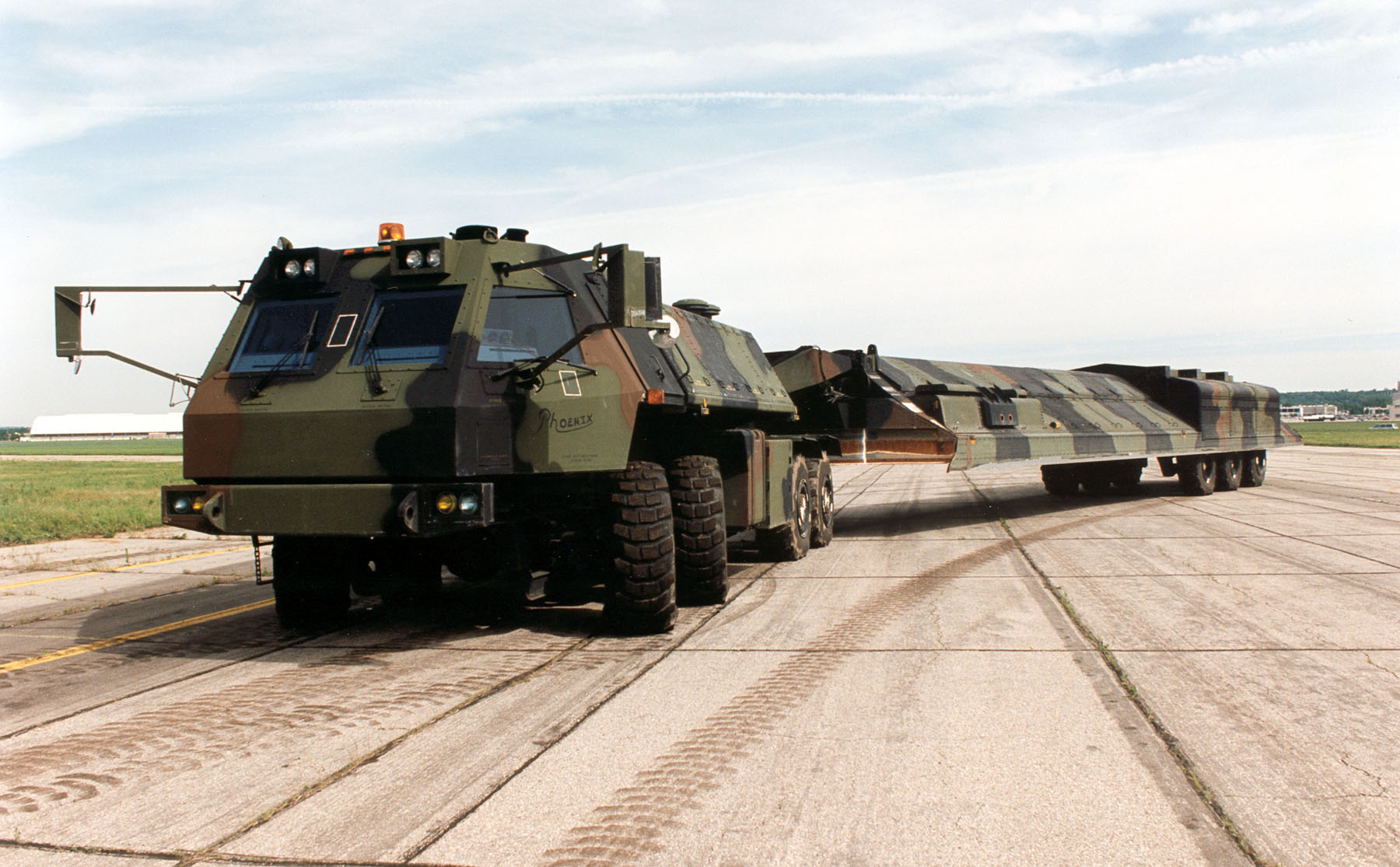
- A Hard Mobile Launcher engineering model
- Type: Mobile ICBM Launcher
- Place of origin: United States

Service history
- In service: Prototype only (1986–1991)
- Used by: United States

Specifications
- Mass: 239,000 lb (108,400 kg)
- Length: 110 ft (33.5 m)
- Engine: Rolls-Royce Perkins diesel 1,200 hp (890 kW)
- Maximum speed: 55 mph (89 km/h) on road

The Hard Mobile Launcher (HML) is a mobile radiation-hardened truck transporter erector launcher designed to facilitate the transport and launching of the MGM-134 Midgetman missile.

== Overview ==
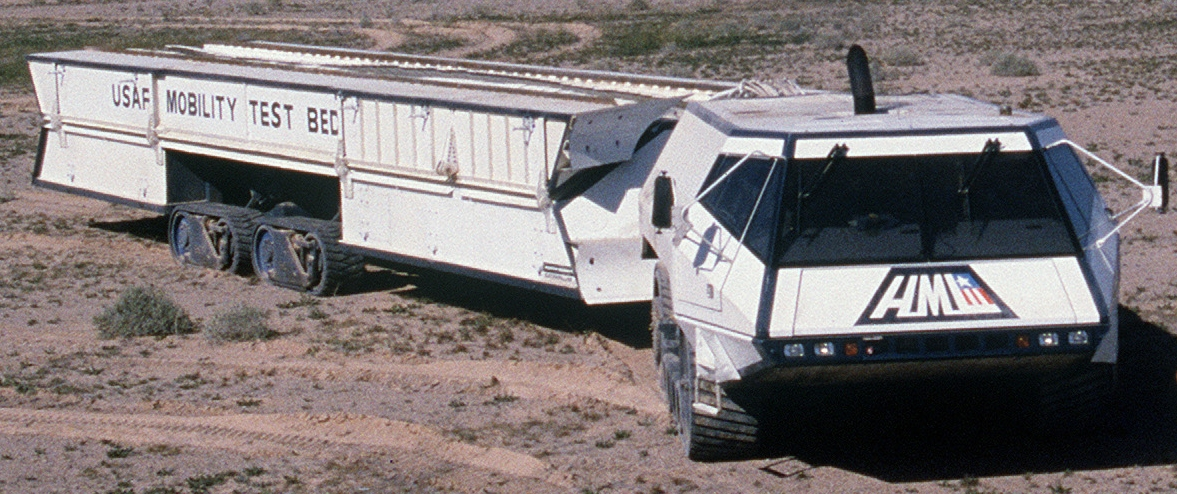
Martin Marietta-Caterpillar prototype

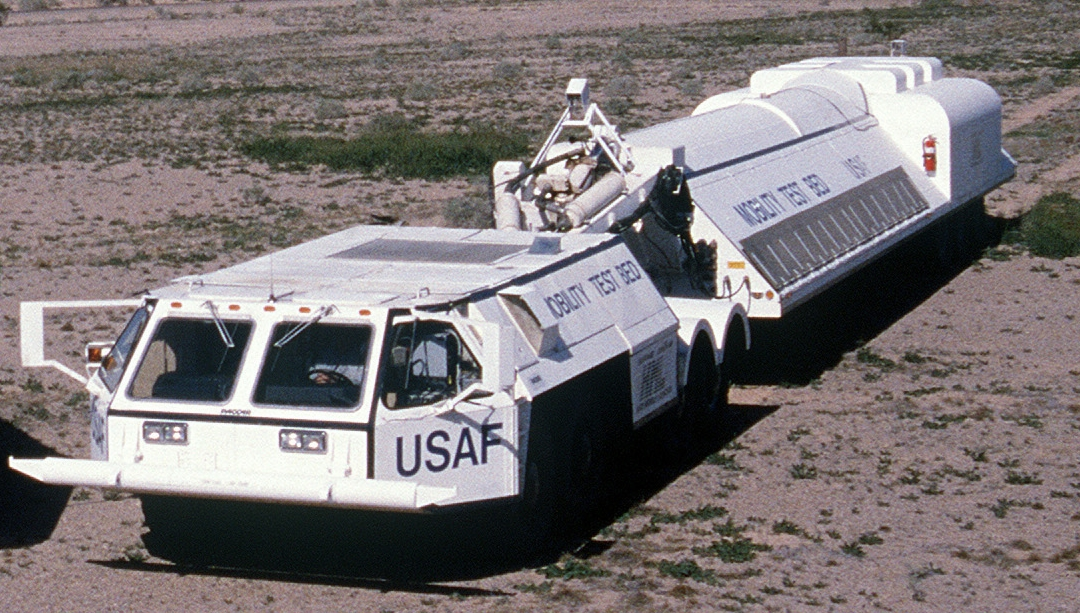
Boeing-Goodyear HML launcher during test phase

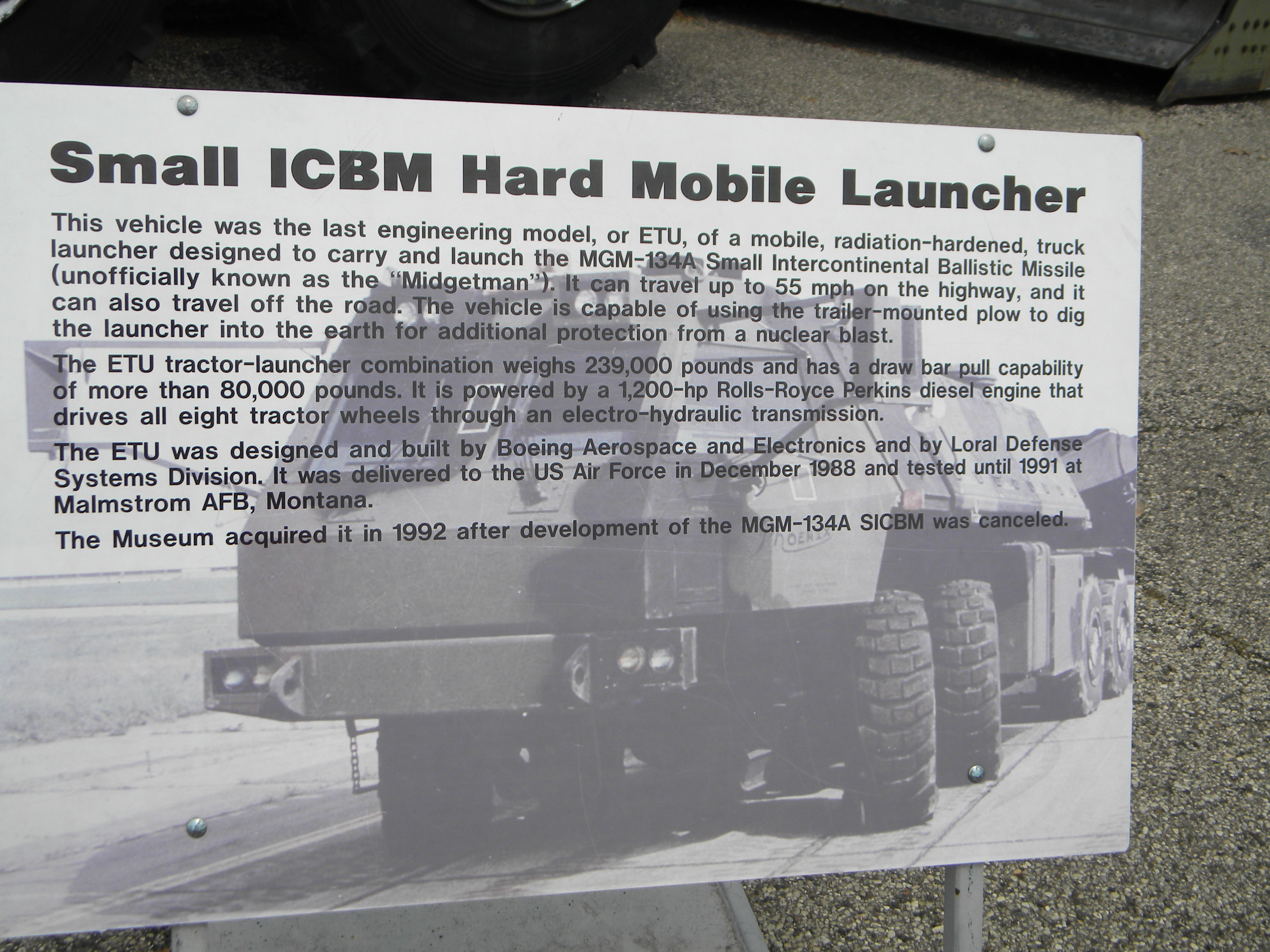
U.S. Air Force National Museum plaque

It can travel at speeds of up to 55 mph (89 km/h) on the road and it also has off-road capabilities. The vehicle also has a trailer mounted plow which can be used to dig the launcher into the earth in order to help protect it were it within the vicinity of a nuclear detonation.

The vehicle weighs a total of 239,000 lb (108,000 kg), with a length of over 110 feet (34 m) and it has the capability to transport objects weighing up to 80,000 lb (36,000 kg). It is powered by a Rolls-Royce Perkins diesel engine which produces 1,200 hp (890 kW) and controls all 8 wheels using an electro-hydraulic transmission.

== Design and testing ==
Two teams were assigned to develop a vehicle.

Caterpillar developed a tracked tractor (Mobil-Trac System) while Martin Marietta was the system integrator and also built the Mobility Test Bed missile trailer.

A second team consisting of Boeing Aerospace and Electronics' Loral Defense Systems Division (Goodyear Aerospace) built an eight wheel drive vehicle and trailer.

The Air Force selected the Boeing-Loral prototype. Several vehicles were delivered to the US Air Force by December 1986. The Air Force tested the vehicle until 1991, after which development of the MGM-134 missile project ceased, leading to the project's cancellation.

== NMUSAF Museum acquisition ==
Following the cancellation of the MGM-134 missile project, the last of the engineering models was acquired by the National Museum of the U.S. Air Force in Ohio in 1992. It is no longer on display and was given to the Defense Reutilization and Marketing Office.

The Hard Mobile Launcher at Wright Patterson Air Force Base was auctioned and sold for scrap in July 2015. It was broken up in September 2015.

== Hill Aerospace Museum ==
The Boeing-Loral prototype is currently stored at Hill Aerospace Museum in Utah
